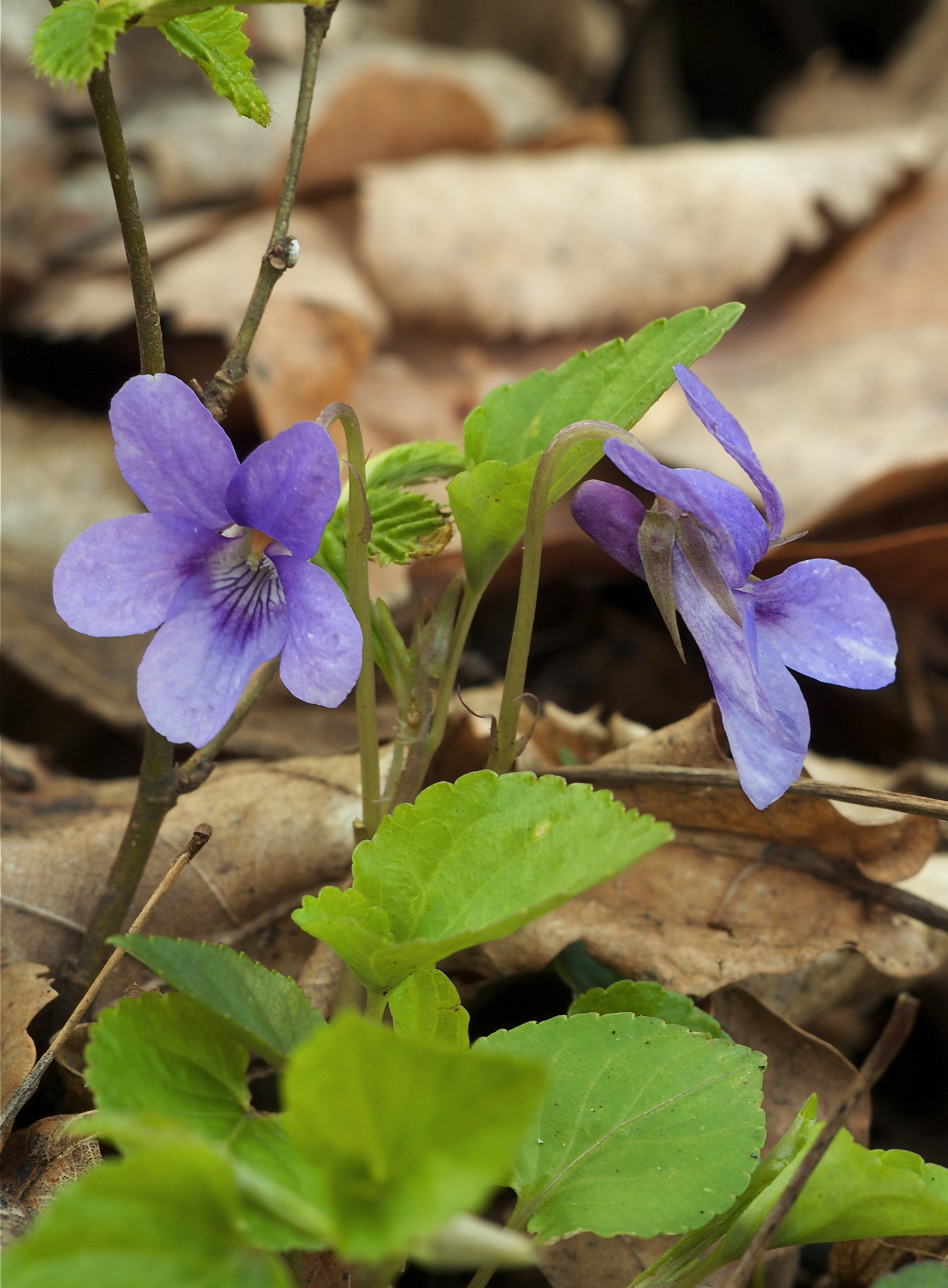
- Viola reichenbachiana

Scientific classification
- Kingdom: Plantae
- Clade: Tracheophytes
- Clade: Angiosperms
- Clade: Eudicots
- Clade: Rosids
- Order: Malpighiales
- Family: Violaceae
- Subfamily: Violoideae
- Tribe: Violeae
- Genus: Viola; L.

Type species
- Viola odorata L.

Sections
- see Subdivision

Synonyms
- List: Chrysion Spach; Cittaronium Rchb.; Crocion Nieuwl.; Dischidium Rchb.; Erpetion DC. ex Sweet; Grammeionium Rchb.; Ion Medik.; Jacea Opiz; Lophion Spach; Mnemion Spach; Oionychion Nieuwl.

= Viola (plant) =

Genus of flowering plants

Viola, commonly known as the violets, is a genus of flowering plants in the family Violaceae. It is the largest genus in the family, containing over 680 species. Most species are found in the temperate Northern Hemisphere; however, some are also found in widely divergent areas such as Hawaii, Australasia, and the Andes.

Some Viola species are perennial plants, some are annual plants, and a few are small shrubs. Many species, varieties and cultivars are grown in gardens for their ornamental flowers. In horticulture, the term pansy is normally used for those multi-colored large-flowered cultivars which are raised annually or biennially from seed and used extensively in bedding.

== Description ==
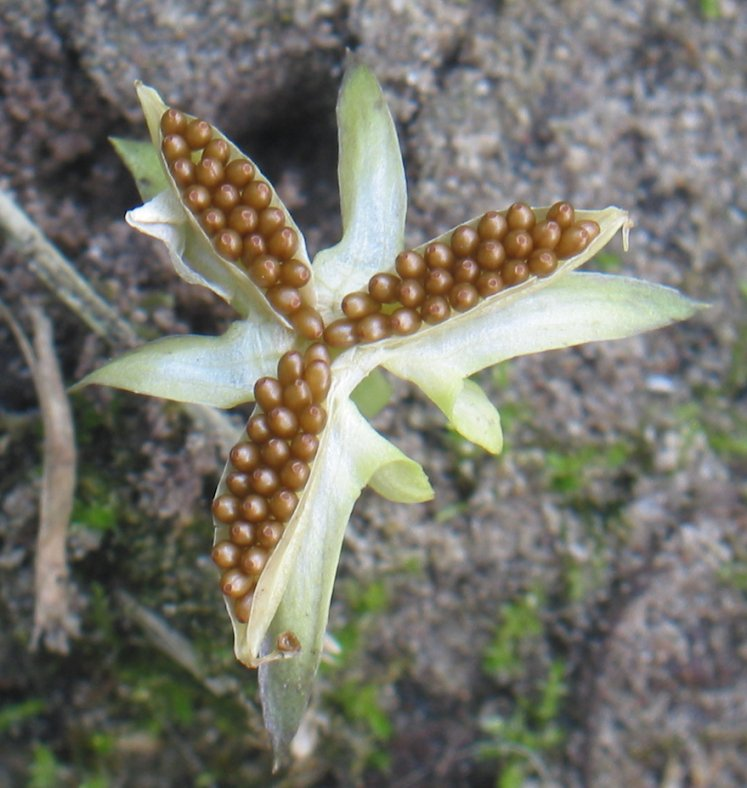
Opened seed capsule of Viola arvensis (field pansy, Melanium), showing the seeds

Viola species can be annual or perennial, and can take the form of herbs, shrubs or very rarely treelets. In acaulescent taxa the foliage and flowers appear to rise from the ground. The remainder have short stems with foliage and flowers produced in the axils of the leaves (axillary).

They typically have heart-shaped or reniform (kidney-shaped) scalloped leaves, though a number have linear or palmate leaves. The simple leaves of plants with either habit are arranged alternately; the acaulescent species produce basal rosettes. Plants always have leaves with stipules that are often leaf-like.

The flowers of the vast majority of the species are strongly zygomorphic with bilateral symmetry and solitary, but occasionally form cymes. The flowers are formed from five petals; four are upswept or fan-shaped with two per side, and there is one, broad, lobed lower petal pointing downward. This petal may be slightly or much shorter than the others and is weakly differentiated. The shape of the petals and placement defines many species, for example, some species have a "spur" on the end of each petal while most have a spur on the lower petal. The spur may vary from scarcely exserted (projecting) to very long, such as in Viola rostrata.

Solitary flowers end long stalks with a pair of bracteoles. The flowers have five sepals that persist after blooming, and in some species the sepals enlarge after blooming. The corolla ranges from white to yellow, orange or various shades of blue and violet or multicolored, often blue and yellow, with or without a yellow throat.

The flowers have five free stamens with short free filaments that are oppressed against the ovary, with a dorsal connective appendage that is large, entire and oblong to ovate. Only the lower two stamens are calcarate (possessing nectary spurs that are inserted on the lowest petal into the spur or a pouch). The styles are filiform (threadlike) or clavate (clubshaped), thickened at their tip, being globose to rostellate (beaked). The stigmas are head-like, narrowed or often beaked. The flowers have a superior ovary with one cell, which has three placentae, containing many ovules.

After flowering, fruit capsules are produced that are thick walled, with few to many seeds per carpel, and dehisce (split open) by way of three valves. On drying, the capsules may eject seeds with considerable force to distances of several meters. The nutlike seeds, which are obovoid to globose, are typically arillate (with a specialized outgrowth) and have straight embryos, flat cotyledons, and soft fleshy endosperm that is oily.

=== Phytochemistry ===
One characteristic of some Viola is the elusive scent of their flowers; along with terpenes, a major component of the scent is a ketone compound called ionone, which temporarily desensitizes the receptors of the nose, thus preventing any further scent being detected from the flower until the nerves recover.

== Taxonomy ==
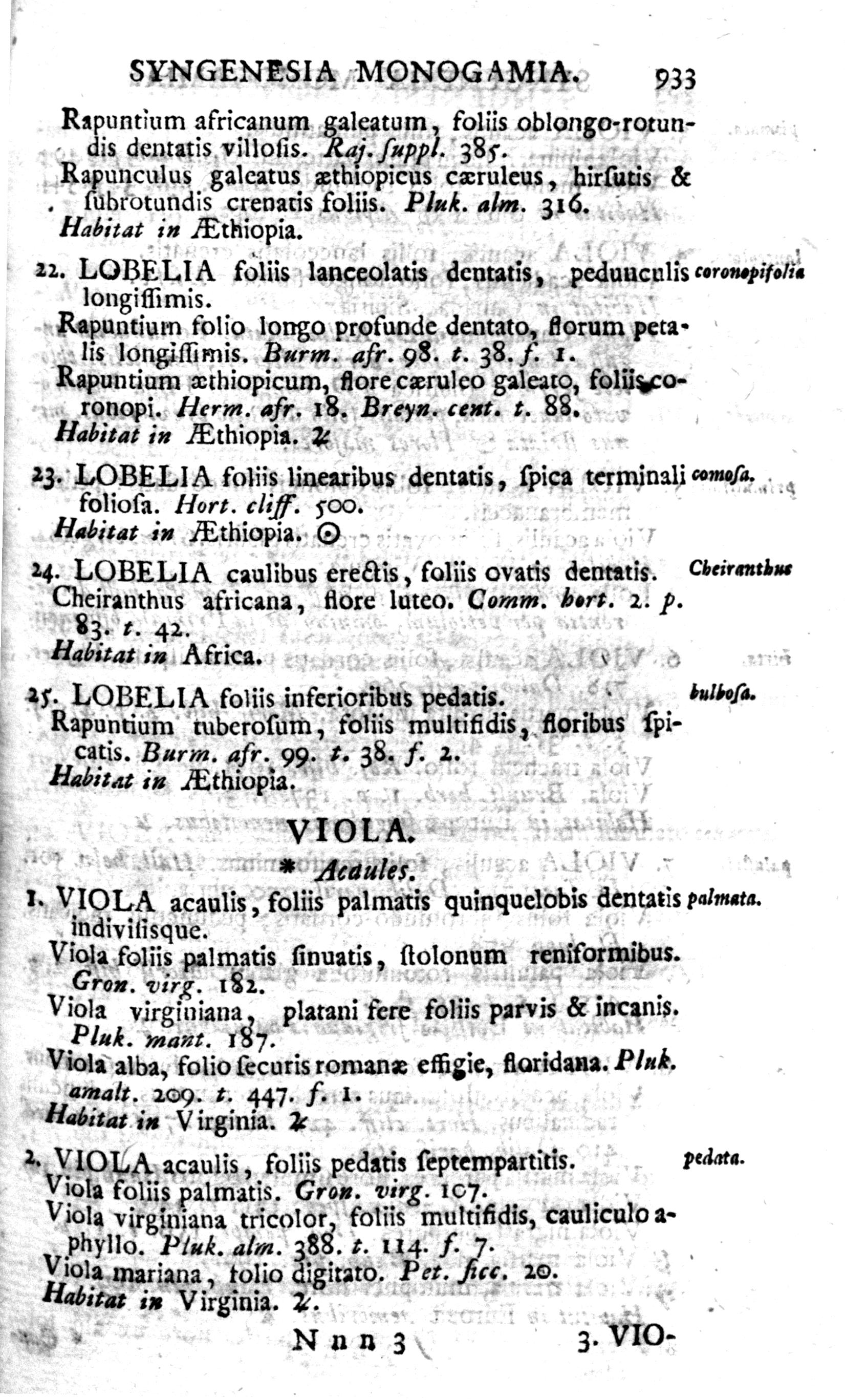
Linnaeus' original description (1753)

=== History ===
First formally described by Carl Linnaeus in 1753 with 19 species, the genus Viola bears his botanical authority, L. When Jussieu established the hierarchical system of families (1789), he placed Viola in the Cisti (rock roses), though by 1811 he suggested Viola be separated from these. However, in 1802 Batsch had already established a separate family, which he called Violariae based on Viola as the type genus, with seven other genera. Although Violariae continued to be used by some authors, such as Bentham and Hooker in 1862 (as Violarieae), most authors adopted the alternative name Violaceae, first proposed by de Lamarck and de Candolle in 1805, and Gingins (1823) and Saint-Hilaire (1824). However de Candolle also used Violarieae in his 1824 Prodromus.

=== Phylogeny ===
Viola is one of about 25 genera and about 600 species in the large eudicot family Violaceae, divided into subfamilies and tribes. While most genera are monotypic, Viola is a very large genus, variously circumscribed as having between 500 and 600 species. Historically it was placed in subfamily Violoideae, tribe Violeae. But these divisions have been shown to be artificial and not monophyletic. Molecular phylogenetic studies show that Viola occurs in Clade I of the family, as Viola, Schweiggeria, Noisettia and Allexis, in which Schweiggeria and Noisettia are monotypic and form a sister group to Viola.

=== Subdivision ===
Viola is a large genus that has traditionally been treated in sections. One of these was that of Gingins (1823), based on stigma morphology, with five sections (Nomimium, Dischidium, Chamaemelanium, Melanium, Leptidium). The extensive taxonomic studies of Wilhelm Becker, culminating in his 1925 conspectus, resulted in 14 sections and many infrasectional groups. The largest and most diverse, being section Viola, with 17 subsections. In addition to subsections, series were also described. Alternatively, some authors have preferred to subdivide the genus into subgenera. Subsequent treatments were by Gershoy (1934) and Clausen (1964), using subsections and series. These were all based on morphological characteristics. Subsequent studies using molecular phylogenetic methods, such as that of Ballard et al. (1998) have shown that many of these traditional divisions are not monophyletic, the problem being related to a high degree of hybridization. In particular section Nomimium was dismembered into several new sections and transferring part of it to section Viola. Section Viola s. lat. is represented by four sections, Viola sensu stricto, Plagiostigma s. str., Nosphinium sensu lato. and the V. spathulata group. In that analysis, the S American sections appear to be the basal groups, starting with Rubellium, then Leptidium. However, the exact phylogenetic relationships remain unresolved, as a consequence many different taxonomic nomenclatures are in use, including groupings referred to as Grex. Marcussen et al. place the five S American sections, Andinium, Leptidium, Tridens, Rubellium and Chilenium at the base of the phylogenetic tree, in that order. These are followed by the single Australian section, Erpetion, as sister group to Chilenium, the northern hemisphere sections and finally the single African section, V. abyssinica. These sections are morphologically, chromosomally, and geographically distinct.

==== Sections ====
Seventeen sections are recognized, listed alphabetically (approximate no. species);

- Sect. Andinium W.Becker (113) S America
- Sect. Chamaemelanium Ging. s.lat. (61) N America, northeast Asia (includes Dischidium, Orbiculares)
  - Subsect. Chamaemelanium
  - Subsect. Nudicaules
  - Subsect. Nuttalianae
- Sect. Chilenium W.Becker (8) southern S America
- Sect. Danxiaviola W. B. Liao et Q. Fan (1) China
- Sect. Delphiniopsis W.Becker (3) western Eurasia: southern Spain; Balkans
- Sect. Erpetion (Banks) W.Becker (11–18) eastern Australia; Tasmania
- Sect. Leptidium Ging. (19) S America
- Sect. Melanium Ging. (125) western Eurasia (pansies)
- Sect. Nosphinium W.Becker s.lat. (31–50) N, C and northern S America; Beringia; Hawaii
- Sect. nov. A (V. abyssinica group) (1–3) Africa: equatorial high mountains
- Sect. nov. B (V. spathulata group) (7–9) western and central Asia: northern Iraq to Mongolia
- Sect. Plagiostigma Godr. (120) northern hemisphere (includes Diffusae)
  - Grex Primulifolia
- Sect. Rubellium W.Becker (3–6) S America: Chile
- Sect. Sclerosium W.Becker (1–4) northeastern Africa to southwestern Asia
- Sect. Tridens W.Becker (2) southern S America
- Sect. Viola s.str. (Rostellatae nom. illeg.) (75) northern hemisphere (violets) (includes Repentes)
  - Subsect. Rostratae Kupffer (W.Becker)
  - Subsect. Viola
- Sect. Xylinosium W.Becker (3–4) Mediterranean region

==== Species ====
The genus includes dog violets, a group of scentless species which are the most common Viola in many areas, sweet violet (Viola odorata) (named from its sweet scent), and many other species whose common name includes the word "violet". But not other "violets": Neither Streptocarpus sect. Saintpaulia ("African violets", Gesneriaceae) nor Erythronium dens-canis ("dogtooth violets", Liliaceae) are related to Viola.

===== List of selected species =====
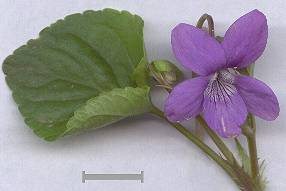
Viola canina

====== Section Andinium ======
With about 113 species, the South American section Andinium is the largest of the Viola sections. It is one of the four sections distributed primarily or exclusively in South America, and the basal group of Viola. New species continue to be identified. Species include;

- Viola escarapela
- Viola lilliputana

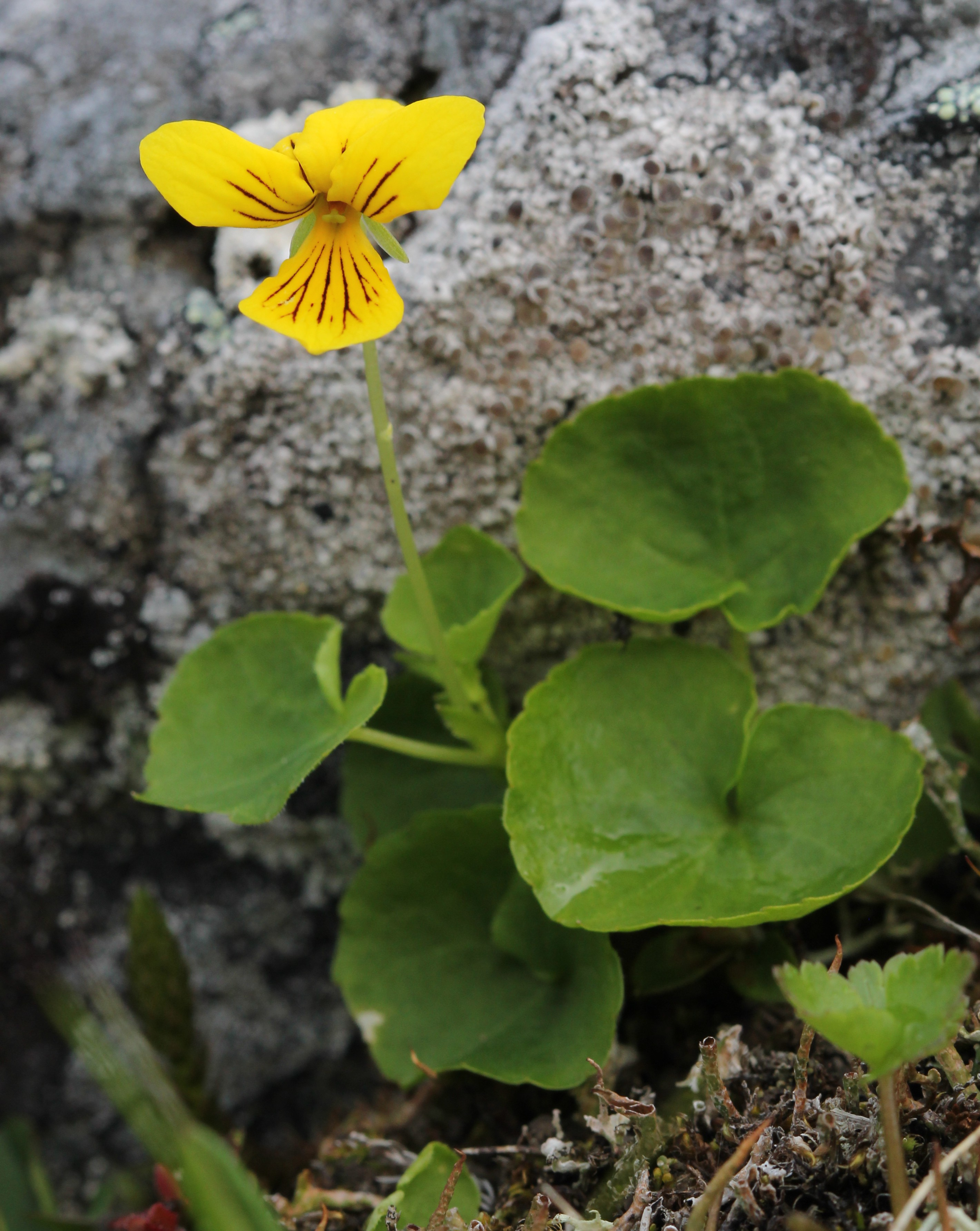
Viola biflora

====== Section Chamaemelanium ======
Chamaemelanium was one of a number of sections originally classified on the basis of the shape of the stigma, in this case one that was facial shaped, had an absent beak and had lateral beards. But this section has subsequently been shown to be paraphyletic, requiring revision. It occurs at high altitudes (above 600 m) in both N America and northeast Asia, including Siberia and Korea, and the species are perennial, caulous and herbaceous. With about 61 species including;

- Viola biflora – yellow wood violet, twoflower violet
- Viola glabella – stream violet
- Viola pedunculata – yellow pansy
- Viola praemorsa – canary violet
- Viola pubescens – downy yellow violet

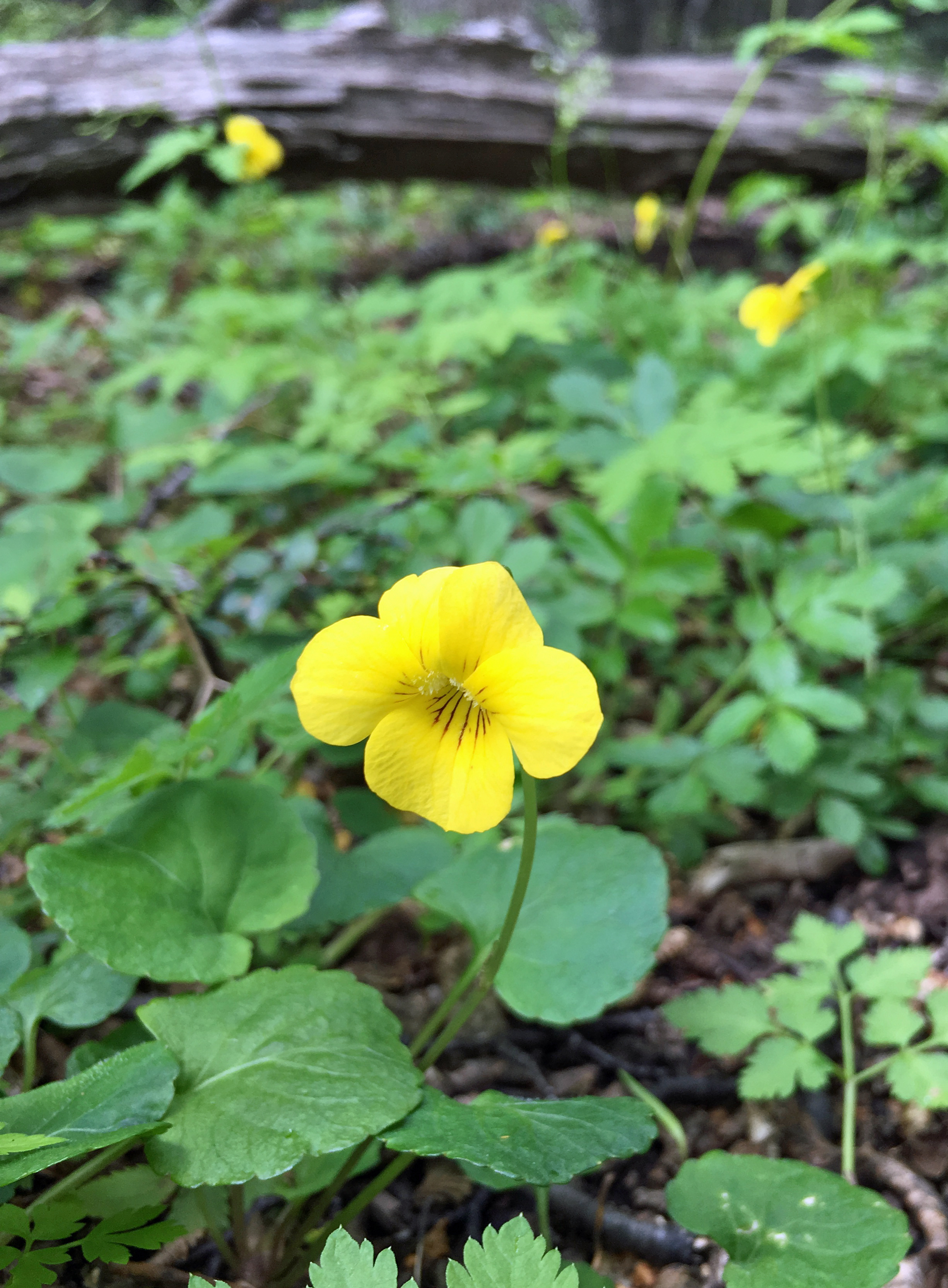
Viola reichei

====== Section Chilenium ======
A small S American section with about 8 species, as sister group to Erpetion, including;

- Viola reichei

Section Danxiaviola

- Viola hybanthoides

Section Delphiniopsis

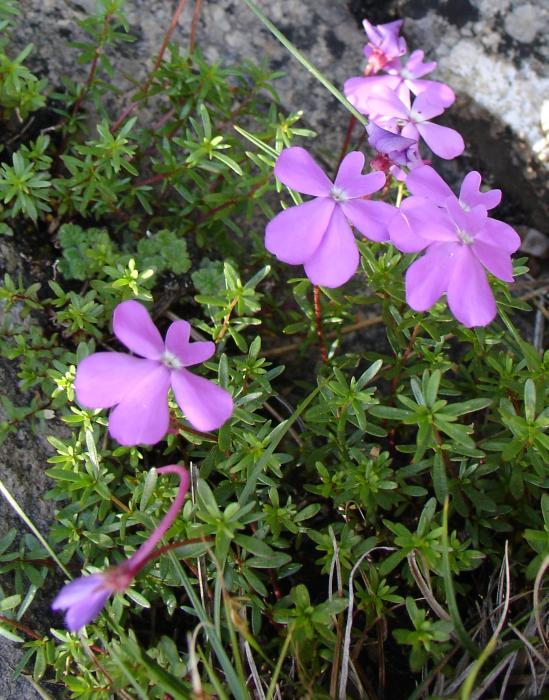
Viola cazorlensis

- Viola cazorlensis
- Viola delphinantha
- Viola kosaninii

Section Erpetion

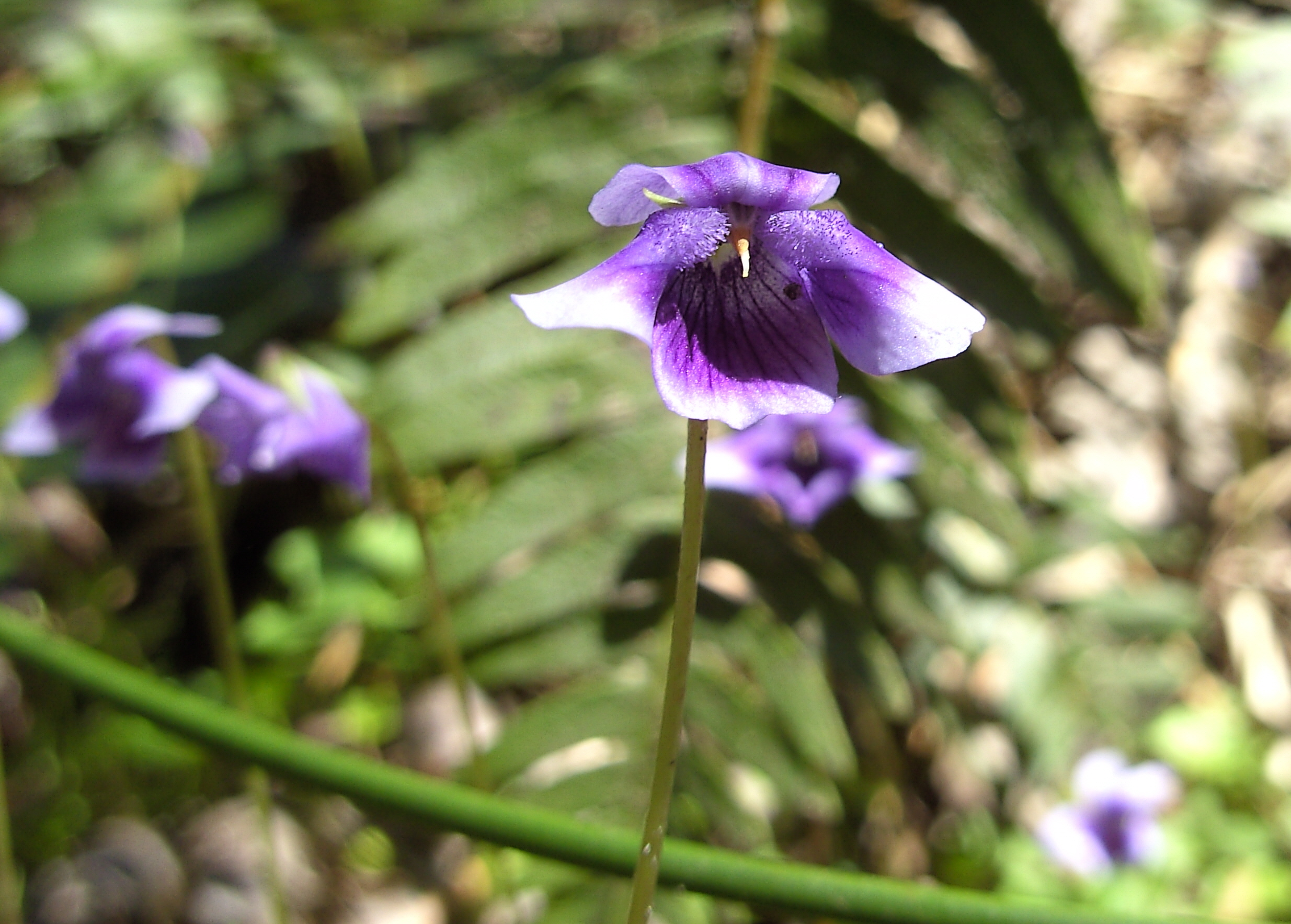
Viola banksii

- Viola banksii – Australian native violet, ivy-leaved violet
- Viola hederacea – Australian native violet, ivy-leaved violet

Section Leptidium

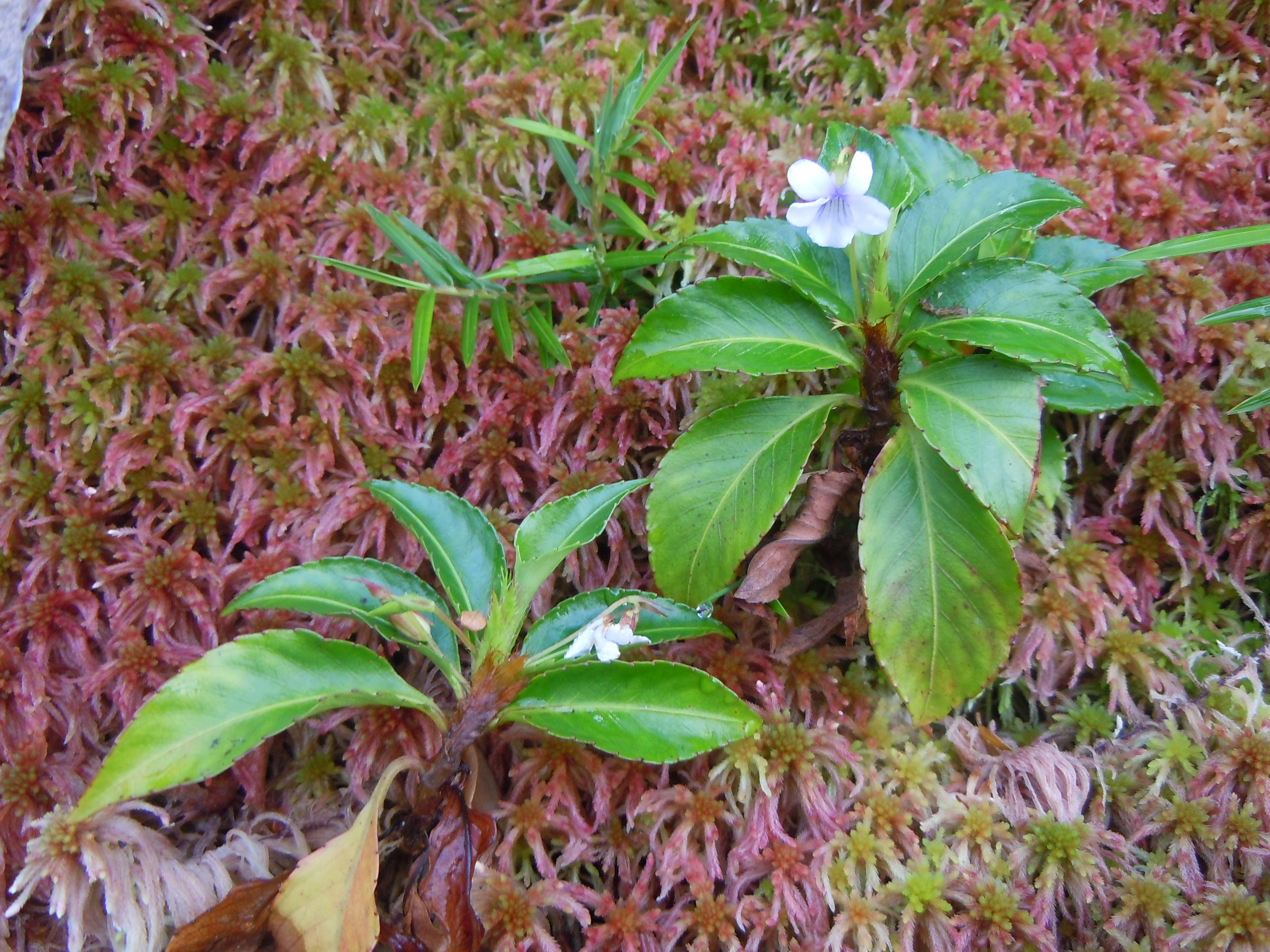
Viola stipularis

- Viola stipularis

Section Melanium (pansies)

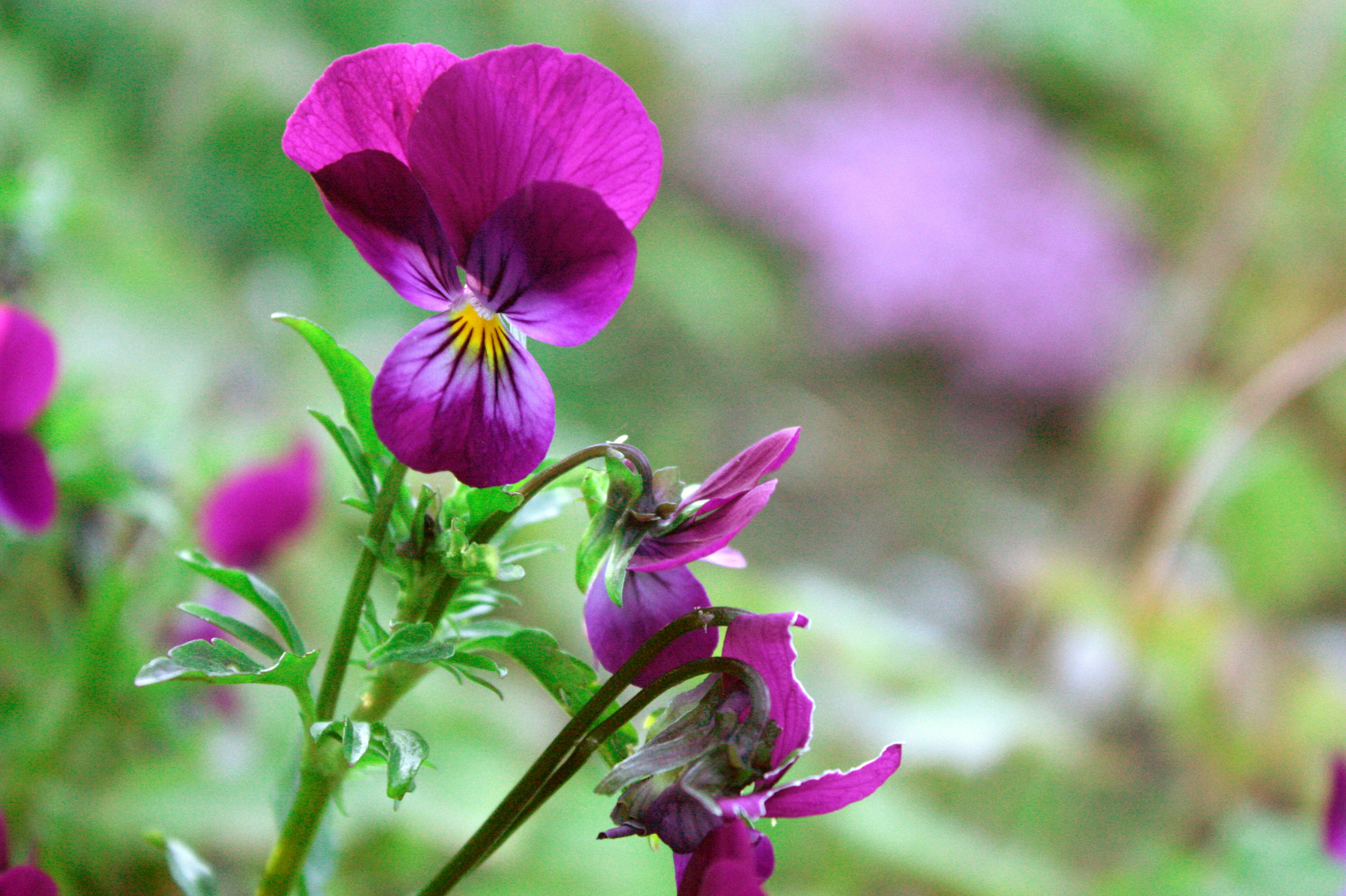
Viola tricolor

- Viola arvensis – field pansy
- Viola bicolor
- Viola pedunculata – yellow pansy, Pacific coast.
- Viola bertolonii
- Viola calcarata
- Viola cheiranthifolia – Teide violet
- Viola cornuta
- Viola lutea
- Viola tricolor – wild pansy, heartsease

Section Nosphinium

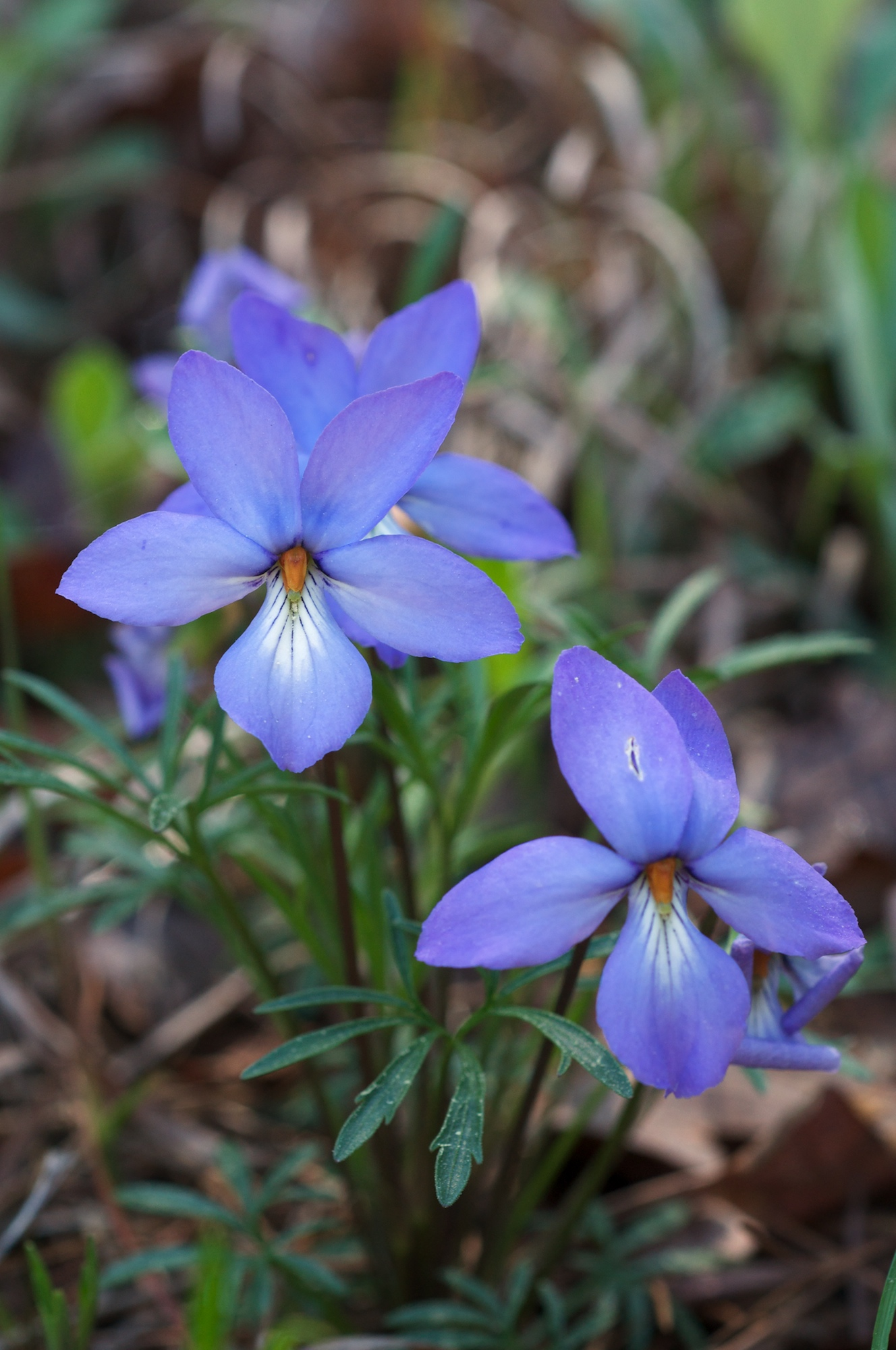
Viola pedata

- Viola pedata

Section A (V. abyssinica group)

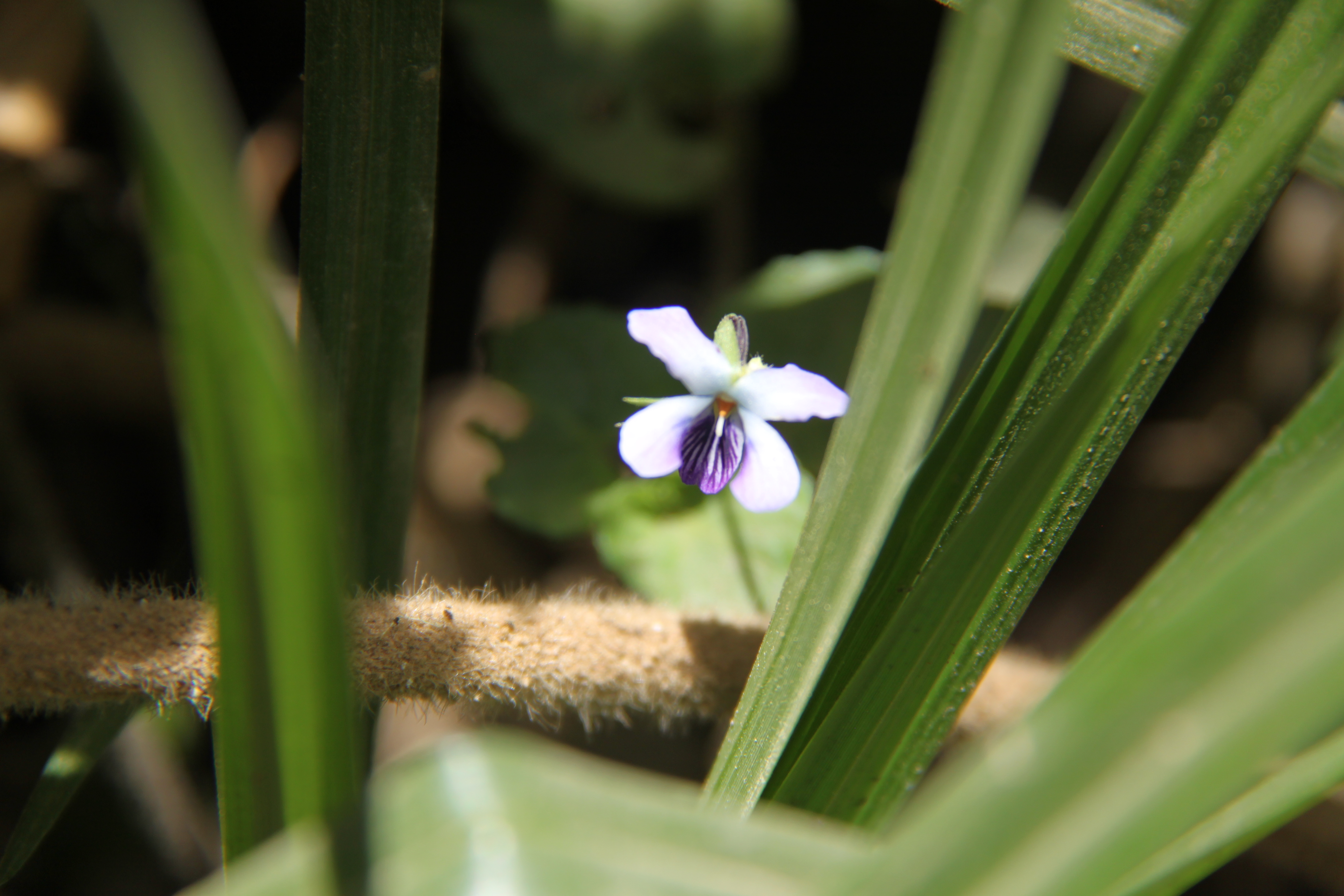
Viola abyssinica

- Viola abyssinica

Section B (V. spathulata group)

- Viola spathulata

Section Plagiostigma

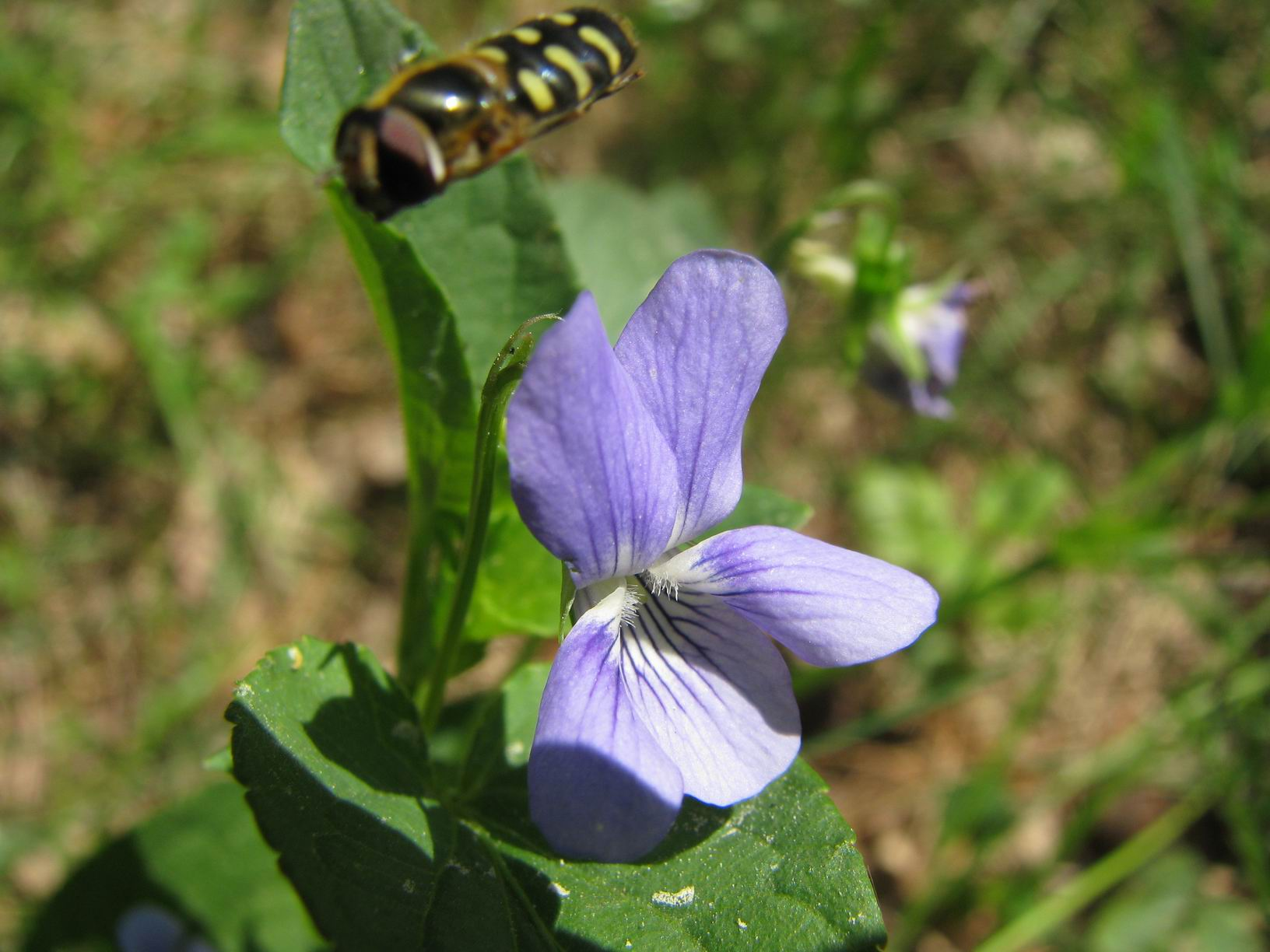
Viola epipsila

- Viola epipsila

Section Rubellium

- Viola capillaris
- Viola portalesia
- Viola rubella

Section Sclerosium

- Viola cinerea

Section Tridens

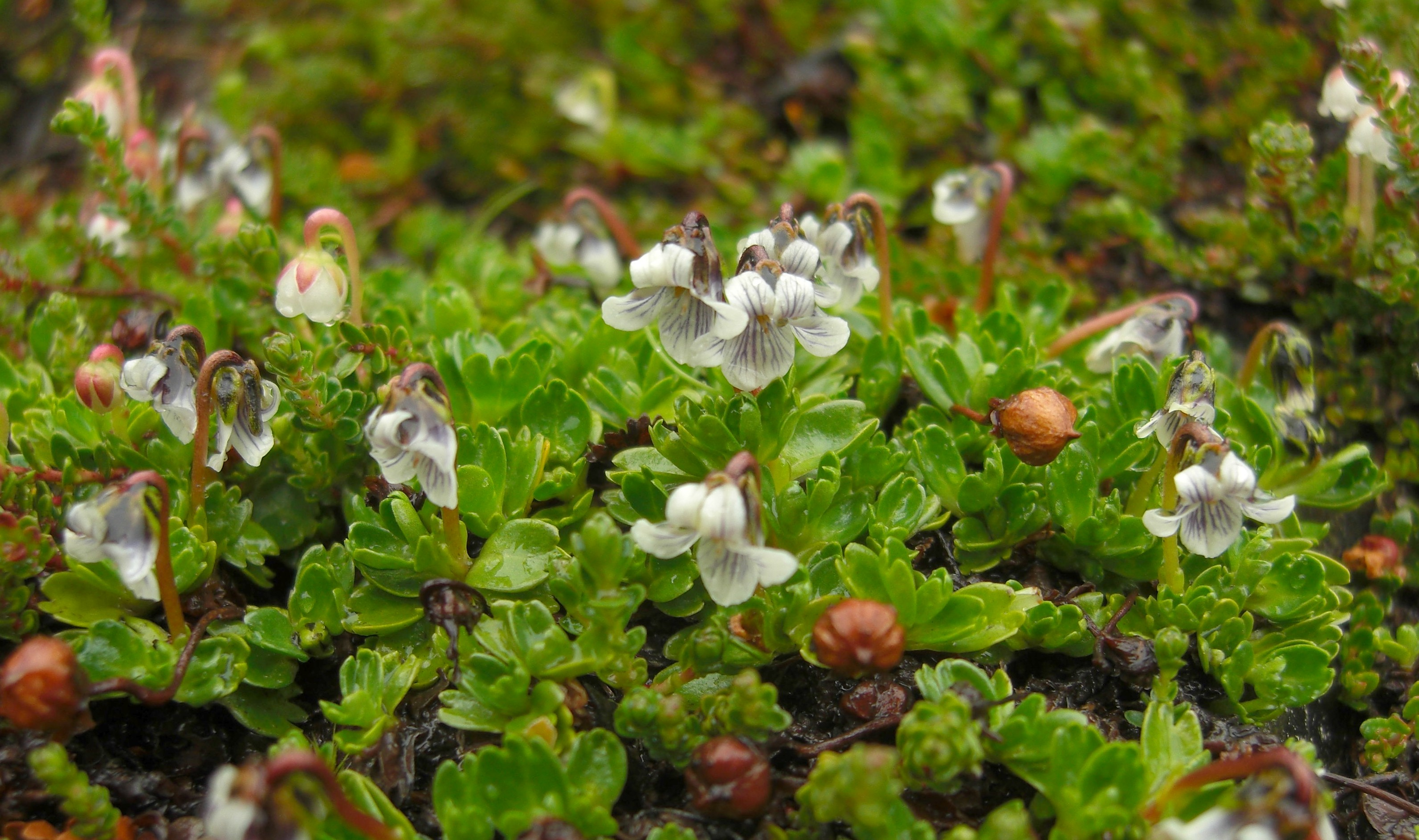
Viola tridentata

- Viola tridentata – mountain violet

Section Viola (violets)

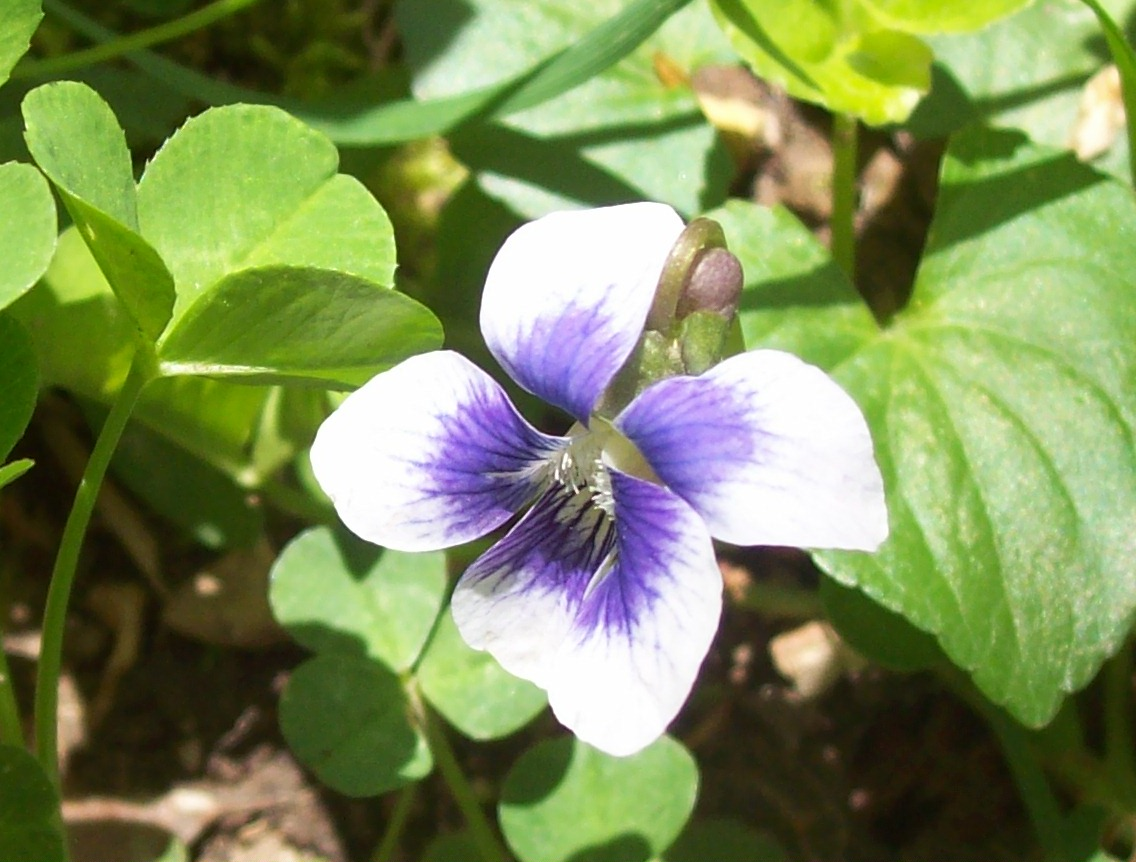
Viola sororia

- Viola canina – heath dog violet
- Viola hirta – hairy violet
- Viola labradorica – alpine violet
- Viola odorata – sweet violet
- Viola persicifolia – fen violet
- Viola riviniana – common dog violet
- Viola rostrata – long-spurred violet
- Viola sororia – common blue violet, hooded violet

Section Xylinosium

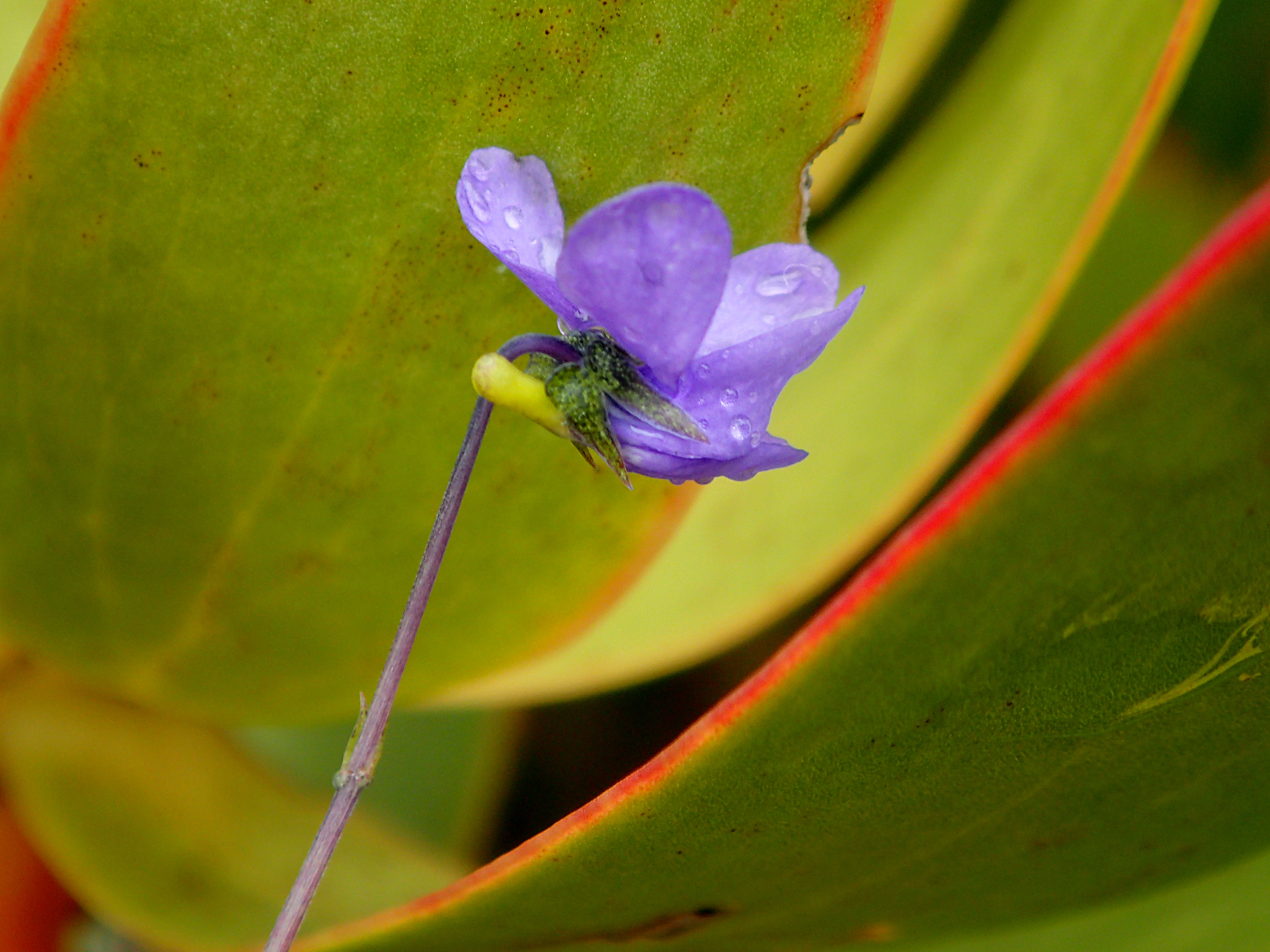
Viola decumbens

- Viola decumbens

=== Evolution and biogeography ===
One fossil seed of †Viola rimosa has been extracted from borehole samples of the Middle Miocene fresh water deposits in Nowy Sącz Basin, West Carpathians, Poland. The genus is thought to have arisen in South America, most likely the Andes.

=== Genetics ===
Habitat fragmentation has been shown to have minimal effect on the genetic diversity and gene flow of the North American woodland violet Viola pubescens. This may be partially attributed to the ability of Viola pubescens to continue to persist within a largely agricultural matrix. This trend of unexpectedly high genetic diversity is also observed in Viola palmensis, a Canary Island endemic known only from a 15 square kilometer range on La Palma island. High levels of genetic diversity within these species indicate that these plants are outcrossing, even though many violet species can produce many clonal offspring throughout the year via cleistogamous flowers. Plants that produce copious amounts of clonal seeds from cleistogamous flowers often experience increased levels of inbreeding. These reportedly high rates of outcrossing and genetic diversity indicate that these violets are strong competitors for pollinators during the early spring when they are in bloom and that those pollinators can travel considerable distances between often fragmented populations.

== Distribution and habitat ==
The worldwide northern temperate distribution of the genus distinguishes it from the remaining largely tropical Violaceae genera, restricted to either Old World or New World species, while in the tropics the distribution is primarily in high mountainous areas. Centres of diversity occur mainly in the northern hemisphere, in mountainous regions of eastern Asia, Melanesia, and southern Europe, but also occur in the Andes and the southern Patagonian cone of South America. One of the highest species concentrations is in the former USSR. Australia is home to a number of Viola species, including Viola hederacea, Viola betonicifolia and Viola banksii, first collected by Joseph Banks and Daniel Solander on the Cook voyage to Botany Bay.

== Ecology ==
Viola species are used as food plants by the larvae of some Lepidoptera species, including the giant leopard moth, large yellow underwing, lesser broad-bordered yellow underwing, high brown fritillary, small pearl-bordered fritillary, pearl-bordered fritillary, regal fritillary, cardinal, and Setaceous Hebrew character. The larvae of many fritillary butterfly species use violets as an obligate host plant, although these butterflies do not always oviposit directly onto violets. While the ecology of this genera is extremely diverse, violets are mainly pollinated by members within the orders Diptera and Hymenoptera. Showy flowers are produced in early spring, and clonal cleistogamous flowers are produced from late spring until the end of the growing season under favorable conditions. Cleistogamy allows plants to produce offspring year round and have more chances for establishment. This system is especially important in violets, as these plants are often weak competitors for pollination due to their small size.

Many violet species exhibit two modes of seed dispersal. Once seed capsules have matured, seeds are dispelled around the plant through explosive dehiscence. Viola pedata seeds have been reported being dispersed distances of up to 5 meters away from the parent plant. Often, seeds are then further dispersed by ants through a process called myrmecochory. Violets whose seeds are dispersed this way have specialized structures on the exterior of the seeds called elaiosomes. This interaction allows violet seed to germinate and establish in a protected, stable environment.

Many violet seeds exhibit physiological dormancy and require some period of cold stratification to induce germination under ex situ conditions. Rates of germination are often quite poor, especially when seeds are stored for extended periods of time. In North American habitat restoration, native violets are in high demand due to their relationship with the aforementioned fritillary butterflies.

Violet species occupy a diverse array of habitats, from bogs (Viola lanceolata) to dry hill prairies (V. pedata) to woodland understories (V. labradorica). While many of these species are indicators of high quality habitat, some violets are capable of thriving in a human altered landscape. Two species of zinc violet (V. calaminaria and V. guestphalica) are capable of living in soils severely contaminated with heavy metals. Many violets form relationships with arbuscular mycorrhizal fungi, and in the case of the zinc violets, this allows them to tolerate such highly contaminated soils.

Flowering is often profuse, and may last for much of the spring and summer. Viola are most often spring-blooming with chasmogamous flowers that have well-developed petals pollinated by insects. Many species also produce self-pollinated cleistogamous flowers in summer and autumn that do not open and lack petals. In some species the showy chasmogamous flowers are infertile (e.g.,Viola sororia). (Note: V. papilionacea is considered a synonym of V. sororia)

== Horticultural uses ==
The international registration authority for the genus is the American Violet Society, where growers register new Viola cultivars. A coding system is used for cultivar description of ten horticultural divisions, such as Violet (Vt) and Violetta (Vtta). Examples include Viola 'Little David' (Vtta) and Viola 'Königin Charlotte' (Vt).

In this system violets (Vt) are defined as "stoloniferous perennials with small, highly fragrant, self-coloured purple, blue or white flowers in late winter and early spring".

=== Species and cultivars ===
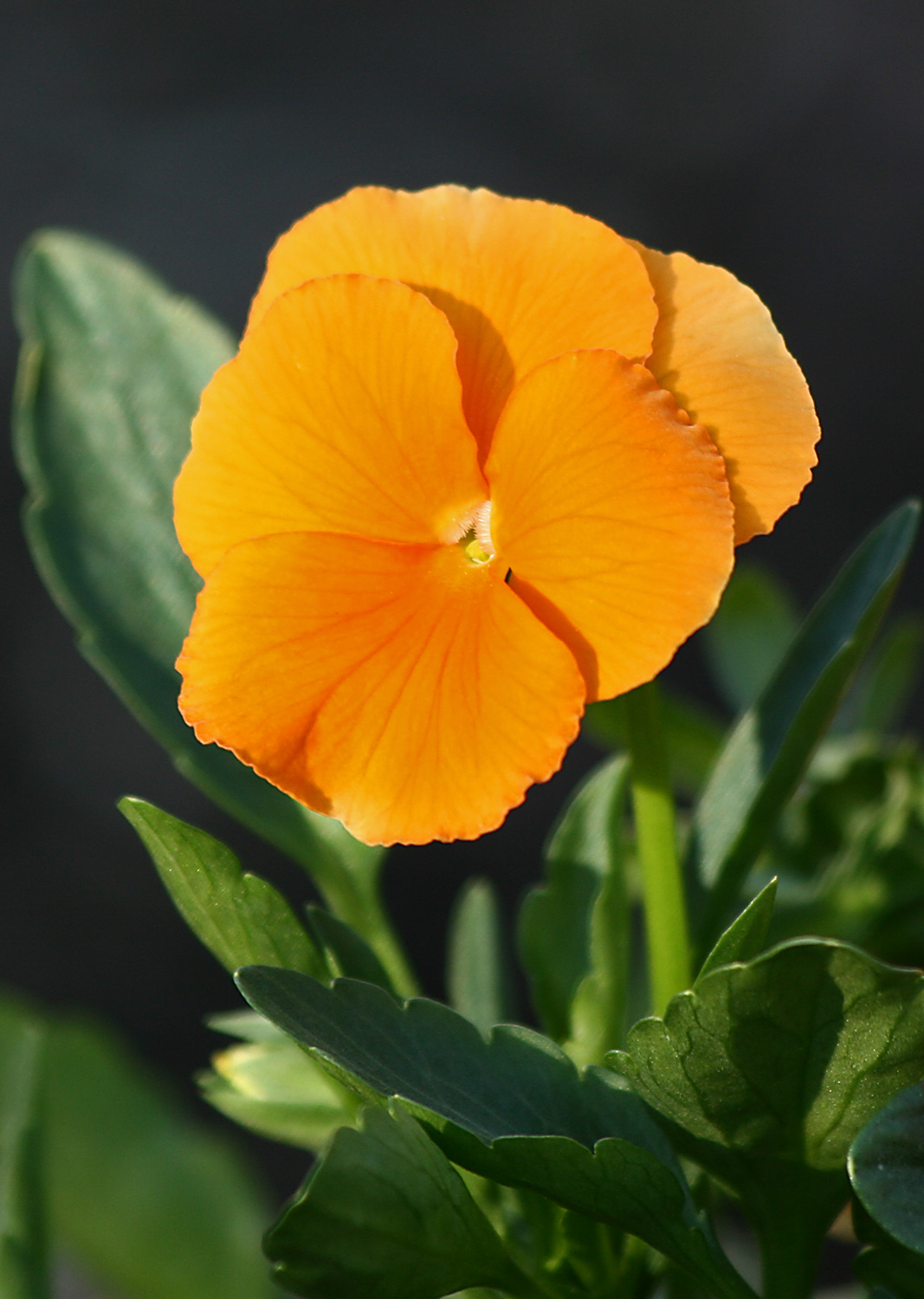
Viola cultivar showing the large round flowers and the novel coloration that has been achieved through breeding.

Many species, varieties and cultivars are grown in gardens for their ornamental flowers. In horticulture the term pansy is normally used for those multi-colored, large-flowered cultivars which are raised annually or biennially from seed and used extensively in bedding. The terms viola and violet are normally reserved for small-flowered annuals or perennials, including the wild species.

Cultivars of Viola cornuta, Viola cucullata, and Viola odorata, are commonly grown from seed. Other species often grown include Viola labradorica, Viola pedata, and Viola rotundifolia.

The modern garden pansy (V. × wittrockiana) is a plant of complex hybrid origin involving at least three species, V. tricolor (wild pansy or heartsease), V. altaica, and V. lutea (mountain pansy). The hybrid horned pansy (V. × williamsii) originates from hybridization involving garden pansy and Viola cornuta.

=== Bedding plants ===
In 2005 in the United States, Viola cultivars (including pansies) were one of the top three bedding plant crops and 111 million dollars' worth of flats of Viola were produced for the bedding flower market. Pansies and violas used for bedding are generally raised from seed, and F1 hybrid seed strains have been developed which produce compact plants of reasonably consistent flower coloring and appearance. Bedding plants are usually discarded after one growing season.

=== Perennial cultivars ===
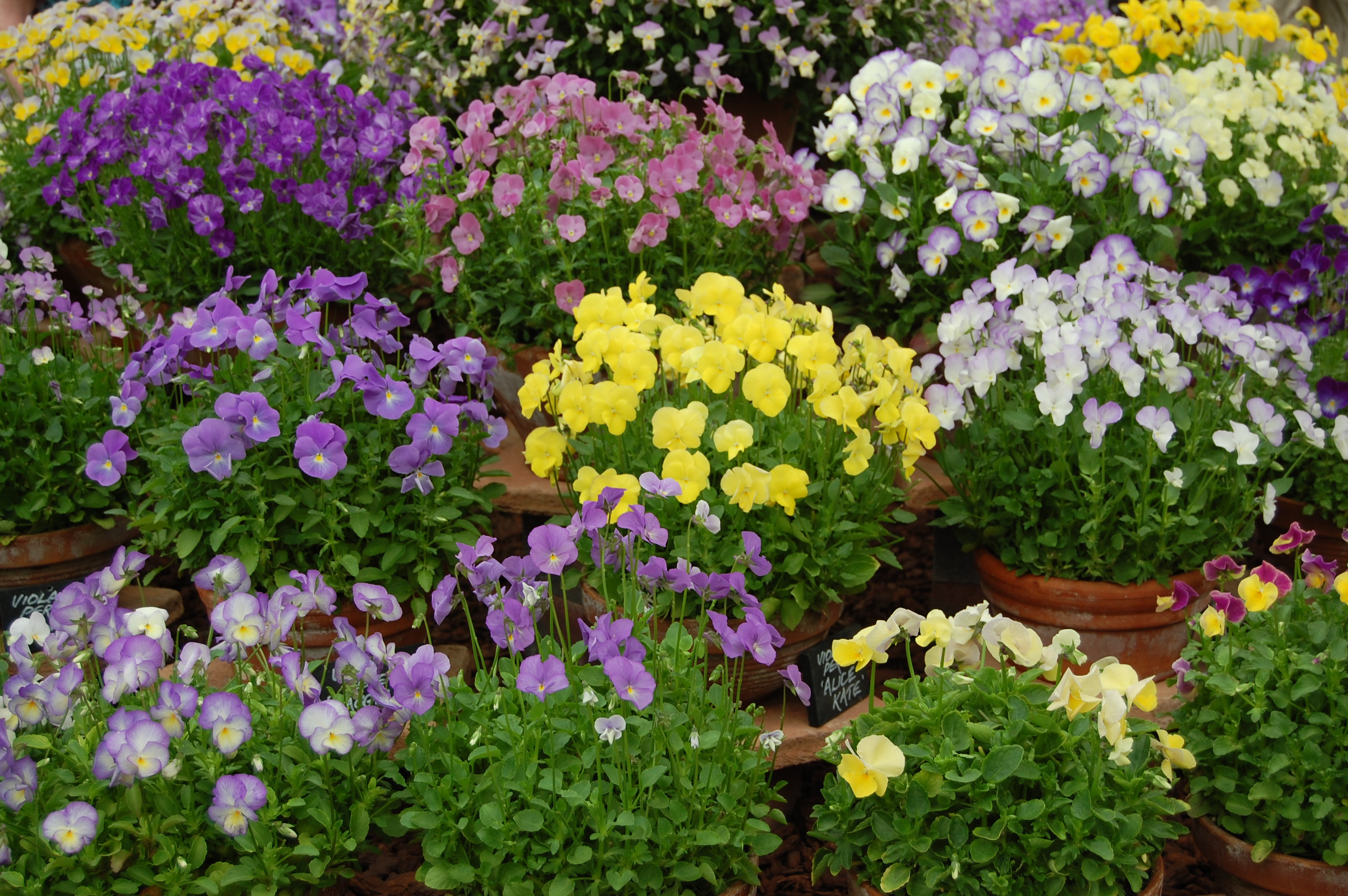
Selection of cultivated violas at the Gardeners' World Live show, in June 2011.

There are hundreds of perennial viola and violetta cultivars; many of these do not breed true from seed and therefore have to be propagated from cuttings. Violettas can be distinguished from violas by the lack of ray markings on their petals. The following cultivars, of mixed or uncertain parentage, have gained the Royal Horticultural Society's Award of Garden Merit:

- 'Aspasia'
- 'Clementina'
- 'Huntercombe Purple'
- 'Jackanapes'
- 'Molly Sanderson'
- 'Moonlight'
- 'Nellie Britton'

Other popular examples include:

- 'Ardross Gem' (viola)
- 'Blackjack'
- 'Buttercup' (violetta)
- 'Columbine' (viola)
- 'Dawn' (violetta)
- 'Etain' (viola)
- 'Irish Molly' (viola)
- 'Maggie Mott' (viola)
- 'Martin' (viola)
- 'Rebecca' (violetta)
- 'Vita' (viola)
- 'Zoe' (violetta)

== Other uses ==
=== Culinary ===
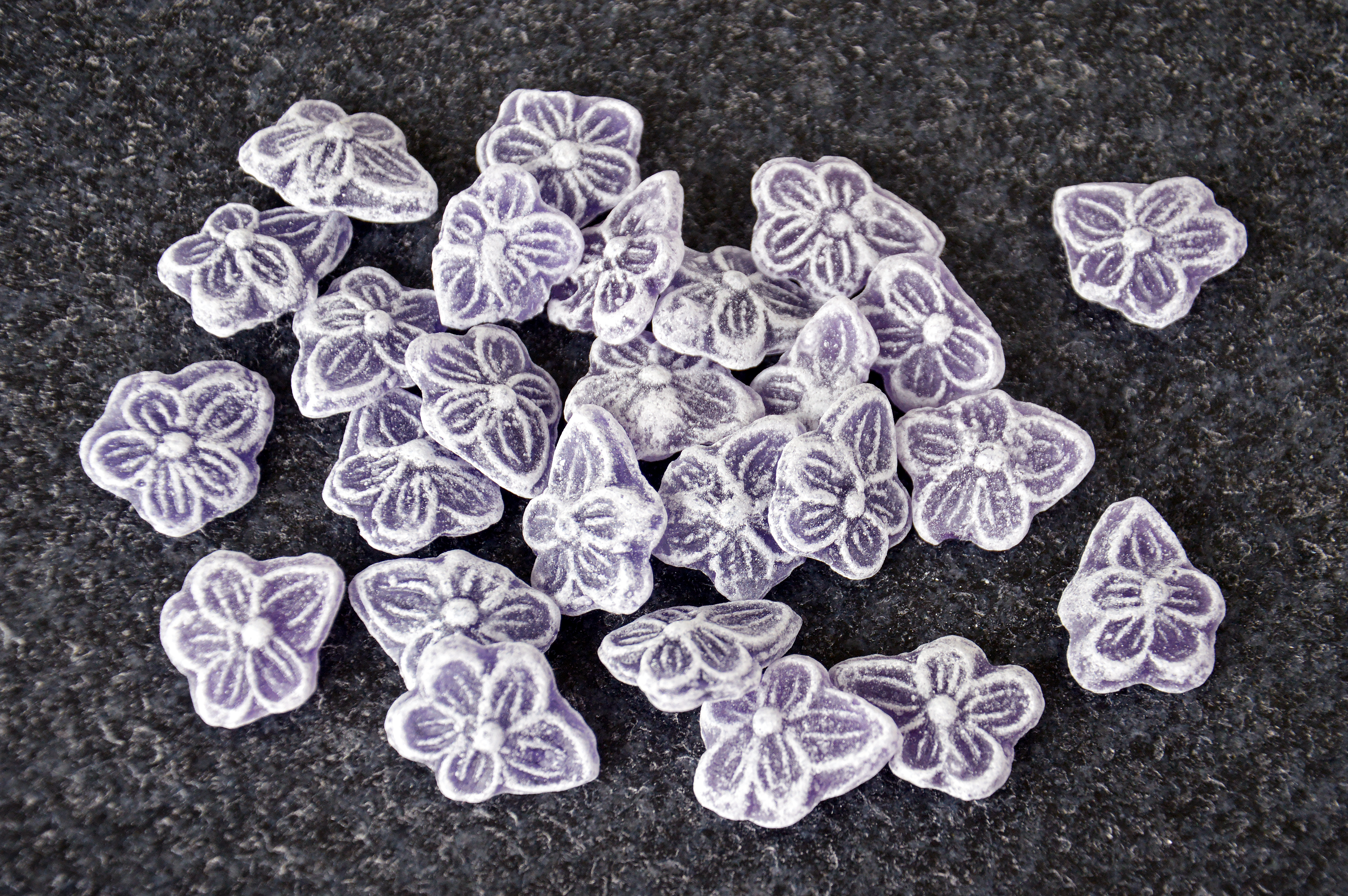
Violet-flavored candy

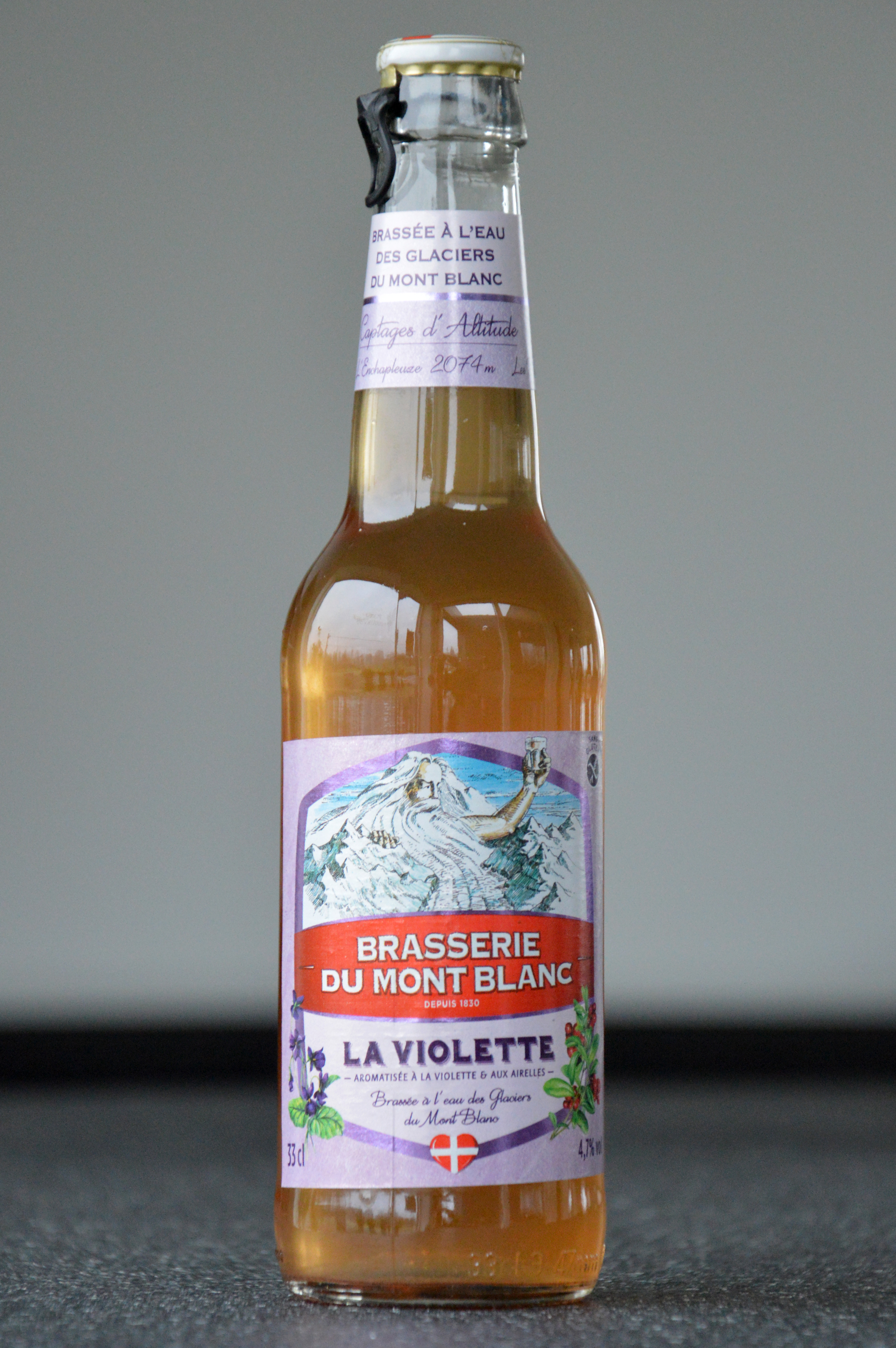
French violet-flavored beer

When newly opened, Viola flowers may be used to decorate salads or in stuffings for poultry or fish. Soufflés, cream, and similar desserts can be flavoured with essence of Viola flowers. The young leaves are edible raw or cooked as a mild-tasting leaf vegetable. The flowers and leaves of the cultivar 'Rebecca', one of the Violetta violets, have a distinct vanilla flavor with hints of wintergreen. The pungent perfume of some varieties of V. odorata adds inimitable sweetness to desserts, fruit salads, and teas while the mild pea flavor of V. tricolor combines equally well with sweet or savory foods, like grilled meats and steamed vegetables. The heart-shaped leaves of V. odorata provide a free source of greens throughout a long growing season, while the petals are used for fragrant flavoring in milk puddings and ice cream or in salads and as garnishes.

A candied violet or crystallized violet is a flower, usually of Viola odorata, preserved by a coating of egg white and crystallised sugar. Alternatively, hot syrup is poured over the fresh flower (or the flower is immersed in the syrup) and stirred until the sugar recrystallizes and has dried. This method is still used for rose petals and was applied to orange flowers in the past (when almonds or orange peel are treated this way they are called pralines). Candied violets are still made commercially in Toulouse, France, where they are known as violettes de Toulouse. They are used as decorating cakes or trifles or included in aromatic desserts.

The French are also known for their violet syrup, most commonly made from an extract of violets. In the United States, this French violet syrup is used to make violet scones and marshmallows. Viola essence flavours the liqueurs Creme Yvette, Creme de Violette, and Parfait d'Amour. It is also used in confectionery, such as Parma Violets and C. Howard's Violet candies.

=== Phytochemicals ===
Many Viola species contain anthocyanins, such as those from V. yedoensis and V. prionantha. Most violas tested and many other plants of the family Violaceae contain cyclotides.

=== Perfume ===
Viola odorata is used as a source for scents in the perfume industry. Violet is known to have a 'flirty' scent as its fragrance comes and goes. Ionone is present in the flowers, which turns off the ability for humans to smell the fragrant compound for moments at a time.

== Cultural associations ==
=== Birth ===
Violet is the traditional birth flower for February in English tradition.

=== Geographical territories ===
In the United States, the common blue violet Viola sororia is the state flower of Illinois, Rhode Island, New Jersey and Wisconsin. In Canada, the Viola cucullata is the provincial flower of New Brunswick, adopted in 1936. In the United Kingdom, Viola riviniana is the county flower of Lincolnshire.

=== Lesbian culture ===
Violets became symbolically associated with romantic love between women. This connection originates from fragments of a poem by Sappho about a lost love, in which she describes her as "Close by my side you put around yourself [many wreaths] of violets and roses." In another poem, Sappho describes her lost love as wearing "violet tiaras, braided rosebuds, dill and crocus twined around her neck". In 1926, one of the first plays to involve a lesbian relationship, La Prisonnière by Édouard Bourdet, used a bouquet of violets to signify lesbian love.

=== Tributes ===
Violets, and badges depicting them, were sold in fund-raising efforts in Australia and New Zealand on and around Violet Day in commemoration of the lost soldiers of World War I.

== See also ==
- Rosalia (festival), a festival of roses which sometimes involved violas
- Pansy

== Bibliography ==
=== Books ===
- Armitage, Allan M. (1 May 2008) [1989]. "Viola". Herbaceous Perennial Plants: A Treatise on their Identification, Culture, and Garden Attributes (3rd ed.). Cool Springs Press. pp. 1038ff. ISBN 978-1-61058-380-0.(additional excerpts)
- Ballard, Harvey E; Paula-Souza, Juliana de; Wahlert, Gregory A (2013). "Violaceae". In Kubitzki, Klaus (ed.). Flowering Plants. 11 Eudicots: Malpighiales. Springer Science & Business Media. pp. 303–322. ISBN 978-3-642-39417-1.(Also preview at Springer)
- Becker, Wilhelm (1925) [1887–1915]. "Viola". In Engler, Adolf; Prantl, Karl (eds.). Die natürlichen Pflanzenfamilien nebst ihren Gattungen und wichtigeren Arten, insbesondere den Nutzpflanzen, unter Mitwirkung zahlreicher hervorragender Fachgelehrten (in German). Vol. 21 (2nd ed.). Berlin: Duncker & Humblot. pp. 363–376.
- Cronquist, Arthur (1981). An integrated system of classification of flowering plants. New York: Columbia University Press. p. 404. ISBN 9780231038805.
- Cullen, James, ed. (2001). Handbook of North European Garden Plants: With Keys to Families and Genera. Cambridge University Press. ISBN 978-0-521-00411-4.
- Walters, S M (2011) [1984]. "Viola Linnaeus". In Cullen, James; Knees, Sabina G.; Cubey, H. Suzanne (eds.). The European Garden Flora Flowering Plants: A Manual for the Identification of Plants Cultivated in Europe, Both Out-of-Doors and Under Glass. Vol IV Aquifoliaceae - Hydropyhllacea (2nd ed.). Cambridge University Press. pp. 102–107. ISBN 978-0-521-76160-4.
- Davidson, Alan (2014). "Violet". The Oxford Companion to Food. Oxford University Press. ISBN 978-0-19-967733-7., see also The Oxford Companion to Food
- Gershoy, A (1934). Studies in North American violets. III. Chromosome numbers and species characters. Bulletin no. 367. Vermont Agricultural Experiment Station.
- Maxwell, Catherine (2017). "Perfumed melodies, Violet memories: Scent and remembrance in the nineteenth century". Scents and Sensibility: Perfume in Victorian Literary Culture. OUP Oxford. pp. 66–84. ISBN 978-0-19-100521-3.(additional excerpts as e-book)
- Robuchon, Joël, ed. (1997). "Violette". Larousse gastronomique. Larousse. p. 1106. ISBN 978-2-03-560227-5., (see also Larousse Gastronomique)
- Rendle, Alfred Barton (1925). The Classification of Flowering Plants: Volume 2, Dicotyledons. CUP Archive. ISBN 978-0-521-06057-8. (Full text available at BHL)
- Walters, Dirk R.; Keil, David J. (1996). Vascular Plant Taxonomy (4th ed.). Kendall/Hunt Publishing Company. ISBN 978-0-7872-2108-9., (also available at Google Books)

Historical sources

- Batsch, August Johann Georg Karl (1802). "Violariae". Tabula affinitatum regni vegetabilis, quam delineavit, et nunc ulterius adumbratam (in Latin). Weimar: Landes-Industrie-Comptoir. pp. 57–59.
- Bentham, G.; Hooker, J.D. (1862). "Violarieae". Genera plantarum ad exemplaria imprimis in herbariis kewensibus servata definita (3 vols.). Vol. 1. London: L Reeve & Co. pp. 114–121.
- de Candolle, A. P. (1824–1873). "Violarieae". Prodromus systematis naturalis regni vegetabilis, sive, Enumeratio contracta ordinum generum specierumque plantarum huc usque cognitarium, juxta methodi naturalis, normas digesta 17 vols. Vol. 1. Paris: Treuttel et Würtz. pp. 287–316.
- Jussieu, Antoine Laurent de (1789). "Cisti: Viola". Genera plantarum: secundum ordines naturales disposita, juxta methodum in Horto regio parisiensi exaratam, anno M.DCC.LXXIV (in Latin). Paris. p. 294. OCLC 5161409.
- de Lamarck, Jean-Baptiste; de Candolle, AP (1815) [1805]. "Violaceae". Flore française ou descriptions succinctes de toutes les plantes qui croissent naturellement en France disposées selon une nouvelle méthode d'analyse; et précédées par un exposé des principes élémentaires de la botanique (in French). Vol. IV(2) (3rd ed.). Paris: Desray. pp. 801−810. (Latin Index page 931)
- Lindley, John (1853) [1846]. "Violaceae". The Vegetable Kingdom: or, The structure, classification, and uses of plants, illustrated upon the natural system (3rd. ed.). London: Bradbury & Evans. pp. 338−339.
- Linnaeus, Carl (1753). "Viola". Species Plantarum: exhibentes plantas rite cognitas, ad genera relatas, cum differentiis specificis, nominibus trivialibus, synonymis selectis, locis natalibus, secundum systema sexuale digestas. Vol. 2. Stockholm: Impensis Laurentii Salvii. pp. 933–937., see also Species Plantarum

=== Articles ===
- Baskin, Jerry M.; Baskin, Carol C. (November 1972). "Physiological Ecology of Germination of Viola rafinesquii". American Journal of Botany. 59 (10): 981–988. doi:10.2307/2441480. JSTOR 2441480.
- Batista, Francisco; Sosa, Pedro A. (31 October 2002). "Allozyme Diversity in Natural Populations of Viola palmensis Webb & Berth. (Violaceae) from La Palma (Canary Islands): Implications for Conservation Genetics". Annals of Botany. 90 (6): 725–733. doi:10.1093/aob/mcf256. PMC 4240367. PMID 12451028.
- Beattie, A. J. (March 1971). "Pollination Mechanisms in Viola". New Phytologist. 70 (2): 343–360. doi:10.1111/j.1469-8137.1971.tb02533.x.
- Beattie, A. J.; Lyons, N. (August 1975). "Seed Dispersal in Viola (Violaceae): Adaptations and Strategies". American Journal of Botany. 62 (7): 714–722. doi:10.2307/2442060. JSTOR 2442060.
- Clausen, Jens (1964). "Cytotaxonomy and distributional ecology of western North American violets". Madroño. 17 (6): 173–197. ISSN 0024-9637. JSTOR 41423141., also at BHL
- Culley, Theresa M.; Grubb, Thomas C. (1 October 2003). "Genetic effects of habitat fragmentation in Viola pubescens (Violaceae), a perennial herb with chasmogamous and cleistogamous flowers". Molecular Ecology. 12 (11): 2919–2930. Bibcode:2003MolEc..12.2919C. doi:10.1046/j.1365-294X.2003.01971.x. PMID 14629373. S2CID 22916831.
- Culley, Theresa M.; Klooster, Matthew R. (January 2007). "The Cleistogamous Breeding System: A Review of Its Frequency, Evolution, and Ecology in Angiosperms". The Botanical Review. 73 (1): 1–30. doi:10.1663/0006-8101(2007)73[1:TCBSAR]2.0.CO;2. S2CID 12223087.
- Culley, T. M.; Sbita, S. J.; Wick, A. (13 March 2007). "Population Genetic Effects of Urban Habitat Fragmentation in the Perennial Herb Viola pubescens (Violaceae) using ISSR Markers". Annals of Botany. 100 (1): 91–100. doi:10.1093/aob/mcm077. PMC 2735295. PMID 17556381.
- Culver, David C.; Beattie, Andrew J. (March 1978). "Myrmecochory in Viola: Dynamics of Seed-Ant Interactions in Some West Virginia Species". The Journal of Ecology. 66 (1): 53–72. Bibcode:1978JEcol..66...53C. doi:10.2307/2259181. JSTOR 2259181.
- Elisafenko, T. V. (19 August 2015). "Features of seed germination in different ecological groups of the species of the section Violidum, subgenus Nomimium, genus Viola L. (Violaceae)". Contemporary Problems of Ecology. 8 (4): 523–533. doi:10.1134/S199542551504006X. S2CID 16291866.
- Freitas, L.; Sosa, M. (19 December 2002). "Floral Biology and Pollination Mechanisms in Two Viola Species-From Nectar to Pollen Flowers?". Annals of Botany. 91 (3): 311–317. doi:10.1093/aob/mcg025. PMC 4244963. PMID 12547683.
- Hildebrandt, U.; Kaldorf, M.; Bothe, H. (May 1999). "The Zinc Violet and its Colonization by Arbuscular Mycorrhizal Fungi". Journal of Plant Physiology. 154 (5–6): 709–717. doi:10.1016/S0176-1617(99)80249-1.
- Kopper, Brian J.; Charlton, Ralph E.; Margolies, David C. (2000). "Oviposition Site Selection by the Regal Fritillary, Speyeria idalia, as Affected by Proximity of Violet Host Plants". Journal of Insect Behavior. 13 (5): 651–665. doi:10.1023/A:1007887809621. S2CID 19315345.
- Łańcucka-Środoniowa, Maria (1979). "Macroscopic plant remains from the freshwater Miocene of the Nowy Sącz Basin (West Carpathians, Poland)". Acta Palaeobotanica. 20 (1): 3–117.
- Lord, E. M. (October 1981). "Cleistogamy: A tool for the study of floral morphogenesis, function and evolution". The Botanical Review. 47 (4): 421–449. doi:10.1007/BF02860538. JSTOR 4353990. S2CID 19754210.
- Park, Sungkyu; et al. (2017). "Cyclotide evolution: Insights from the analyses of their precursor sequences, structures and distribution in Violets (Viola)". Frontiers in Plant Science. 8: 92–110. doi:10.3389/fpls.2017.02058. PMC 5741643. PMID 29326730.
- Saint-Hilaire, Augustin (1824). "Tableau monographique des plantes de la flore du Brésil méridional appartenant au groupe (classe Br.) qui comprend qui comprend les Droséracées, les Violacées, les Cistinées et les Frankenicées: Violacées". Annales du museum national d'histoire naturelle (in French). 72: 445–498.
- Shuey, John; Jacquart, Ellen; Orr, Stuart; Becker, Fiona; Nyberg, Alyssa; Littiken, Robert; Anchor, Ted; Luchik, Derek (9 September 2016). "Landscape-scale response to local habitat restoration in the regal fritillary butterfly (Speyeria idalia) (Lepidoptera: Nymphalidae)". Journal of Insect Conservation. 20 (5): 773–780. doi:10.1007/s10841-016-9908-4. S2CID 25321534.
- Thiele, Kevin R; Prober, Suzanne M (2003). "New species and a new hybrid in the Viola hederacea species complex, with notes on Viola hederacea Labill". Muelleria. 18: 7–25. doi:10.5962/p.254920. S2CID 251005673.
- Tikhomirov, V. N (2015). "A revision of the genus Viola section Plagiostigma (Violaceae) in Republic of Belarus". Botanicheskiĭ Zhurnal (in Russian). 100 (5): 490–500. Archived from the original on 2020-03-17.
- Yockteng, R.; Jr Ballard, H. E.; Mansion, G.; Dajoz, I.; Nadot, S. (1 November 2003). "Relationships among pansies ( Viola section Melanium ) investigated using ITS and ISSR markers". Plant Systematics and Evolution. 241 (3–4): 153–170. doi:10.1007/s00606-003-0045-7. JSTOR 23645153. S2CID 25104565.
- Wahlert, Gregory A.; Marcussen, Thomas; de Paula-Souza, Juliana; Feng, Min; Ballard, Harvey E. (1 March 2014). "A Phylogeny of the Violaceae (Malpighiales) Inferred from Plastid DNA Sequences: Implications for Generic Diversity and Intrafamilial Classification". Systematic Botany. 39 (1): 239–252. doi:10.1600/036364414X678008. S2CID 86452033.
- Watson, John M.; Flores, R. (2003). "A new name in section Andinium W.becker of the genus Viola L. (Violaceae)". Gayana. Botánica. 60 (2). doi:10.4067/S0717-66432003000200009.
- Watson, John M.; Flores, Ana R.; Arroyo-Leuenberger, Silvia C. (25 March 2019). "A new Viola (Violaceae) from the Argentinian Andes". Willdenowia. 49 (1): 35. doi:10.3372/wi.49.49105.
- Watson, John; Watson, Anita (Fall 2012). "Fire and Ice: Rosulate Viola Evolution Part One – The Stage is Set" (PDF). North American Rock Garden Society Quarterly. 70 (4): 360–366.
- Yoo, Ki-Oug; Jang, Su-Kil (November 2010). "Infrageneric relationships of Korean Viola based on eight chloroplast markers". Journal of Systematics and Evolution. 48 (6): 474–481. doi:10.1111/j.1759-6831.2010.00102.x.
- Zhou, J. S.; et al. (2008). "Viola nanlingensis (Violaceae), a new species from Guangdong, southern China" (PDF). Annales Botanici Fennici. 45 (3): 233–36. doi:10.5735/085.045.0312. S2CID 84616726. Archived from the original (PDF) on 2014-02-20.

==== Phylogeny and taxonomy ====
- Ballard, Harvey E.; Sytsma, Kenneth J. (October 2000). "Evolution And Biogeography Of The Woody Hawaiian Violets (Viola, Violaceae): Arctic Origins, Herbaceous Ancestry And Bird Dispersal" (PDF). Evolution. 54 (5): 1521–1532. doi:10.1111/j.0014-3820.2000.tb00698.x. PMID 11108581. S2CID 10320278. Archived (PDF) from the original on September 30, 2020.
- Ballard, Harvey E.; Sytsma, Kenneth J.; Kowal, Robert R. (October 1998). "Shrinking the Violets: Phylogenetic Relationships of Infrageneric Groups in Viola (Violaceae) Based on Internal Transcribed Spacer DNA Sequences" (PDF). Systematic Botany. 23 (4): 439. doi:10.2307/2419376. JSTOR 2419376.
- Ballard, Harvey E; Iltis, Hugh H (2012). "Viola lilliputana sp. nov. (Viola sect. Andinium, Violaceae), one of the world's smallest violets, from the Andes of Peru". Brittonia. 64 (4): 353–358. doi:10.1007/s12228-012-9238-0. S2CID 14344961.
- Chervin, Justine; Talou, Thierry; Audonnet, Marjorie; Dumas, Bernard; Camborde, Laurent; Esquerré-Tugayé, Marie-Thérèse; Roux, Christophe; Cabanac, Guillaume; Marti, Guillaume (July 2019). "Deciphering the phylogeny of violets based on multiplexed genetic and metabolomic approaches" (PDF). Phytochemistry. 163: 99–110. Bibcode:2019PChem.163...99C. doi:10.1016/j.phytochem.2019.04.001. PMID 31035059.
- Danihelka, Jiří; et al. (December 2010). "Viola montana and V. persicifolia (Violaceae): Two names to be rejected". Taxon. 59 (6): 1869–1878. doi:10.1002/tax.596019. JSTOR 41059881.
- Fan, Qiang; Chen, Sufang; Wang, Longyuan; Chen, Zaixiong; Liao, Wenbo (4 February 2015). "A new species and new section of Viola (Violaceae) from Guangdong, China". Phytotaxa. 197 (1): 15. doi:10.11646/phytotaxa.197.1.2.
- Gingins, F de (1823). "Mémoires sur la Famille des Violacees". Mémoires de la Société de Physique et d'Histoire Naturelle de Genève. 2 (1): 1–27.
- Gonzáles, Paúl; Cano, Asunción (2 November 2016). "Two new species of Viola (Violaceae) named in honor of preceding Peruvian botanists". Phytotaxa. 283 (1): 83–90. doi:10.11646/phytotaxa.283.1.6.
- Magrini, Sara; Scoppola, Anna (13 October 2015). "Further studies in Viola Sect. Melanium (Violaceae). Identity and typification of Viola nana and V. henriquesii, two neglected European Atlantic taxa" (PDF). Phytotaxa. 230 (3): 259. doi:10.11646/phytotaxa.230.3.4.
- Małobęcki, Andrzej; Marcussen, Thomas; Bohdanowicz, Jerzy; Migdałek, Grzegorz; Słomka, Aneta; Kuta, Elżbieta (September 2016). "Cleistogamy and phylogenetic position of Viola uliginosa (Violaceae) re-examined". Botanical Journal of the Linnean Society. 182 (1): 180–194. doi:10.1111/boj.12460.
- Marcussen, Thomas; Oxelman, Bengt; Skog, Anna; Jakobsen, Kjetill S (2010). "Evolution of plant RNA polymerase IV/V genes: evidence of subneofunctionalization of duplicated NRPD2/NRPE2-like paralogs in Viola (Violaceae)". BMC Evolutionary Biology. 10 (1): 45. doi:10.1186/1471-2148-10-45. PMC 2834690. PMID 20158916.
- Marcussen, Thomas; Jakobsen, Kjetill S.; Danihelka, Jiří; Ballard, Harvey E.; Blaxland, Kim; Brysting, Anne K.; Oxelman, Bengt (January 2012). "Inferring Species Networks from Gene Trees in High-Polyploid North American and Hawaiian Violets (Viola, Violaceae)". Systematic Biology. 61 (1): 107–126. doi:10.1093/sysbio/syr096. PMC 3243738. PMID 21918178.
- Marcussen, Thomas; Heier, Lise; Brysting, Anne K.; Oxelman, Bengt; Jakobsen, Kjetill S. (January 2015). "From Gene Trees to a Dated Allopolyploid Network: Insights from the Angiosperm Genus Viola (Violaceae)". Systematic Biology. 64 (1): 84–101. doi:10.1093/sysbio/syu071. PMC 4265142. PMID 25281848.
- Ning, Z. L.; et al. (2012). "Viola jinggangshanensis (Violaceae), a new species from Jiangxi, China" (PDF). Annales Botanici Fennici. 49 (5): 383–86. doi:10.5735/085.049.0610. S2CID 85568012. Archived from the original (PDF) on 2014-02-20.
- Mohammadi Shahrestani, Maryam; Saeidi Mehrvarz, Shahryar; Marcussen, Thomas; Yousefi, Narjes (5 August 2014). "Taxonomy and comparative anatomical studies of Viola sect. Sclerosium (Violaceae) in Iran". Acta Botanica Gallica. 161 (4): 343–353. doi:10.1080/12538078.2014.932702.
- Whang, Sung Soo (31 December 2002). "A taxonomic study of Viola section Chamaemelanium in Korea-based on morphological characters". Korean Journal of Plant Taxonomy. 32 (4): 397–416. doi:10.11110/kjpt.2002.32.4.397.
- Wittrock, Veit Brecher (1892–1897). "Viola-studier I. Morfologisk-biologiska och systematiska studier öfver Viola tricolor (L.) och hennes närmare anförvandter". Acta Horti Bergiani: Meddelanden Från Kongl. Svenska Vetenskaps-Akademiens Trädgård Bergielund (in Swedish). 2 (1).(also available here at BHL)
- — (1892–1897a). "Viola-studier II. Bidrag till de odlade penséernas historia med särskild hänsyn till deras härkomst". Acta Horti Bergiani: Meddelanden Från Kongl. Svenska Vetenskaps-Akademiens Trädgård Bergielund (in Swedish). 2 (7).(also available here at BHL)

==== Encyclopaedias ====
- Hosch, William L. (23 April 2008). Viola. Encyclopædia Britannica.
- "Violet" . Encyclopædia Britannica (11th ed.). 1911.
- "Violets" . The New Student's Reference Work . 1914.

=== Websites ===
- "Viola". BioLib: Biological library. 2019. (taxonomy)
  - "Viola capillaris Pers".
- "American Violet Society". 2007. Archived from the original on 19 February 2020.
- "Viola 'Little David' (Vtta)". Plants. Royal Horticultural Society. 2020.
- "Viola 'Königin Charlotte' (Vt)". Plants. Royal Horticultural Society. 2020.
- "Violet, Common Blue (Viola papilionacea)". Voyageur Country: Flowering plants. 2020.
- "Natural history and research on Viola cazorlensis". Alonso-Herrera Lab. Spanish National Research Council (CSIC). Archived from the original on 5 February 2021.
- Kelly, R.O.; Deng, Z.; Harbaugh, B.K. (October 2007). "Evaluation of Viola Cultivars as Bedding Plants for Florida" (PDF). Electronic Data Information Source (EDIS). Environmental Horticulture Department, Florida Cooperative Extension Service, Institute of Food and Agricultural Sciences, University of Florida. Archived from the original (PDF) on 7 March 2025.
- "AGM Plants (Ornamental)" (PDF). Royal Horticultural Society. November 2018. pp. 109–110.

Databases

- WFO (2019). "Viola L." World Flora Online.
- POTWO. "Viola L." Plants of the World Online. Royal Botanic Gardens, Kew.
- IPNI. "Viola L., Genera Plantarum ed. 5 (1754)". Royal Botanic Gardens, Kew.
- Little, R. John; McKinney, Landon E. (2003). "Viola". Flora of North America. New York: Oxford University Press.
- Paula-Souza, Juliana de; Ballard, Harvey E. (2009). "Neotropical Violaceae". Neotropikey: Interactive key and information resources for flowering plants of the Neotropics. Royal Botanic Gardens, Kew.
- Fu, Kunjun; Ohba, Hideaki; Gilbert, Michael G. (2004). "Viola Linnaeus, Sp. Pl. 2: 933. 1753". pp. 72, 74., (in Flora of China online vol. 13)
- Karlsson, Thomas; Marcussen, Thomas, eds. (2010). "Viola L." Flora Nordica 6. Archived from the original on July 31, 2016.
- "Viola Horticultural Classification". RHS Plant Finder: Genus. Royal Horticultural Society. 2009. Archived from the original on 8 July 2009.
- "Violaceae". Wikibooks: Flora of New York. Wikimedia.

Images

- Rein, Pasi; Repo, Paula. "Violaceae". Walking routes in Spain - Plants.
- "Violaceae". Wild herbs and Alpine Plants, Japan. Flavon's Art Gallery. 2020.
- "Violaceae". Botanische-spaziergaenge: Bilder von Österreichs Flora (in German).
- "Violets (Genus Viola)". iNaturalist. National Geographic Society. includes maps
