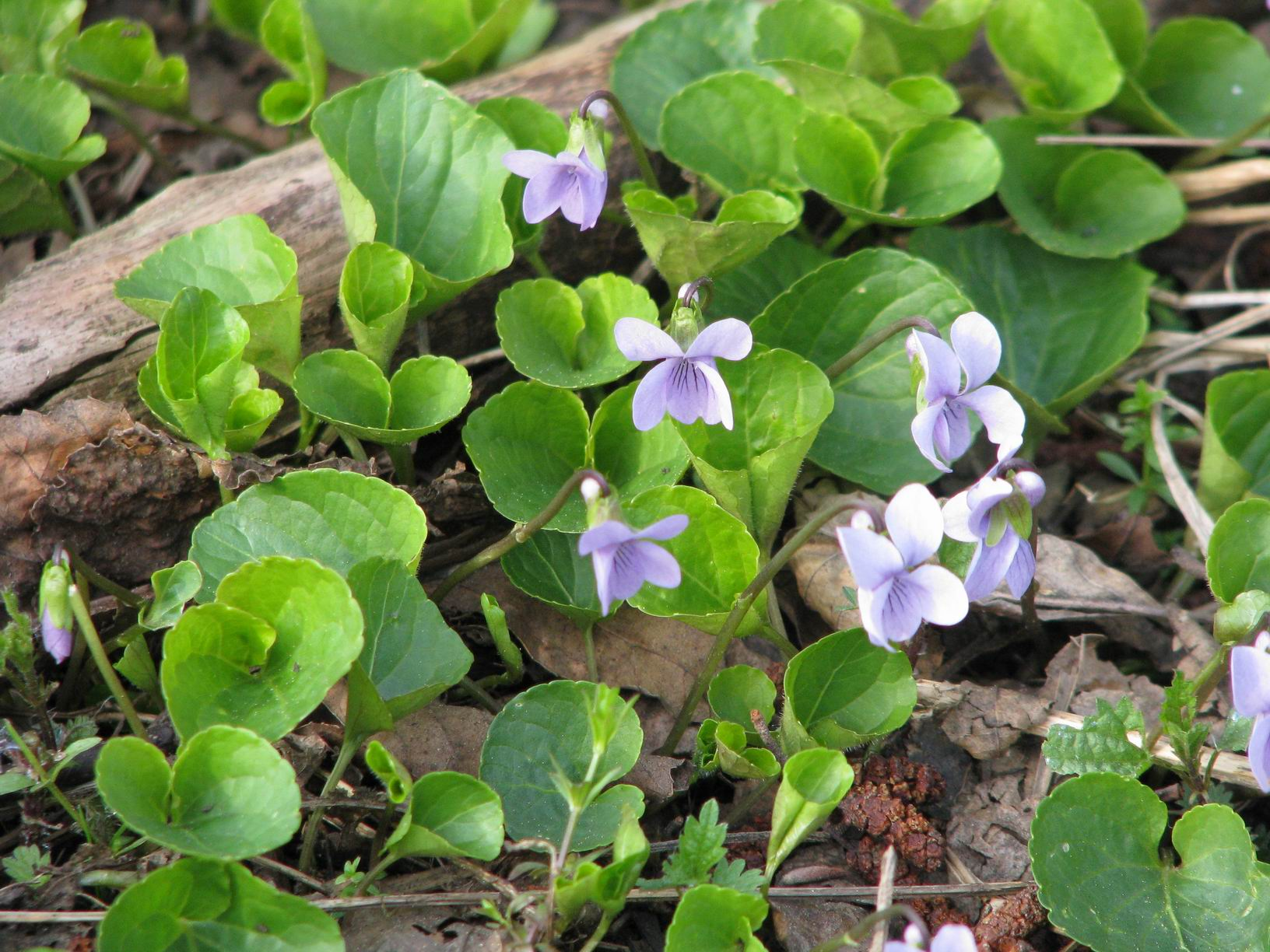
- Viola epipsila from Ivanovo Oblast, Russia

Scientific classification
- Kingdom: Plantae
- Clade: Tracheophytes
- Clade: Angiosperms
- Clade: Eudicots
- Clade: Rosids
- Order: Malpighiales
- Family: Violaceae
- Genus: Viola
- Species: V. epipsila

Binomial name
- Viola epipsila Ledeb.

= Viola epipsila =

Species of flowering plant

Viola epipsila, the dwarf marsh violet, is a species of perennial forb in the genus Viola.

It is found in Alaska, Finland, Russia, Poland, and other countries in Europe. Since the 1980s, it has spread to the eastern United States.
