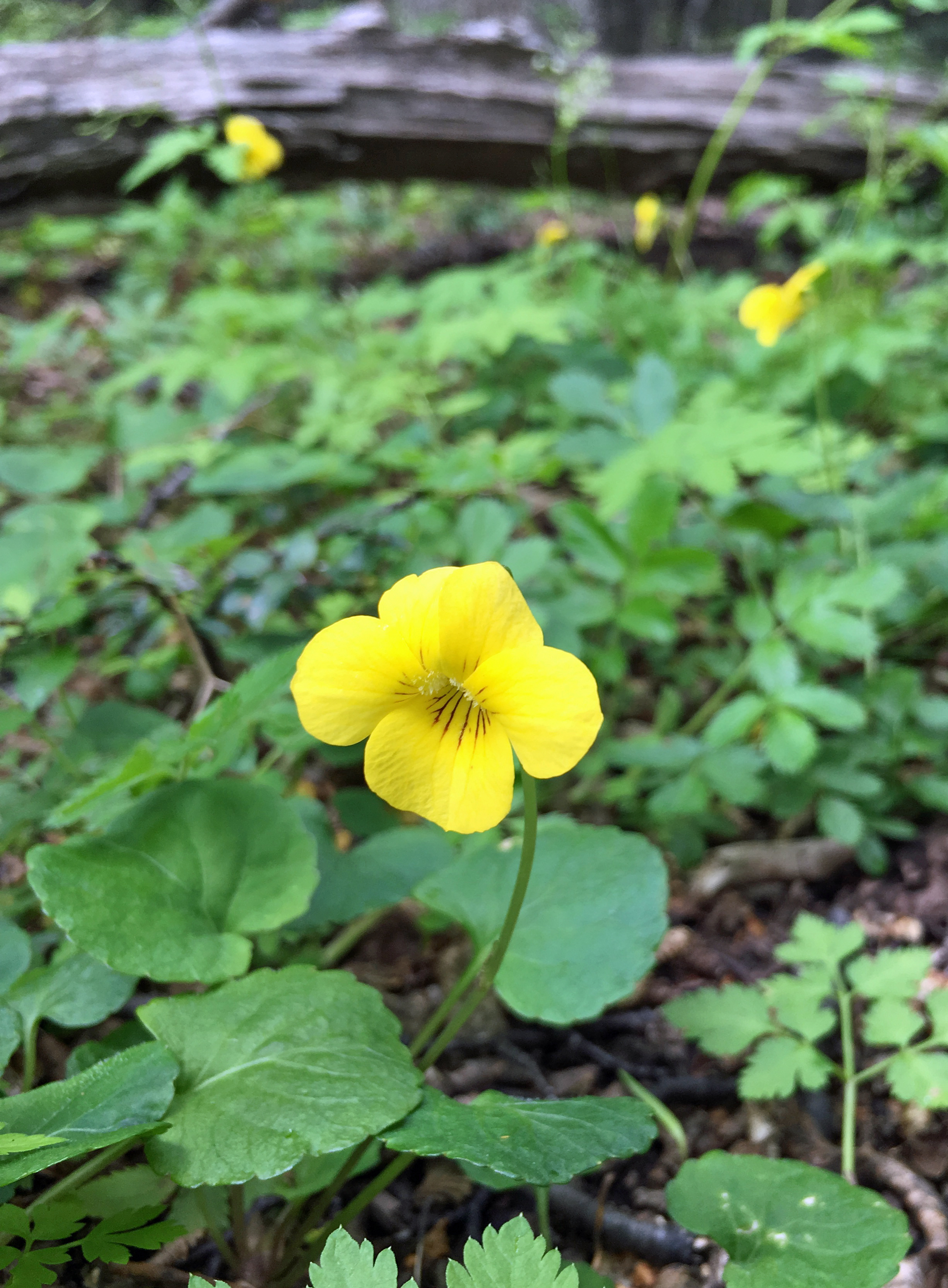

Scientific classification
- Kingdom: Plantae
- Clade: Tracheophytes
- Clade: Angiosperms
- Clade: Eudicots
- Clade: Rosids
- Order: Malpighiales
- Family: Violaceae
- Genus: Viola
- Species: V. reichei

Binomial name
- Viola reichei Skottsb. ex Macloskie

Synonyms
- Viola maculata subsp. reichei (Skottsb. ex Macloskie) Weibel; Viola reichei f. gunckelii Sparre

= Viola reichei =

Species of flowering plant

Viola reichei, also known as the Patagonian yellow violet, is a flowering plant species of the genus Viola.

== Description ==
Viola reichei is a perennial herb, which can range from 4–20 cm tall. This species leaves are green and can be either orbicular, reniform, ovate or elliptic in shape. Flowers stand above the foliage. The flowers are yellow, however the anterior petal hosts reddish lines.

== Distribution ==
Viola reichei is native to both Central and Southern Chile. It has also been recorded in the southern Andes mountain range.

It is also frequently found in Southern Argentina, in the provinces of Neuquén, Río Negro, Chubut, Santa Cruz and Tierra del Fuego.

== Habitat ==
Viola reichei be found in temperate forests where it grows in shade of trees and other vegetation.

It is also known to grow on steep slopes and south facing mountainous areas.

This species can be found at elevations ranging from 200 to 2000 m.

== Gallery ==
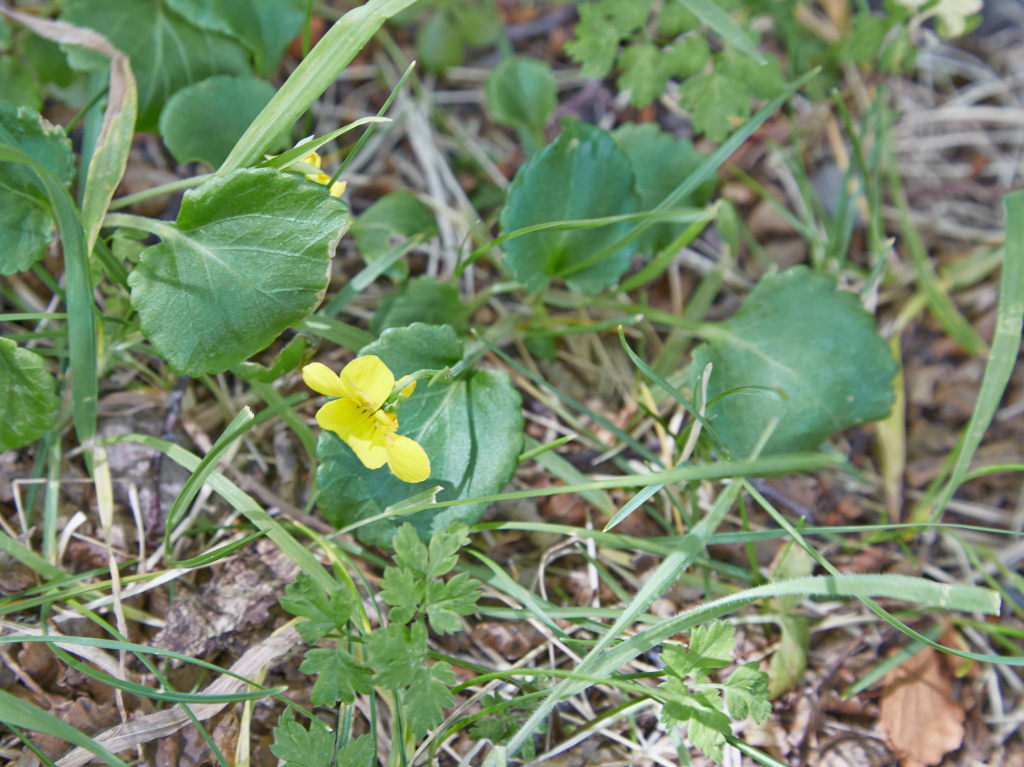
A Viola reichei plant.

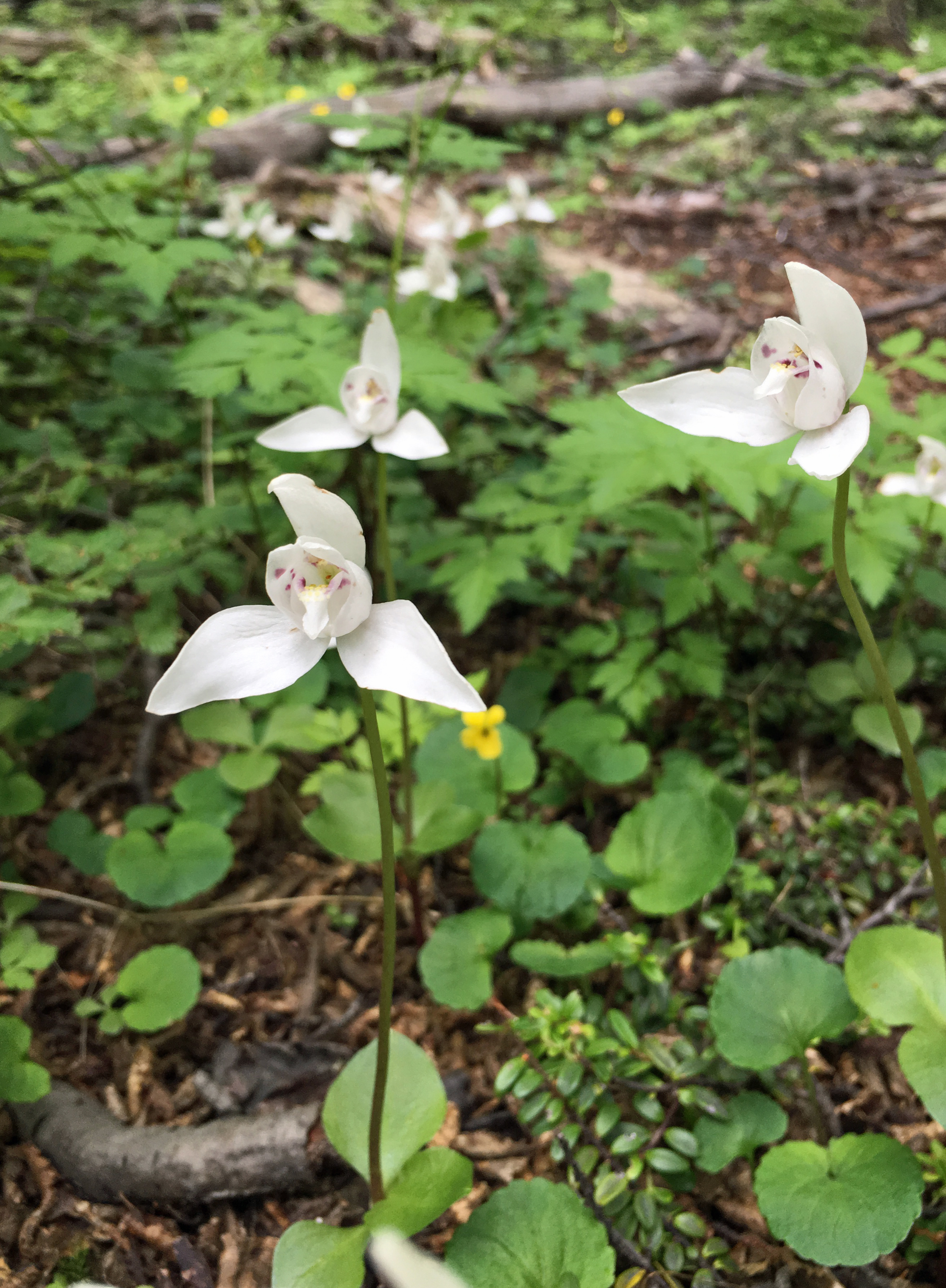
Viola reichei growing among Codonorchis lessonii in Torres del Paine National Park, Chile.
