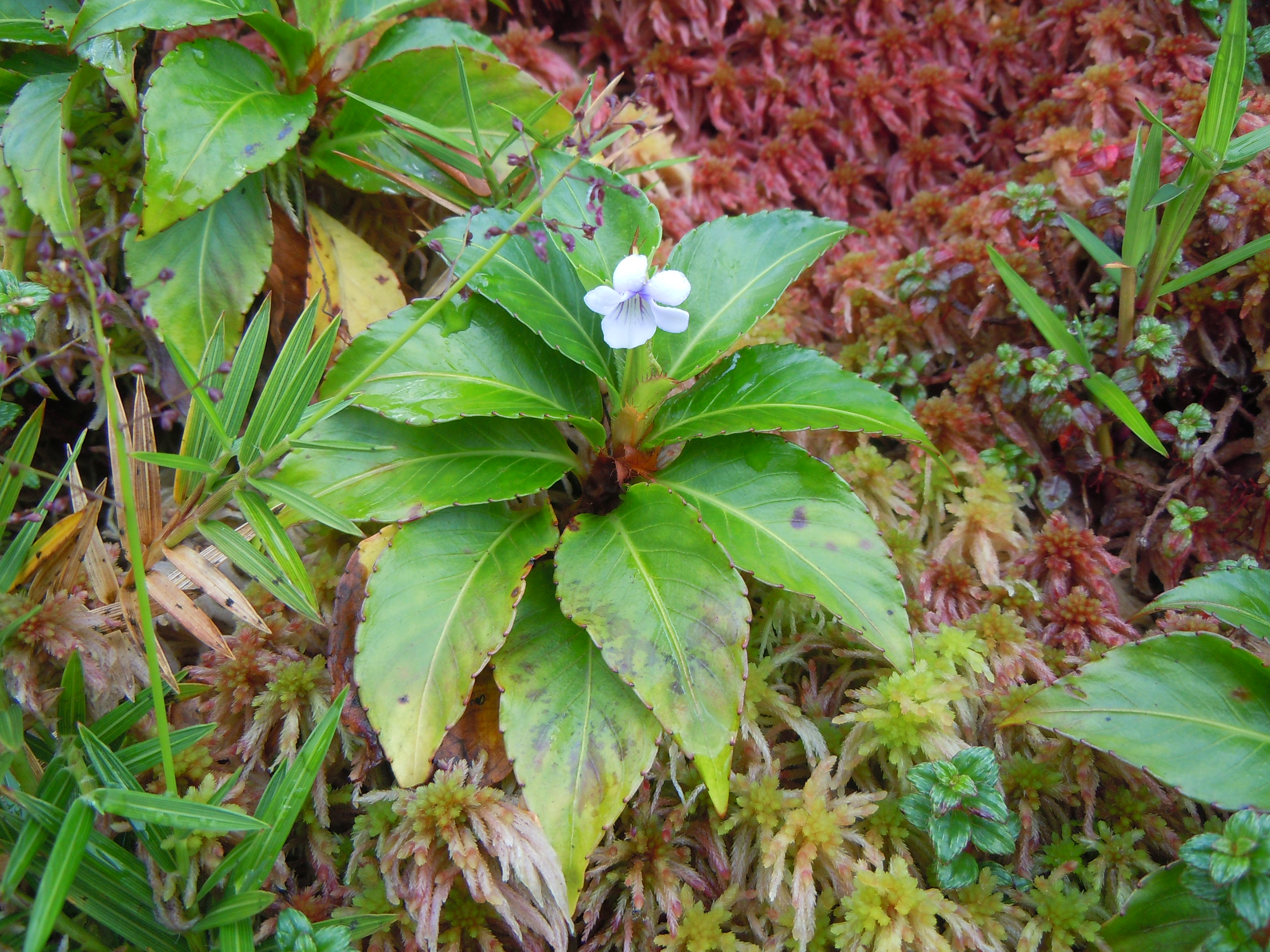

Scientific classification
- Kingdom: Plantae
- Clade: Tracheophytes
- Clade: Angiosperms
- Clade: Eudicots
- Clade: Rosids
- Order: Malpighiales
- Family: Violaceae
- Genus: Viola
- Species: V. stipularis

Binomial name
- Viola stipularis Sw.

Synonyms
- Ionidium stipulare (Sw.) Schult.; Viola begoniifolia Benth.; Viola callosa Benth.; Viola obliquifolia Turcz.

= Viola stipularis =

Species of plant

Viola stipularis, is a species of violet that grows in southern Central America, some Caribbean islands and northern South America; from Costa Rica and Guadeloupe south to Peru.

== Description ==
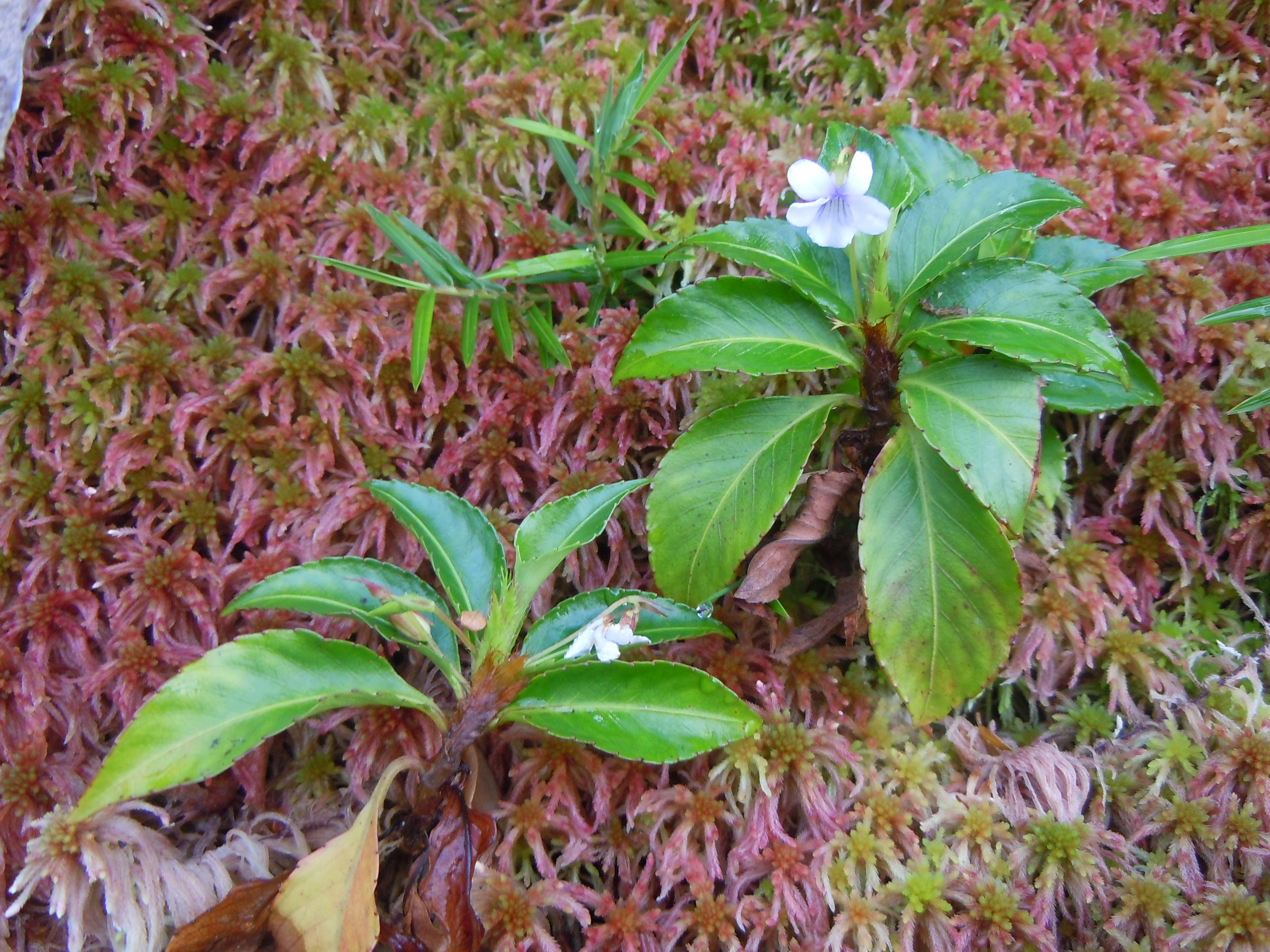
Viola stipularis at Guadeloupe.

Herb 20–30 cm tall, spreading by creeping rhizomes. Petioles up to 8 mm long, surrounded by fringed triangular stipules up to 2 cm long. Leaves elliptic to lanceolate-elliptic, up to 9.5 cm long and 3.4 cm wide, margin serrate or crenate, sometimes dentate, apex acuminate, base cuneate. Flowers with thin pedicels up to 6 cm long, petals pinkish, lavender or bluish-white, blue-veined; lower petal obovate, the upper ones oblong-ovate or oblong-elliptic; up to 9 mm long and 4.5 mm wide; all petals with rounded apex; spur ca 1 mm long; anthers and ovary about almost 2 cm long. Fruit, an ellipsoid capsule 6–7 mm long containing seeds ca 1 mm long.

== Distribution and habitat ==
Costa Rica, Panama, Lesser Antilles and northern South America south to Peru, in forested hills and montane forests between (150-) 840–3400 m.

== Ecology ==
V. stipularis can be found in open areas or near summits. It is a colonizer of disturbed habitats such as volcanic debris, and natural or human-caused landslides.
