= List of Viola species =

This is a list of species in the plant genus Viola, often known as violets or pansies.

Viola is the largest genus in the family Violaceae, containing over 680 species.

Although similarly named, neither African violets nor dogtooth violets are closely related to the true violas.

== A ==
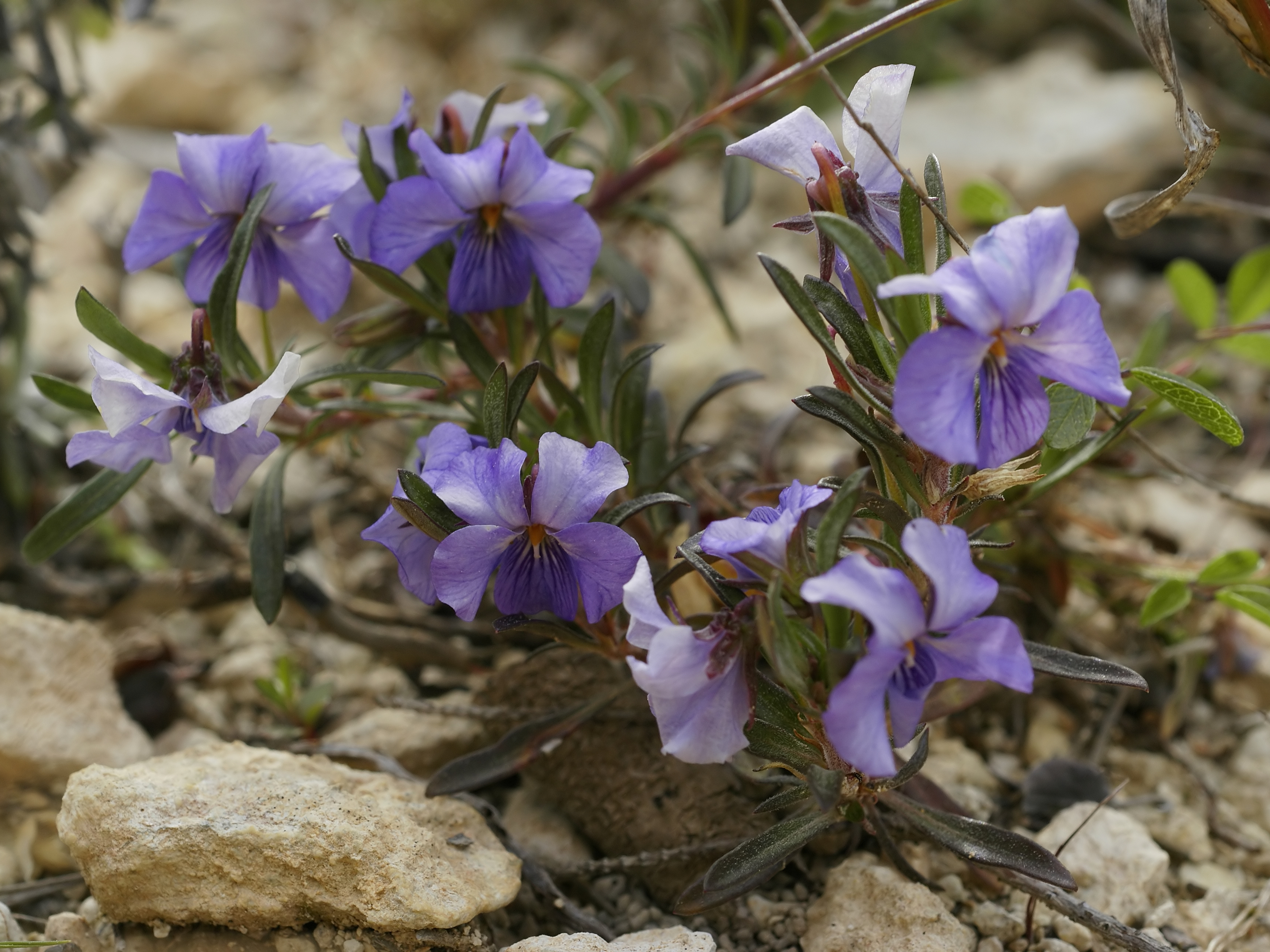
Viola arborescens

- Viola abbreviata J.M.Watson & A.R.Flores
- Viola × aberrans (Greene ex W.Stone) House
- Viola abulensis Fern.Casado & Nava
- Viola × abundans House
- Viola abyssinica Steud. ex Oliv.
- Viola acanthophylla Leyb. ex Reiche
- Viola accrescens Klokov
- Viola acrocerauniensis Erben
- Viola acuminata Ledeb. – acuminate violet
- Viola acutifolia (Kar. & Kir.) W.Becker
- Viola adenothrix Hayata
- Viola × adulterina Godr.
- Viola adunca Sm. – hookedspur violet, western dog violet
- Viola aduncoides Á.Löve & D.Löve
- Viola aethnensis (DC.) Strobl
- Viola aetolica Boiss. & Heldr.
- Viola affinis Leconte – sand violet
- Viola aizoon Reiche
- Viola alaica Vved.
- Viola alba Besser – white violet
- Viola albanica Halácsy
- Viola albida Palib.
- Viola × albimaritima Vl.V.Nikitin
- Viola × albovii Vl.V.Nikitin
- Viola alburnica Ricceri & Moraldo
- Viola alexandrowiana (W.Becker) Juz.
- Viola alexejana Kamelin & Junussov
- Viola allchariensis Beck – alšar violet
- Viola alliariifolia Nakai
- Viola allochroa Botsch.
- Viola alpina Jacq.
- Viola altaica Ker Gawl.
- Viola amamiana Hatus.
- Viola ambigua Waldst. & Kit.
- Viola amiatina Ricceri & Moraldo
- Viola amurica W.Becker
- Viola anagae Gilli
- Viola × angelliae Pollard
- Viola angkae Craib
- Viola angustifolia Phil.
- Viola anitae J.M.Watson
- Viola annamensis Baker f.
- Viola appalachiensis L.K.Henry – Appalachian violet
- Viola araucaniae W.Becker
- Viola arborescens L.
- Viola argentina W.Becker
- Viola arguta Humb. & Bonpl. ex Schult.
- Viola arsenica Beck
- Viola arvensis Murray – field pansy, European field pansy
- Viola athois W.Becker
- Viola atropurpurea Leyb.
- Viola aurantiaca Leyb.
- Viola aurata Phil.
- Viola auricolor Skottsb.
- Viola auricula Leyb.
- Viola austrosinensis Y.S.Chen & Q.E.Yang
- Viola × awagatakensis T.Yamaz., I.Ito & Ageishi

== B ==
- Viola × bachtschisaraensis Vl.V.Nikitin
- Viola bakeri Greene – Baker's violet
- Viola balansae Gagnep.
- Viola balcanica Delip.
- Viola bangii Rusby
- Viola banksii K.R.Thiele & Prober – Banks' violet
- Viola baoshanensis W.S.Shu, W.Liu & C.Y.Lan
- Viola barhalensis G.Knoche & Marcussen
- Viola barkalovii Bezd.
- Viola barroetana W.Schaffn. ex Hemsl.
- Viola × bavarica Schrank
- Viola baxteri House
- Viola beamanii Calderón
- Viola beati J.M.Watson & A.R.Flores
- Viola beckeriana J.M.Watson & A.R.Flores
- Viola beckiana Fiala ex Beck
- Viola beckwithii Torr. & A.Gray – Beckwith's violet, Great Basin violet
- Viola belophylla Boissieu
- Viola bertolonii Pio
- Viola betonicifolia Sm. – showy violet, mountain violet
- Viola bezdelevae Vorosch.
- Viola bhutanica H.Hara
- Viola biflora L. – yellow wood violet, twoflower violet, arctic yellow violet
- Viola binayensis Okamoto & K.Ueda
- Viola × bissellii House – Bissell's violet
- Viola bissetii Maxim.
- Viola blanda Willd. – sweet white violet, Willdenow's violet
- Viola blandiformis Nakai
- Viola × blaxlandiae J.M.Watson & A.R.Flores
- Viola bocquetiana Yıld.
- Viola boissieuana Makino
- Viola boliviana Britton
- Viola brachyceras Turcz.
- Viola brachypetala Gay
- Viola brachyphylla W.Becker
- Viola × braunii Borbás – Braun's violet
- Viola breviflora Jungsim Lee & M.Kim
- Viola brevistipulata (Franch. & Sav.) W.Becker – short stipule violet
- Viola bridgesii Britton
- Viola brittoniana Pollard – northern coastal violet, coast violet
- Viola bubanii Timb.-Lagr.
- Viola bulbosa Maxim.
- Viola × burnatii Gremli
- Viola bustillosia Gay

== C ==
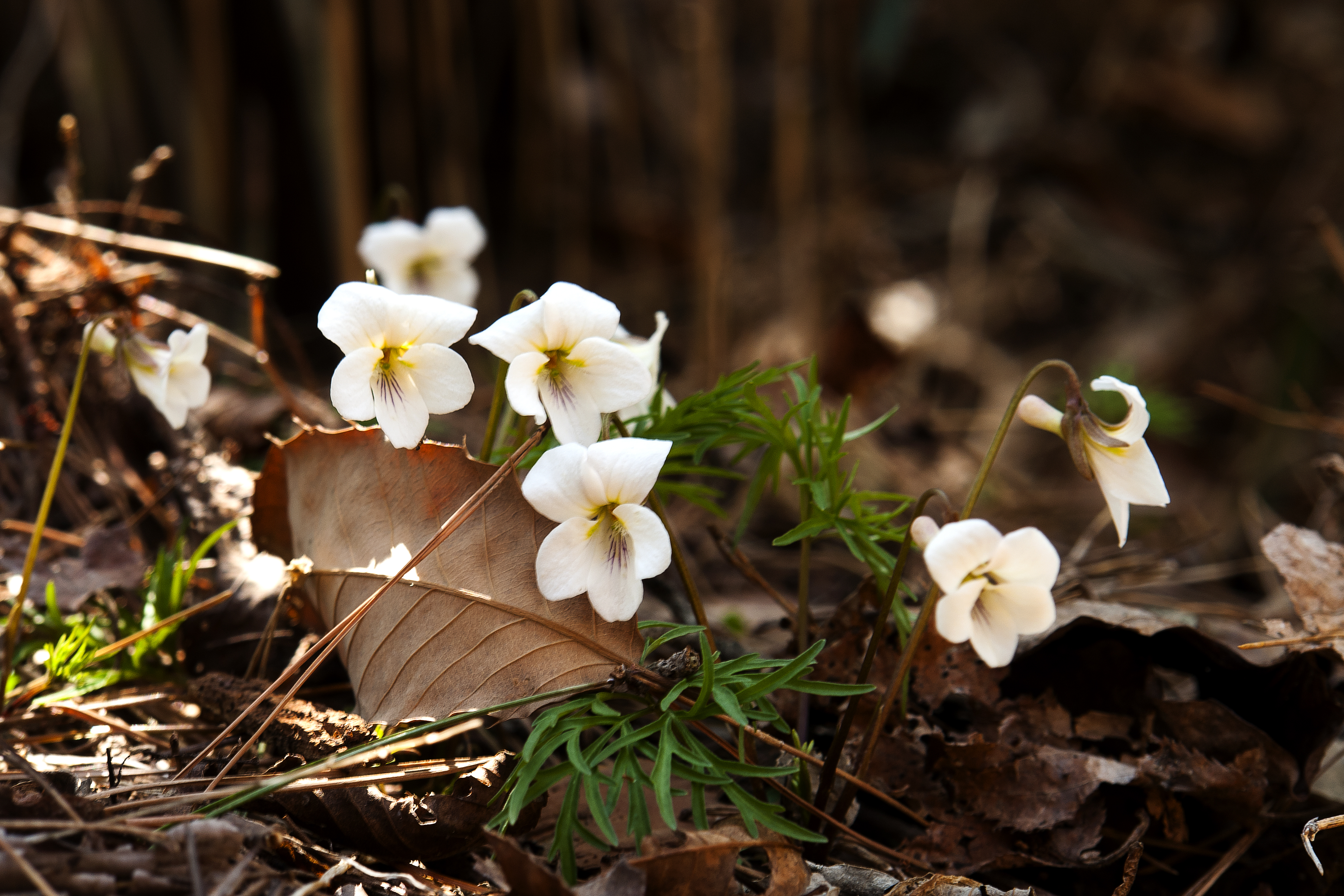
Viola chaerophylloides

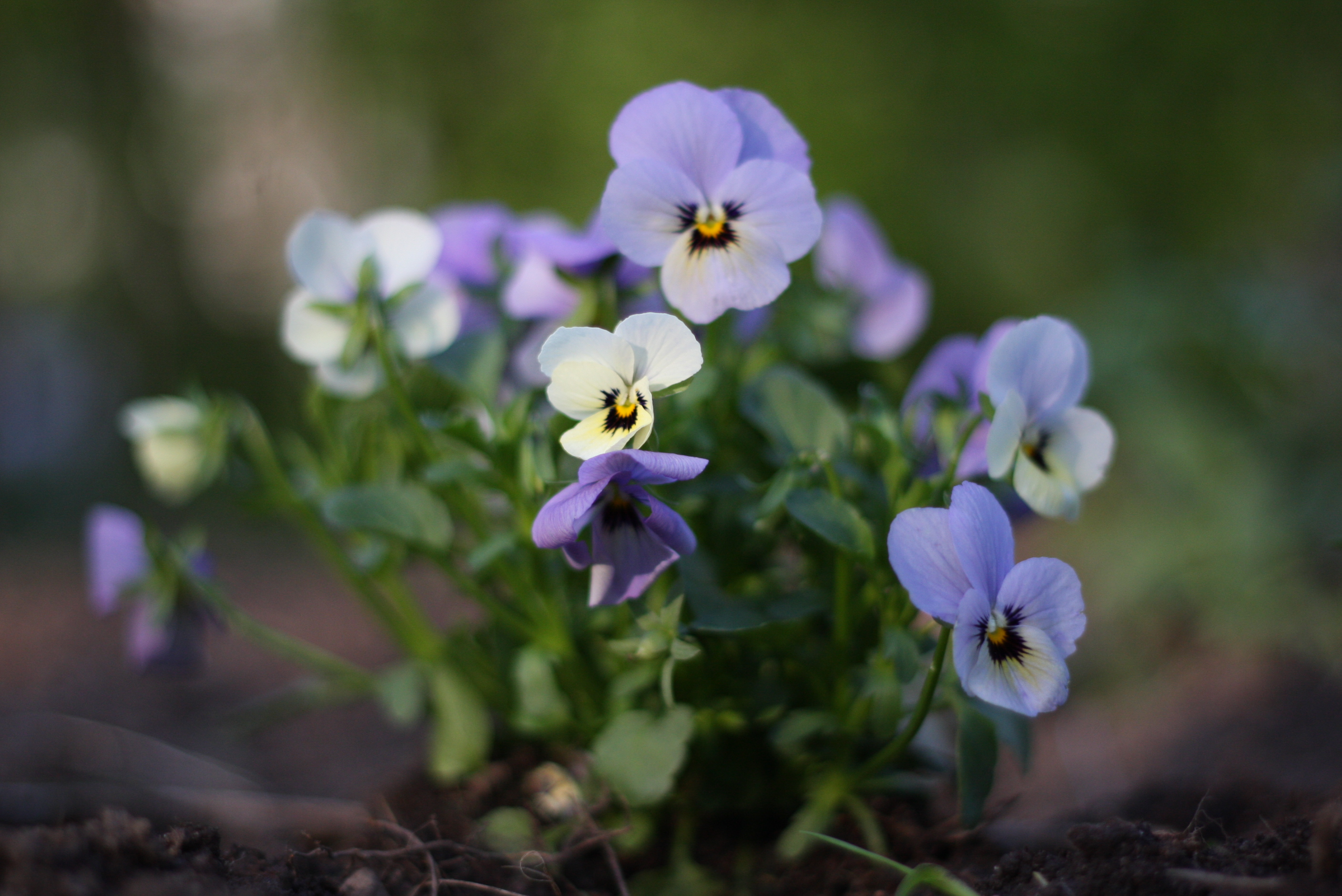
Viola cornuta

- Viola × caesariensis House
- Viola calabra (A.Terracc.) Ricceri & Moraldo
- Viola calcarata L.
- Viola calchaquiensis W.Becker
- Viola calcicola R.A.McCauley & H.E.Ballard
- Viola caleyana G.Don
- Viola cameleo H.Boissieu
- Viola canadensis L. – Canadian white violet, Canada violet
- Viola canescens Wall.
- Viola canina L. – dog violet, European heath dog violet
- Viola capillaris Pers.
- Viola caspia (Rupr.) Freyn
- Viola cassinensis Strobl
- Viola caucasica Kolen. ex Rupr.
- Viola cavillieri W.Becker
- Viola cazorlensis Gand.
- Viola cenisia L.
- Viola cephalonica Bornm.
- Viola cerasifolia A.St.-Hil.
- Viola cervatiana Ricceri & Moraldo
- Viola × cestrica House
- Viola chaerophylloides (Regel) W.Becker
- Viola chalcosperma Brainerd
- Viola chamaedrys Leyb.
- Viola chamissoniana Ging. – olopu
- Viola × champlainensis House
- Viola changii J.S.Zhou & F.W.Xing
- Viola charlestonensis M.S.Baker & J.C.Clausen – Charleston mountain violet
- Viola chassanica Kork.
- Viola cheeseana J.M.Watson
- Viola cheiranthifolia Bonpl. – Teide violet
- Viola chejuensis Y.N.Lee & Y.C.Oh – China violet
- Viola chelmea Boiss.
- Viola chiapasiensis W.Becker
- Viola × chrysantha Schrad. ex Rchb.
- Viola cilentana Ricceri & Moraldo
- Viola cilicica Contandr. & Quézel
- Viola cinerea Boiss.
- Viola clauseniana M.S.Baker
- Viola cleistogamoides (L.G.Adams) Seppelt
- Viola cochranei H.E.Ballard
- Viola collina Besser – hill violet
- Viola × columbiana House
- Viola columnaris Skottsb.
- Viola comberi W.Becker
- Viola commersonii DC. ex Ging.
- Viola communis Pollard
- Viola comollia Massara
- Viola concordifolia C.J.Wang
- Viola confertifolia C.C.Chang
- Viola congesta Gillies ex Hook. & Arn.
- Viola × conjugens Greene
- Viola × consobrina House
- Viola × consocia House
- Viola × consona House
- Viola × contempta Jord.
- Viola × conturbata House
- Viola × convicta House
- Viola × cooperrideri H.E.Ballard
- Viola × cordifolia (Nutt.) Schwein.
- Viola cornuta L. – horned pansy, horned violet, Johnny-jump-up, bedding pansy
- Viola coronifera W.Becker
- Viola corralensis Phil.
- Viola corsica Nyman
- Viola cotyledon Ging.
- Viola crassa Makino
- Viola crassifolia Fenzl
- Viola crassiuscula Bory
- Viola × crassula Greene
- Viola cuatrecasasii L.B.Sm. & A.Fernández
- Viola cucullata Aiton – marsh blue violet
- Viola cuicochensis Hieron.
- Viola culminis F.Fen. & Moraldo
- Viola cuneata S.Watson – wedgeleaf violet
- Viola cunninghamii Hook.f.
- Viola curtisiae (L.G.Adams) K.R.Thiele
- Viola cuspidifolia W.Becker
- Viola czemalensis Zuev

== D ==
- Viola dacica Borbás
- Viola dactyloides Schult.
- Viola dalatensis Gagnep.
- Viola dandoisiorum J.M.Watson & A.R.Flores
- Viola danielae Pînzaru
- Viola dasyphylla W.Becker
- Viola davidii Franch.
- Viola × davisii House – Davis' violet
- Viola decipiens Reiche
- Viola declinata Waldst. & Kit.
- Viola decumbens L.f.
- Viola dehnhardtii Ten.
- Viola delavayi Franch.
- Viola delphinantha Boiss.
- Viola demetria Prolongo ex Boiss.
- Viola denizliensis O.D.Düșen, Göktürk, U.Sarpkaya & B.Gürcan
- Viola diamantiaca Nakai
- Viola dichroa Boiss.
- Viola diffusa Ging. – spreading violet
- Viola × dimissa House
- Viola dimorphophylla Y.S.Chen & Q.E.Yang
- Viola dirimliensis Blaxland
- Viola dirphya Tiniakou
- Viola × discors House
- Viola disjuncta W.Becker
- Viola dissecta Ledeb.
- Viola × dissena House
- Viola × dissita House
- Viola diversifolia (DC.) W.Becker
- Viola doerfleri Degen
- Viola × doii Taken.
- Viola dombeyana DC. ex Ging.
- Viola domeikoana Gay
- Viola domestica E.P.Bicknell
- Viola douglasii Steud. – Douglas' golden violet
- Viola dubyana Burnat ex Gremli
- Viola duclouxii W.Becker
- Viola dukadjinica W.Becker & Košanin
- Viola dyris Maire

== E ==
- Viola × eamesii House – Eames' violet
- Viola × eclipes H.E.Ballard
- Viola ecuadorensis W.Becker
- Viola edulis Spach
- Viola × egglestoniana House
- Viola egglestonii Brainerd – glade violet
- Viola × egregia House
- Viola eizanensis (Makino) Makino
- Viola × eizasieboldii Sugim. ex T.Shimizu
- Viola elatior Fr.
- Viola elegantula Schott
- Viola emarginata (Nutt.) Leconte
- Viola eminens K.R.Thiele & Prober
- Viola eminii (Engl.) R.E.Fr.
- Viola enmae P.Gonzáles
- Viola epipsila Ledeb. – dwarf marsh violet, large marsh violet
- Viola epirota (Halácsy) Raus
- Viola eriocarpa Schwein.
- Viola ermenekensis Yıld. & Dinç
- Viola × erratica House
- Viola erythraea (Fiori) Chiov.
- Viola escarapela J.M.Watson & A.R.Flores
- Viola escondidaensis W.Becker
- Viola etrusca Erben
- Viola euboea (Halácsy) Halácsy
- Viola eugeniae Parl.
- Viola evae Hieron. ex W.Becker
- Viola × excerpta House
- Viola eximia Formánek
- Viola exsul J.M.Watson & A.R.Flores

== F ==
- Viola falconeri Hook.f. & Thomson
- Viola × fallacissima Greene
- Viola farkasiana J.M.Watson & A.R.Flores
- Viola faurieana W.Becker
- Viola × fennica F.Nyl.
- Viola ferdinandea Ricceri & Moraldo
- Viola × fernaldii House
- Viola ferrarinii Moraldo & Ricceri
- Viola ferreyrae P.Gonzáles
- Viola × festata House
- Viola filicaulis Hook.f.
- Viola × filicetorum Greene
- Viola fimbriatula Sm. – fringed violet
- Viola fischeri W.Becker
- Viola flagelliformis Hemsl.
- Viola flavicans Wedd.
- Viola flettii Piper – Olympic violet, rock violet
- Viola floridana Brainerd
- Viola flos-idae Hieron.
- Viola fluehmannii Phil.
- Viola formosana Hayata
- Viola forrestiana W.Becker
- Viola fragrans Sieber
- Viola frank-smithii N.H.Holmgren – Frank-Smith's violet
- Viola friderici W.Becker
- Viola frigida Phil.
- Viola frondosa (Velen.) Velen.
- Viola frusinatae Ricceri & Moraldo
- Viola fruticosa W.Becker
- Viola × fujisanensis S.Watan.
- Viola fuscifolia W.Becker
- Viola fuscoviolacea (L.G.Adams) T.A.James

== G ==
- Viola galeanaensis M.S.Baker
- Viola × ganeschinii Vl.V.Nikitin
- Viola ganiatsasii Erben
- Viola gaviolii Ricceri & Moraldo
- Viola gelida J.M.Watson, M.P.Cárdenas & A.R.Flores
- Viola germainii Sparre
- Viola glabella Nutt.
- Viola glaberrima (Ging. ex Chapm.) House
- Viola glandularis H.E.Ballard & P.M.Jørg.
- Viola glechomoides Leyb.
- Viola gmeliniana Schult.
- Viola godoyae Phil.
- Viola × gotlandica W.Becker
- Viola gracilis Sm.
- Viola gracillima A.St.-Hil.
- Viola graeca (W.Becker) Halácsy
- Viola grahamii Benth.
- Viola × grandis Greene
- Viola grandisepala W.Becker
- Viola granulosa Wedd.
- Viola grayi Franch. & Sav.
- Viola × greatrexii Nakai & F.Maek.
- Viola × greenei House
- Viola × greenmanii House
- Viola grisebachiana Vis.
- Viola × grubovii Vl.V.Nikitin
- Viola grypoceras A.Gray
- Viola guadalupensis A.M.Powell & Wauer – Guadalupe violet
- Viola guangzhouensis A.Q.Dong, J.S.Zhou & F.W.Xing
- Viola guatemalensis W.Becker
- Viola guaxarensis M.Marrero, Docoito Díaz & Martín Esquivel

== H ==
- Viola × halacsyana Degen & Dörfl.
- Viola hallii A.Gray – Oregon violet
- Viola hamiltoniana D.Don
- Viola hancockii W.Becker
- Viola hastata Michx. - halberd-leaf yellow violet
- Viola × haynaldii Wiesb.
- Viola hederacea Labill. – Australian violet, trailing violet
- Viola hediniana W.Becker
- Viola heldreichiana Boiss.
- Viola helena C.N.Forbes & Lydgate – Wahiawa stream violet
- Viola hemsleyana Calderón
- Viola henriquesii (Willk. ex Cout.) W.Becker
- Viola henryi H.Boissieu
- Viola herzogii (W.Becker) Bornm. – Herzog violet
- Viola × heterocarpa Borbás
- Viola hieronymi W.Becker
- Viola hillii W.Becker
- Viola hirsutula Brainerd – southern woodland violet
- Viola hirta L. – hairy violet
- Viola × hirtiformis Wiesb.
- Viola hirtipes S.Moore
- Viola hispida Lam. – Rouen pansy
- Viola hissarica Juz.
- Viola × hollickii House – Hollick's violet
- Viola × holmiana House
- Viola hondoensis W.Becker & H.Boissieu
- Viola hookeri Thomson
- Viola hookeriana Kunth
- Viola howellii A.Gray – Howell's violet
- Viola huesoensis Martic.
- Viola huidobrii Gay
- Viola huizhouensis Y.S.Huang & Q.Fan
- Viola hultenii W.Becker
- Viola humilis Kunth
- Viola × hungarica Degen & Sabr.
- Viola hybanthoides W.B.Liao & Q.Fan
- Viola hymettia Boiss. & Heldr.
- Viola × hyrcanica Vl.V.Nikitin

== I ==
- Viola × ibukiana Makino
- Viola × igoschinae Vl.V.Nikitin
- Viola ilvensis (W.Becker) Arrigoni
- Viola imbricata K.Menegoz & J.L.Celis-Diez
- Viola improcera L.G.Adams
- Viola incisa Turcz.
- Viola × incissecta Vl.V.Nikitin
- Viola incognita Brainerd – large-leaved white violet
- Viola inconspicua Blume
- Viola indica W.Becker
- Viola × indivisa Greene
- Viola ingolensis Elisafenko
- Viola × insessa House
- Viola × insolita House
- Viola × interjecta Borbás
- Viola × intersita Beck
- Viola ircutiana Turcz.
- Viola irinae Zolot.
- Viola isaurica Contandr. & Quézel
- Viola × iselensis W.Becker
- Viola isopetala Juz.
- Viola ivonis Erben
- Viola iwagawae Makino

== J ==
- Viola × jagellonica Zapał.
- Viola jalapaensis W.Becker
- Viola jangiensis W.Becker
- Viola japonica Langsd. ex Ging. – Japanese violet
- Viola jaubertiana Marès & Vigin.
- Viola javanica W.Becker
- Viola jeniseensis Zuev
- Viola × jindoensis M.Kim
- Viola jinggangshanensis Z.L.Ning & J.P.Liao
- Viola jizushanensis S.H.Huang
- Viola × joannis-wagneri Kárpáti
- Viola joergensenii W.Becker
- Viola johnstonii W.Becker
- Viola jooi Janka – Carpathian violet, Transylvanian violet
- Viola jordanii Hanry
- Viola × josephii J.M.Watson & A.R.Flores
- Viola × juzepczukii Vl.V.Nikitin

== K ==
- Viola kamtschadalorum W.Becker & Hultén
- Viola × karakulensis Vl.V.Nikitin & O.Baranova
- Viola kauaensis A.Gray – pohe hiwa
- Viola keiskei Miq.
- Viola kermesina W.Becker
- Viola × kerneri Wiesb.
- Viola × kisoana Nakai
- Viola kitaibeliana Schult. – dwarf pansy
- Viola kitamiana Nakai
- Viola kizildaghensis Dinç & Yıld.
- Viola kjellbergii Melch.
- Viola × klingeana Ronniger
- Viola kopaonikensis Pančić ex Tomović & Niketić
- Viola kosanensis Hayata
- Viola kosaninii (Degen) Hayek – Košanin violet
- Viola kouliana Bhellum & Magotra
- Viola × kozo-poljanskii Grosset
- Viola × krascheninnikoviorum Vl.V.Nikitin
- Viola kunawarensis Royle
- Viola kusanoana Makino
- Viola kusnezowiana W.Becker

== L ==
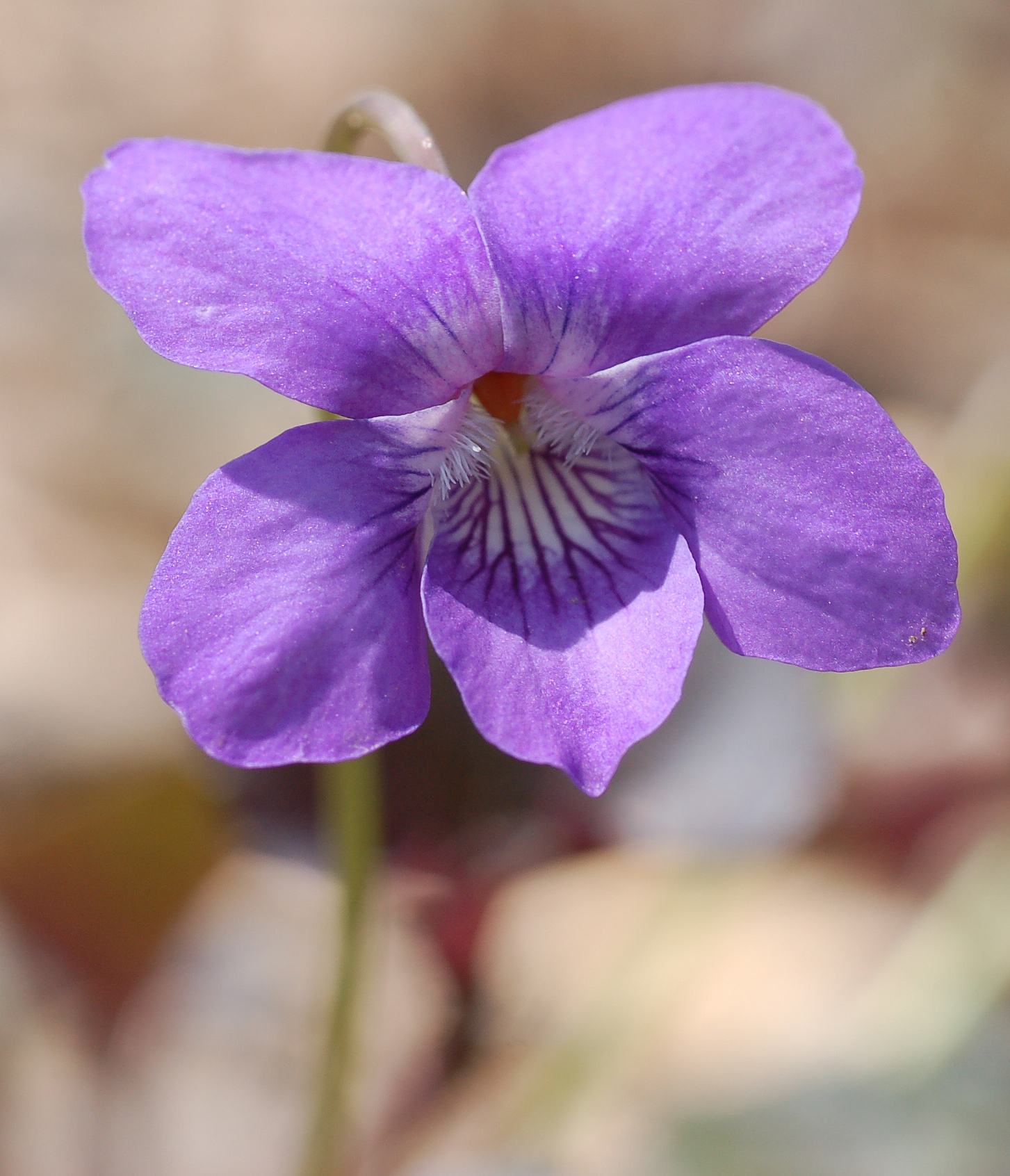
Viola labradorica

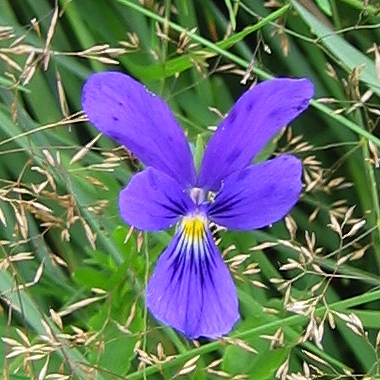
Viola lutea

- Viola labradorica Schrank – alpine violet, Labrador violet
- Viola × lacmonica Hausskn.
- Viola lactea Sm. – pale dog violet
- Viola lactiflora Nakai
- Viola lainzii P.Monts.
- Viola lanaiensis W.Becker – Hawaii violet
- Viola lanceolata L. – bog white violet
- Viola langeana Valentine
- Viola langloisii Greene
- Viola langsdorffii Fisch. ex Ging. – Aleutian violet, Alaska violet
- Viola lanifera W.Becker
- Viola laricicola Marcussen
- Viola latistipula Hemsl.
- Viola latiuscula Greene
- Viola × lavandulacea E.P.Bicknell
- Viola lehmannii W.Becker
- Viola leyboldiana Phil.
- Viola libanotica Boiss.
- Viola lilliputana Iltis & H.E.Ballard – Lilliputian violet
- Viola lilloana W.Becker
- Viola limbarae (Merxm. & W.Lippert) Arrigoni
- Viola lithion N.H.Holmgren & P.K.Holmgren – rock violet
- Viola × litoralis Spreng.
- Viola livonica Vl.V.Nikitin
- Viola llullaillacoensis W.Becker
- Viola lobata Benth. – moosehorn violet, yellow wood violet, pine violet
- Viola lologensis (W.Becker) J.M.Watson
- Viola longibracteolata P.Gonzáles, Ed.Navarro & J.M.Watson
- Viola longipetiolata Ricceri & Moraldo
- Viola lovelliana Brainerd
- Viola lucens W.Becker
- Viola × luciae Skottsb. – Lucy's violet
- Viola lungtungensis S.S.Ying
- Viola lutea Huds. – mountain pansy
- Viola × lutzii E.G.Camus
- Viola lyallii Hook.f. – New Zealand native violet, haaka

== M ==
- Viola macloskeyi F.E.Lloyd – small white violet, western sweet white violet
- Viola macroceras Bunge
- Viola maculata Cav.
- Viola magellanica G.Forst.
- Viola magellensis Porta & Rigo ex Strobl
- Viola magnifica C.J.Wang & X.D.Wang
- Viola majchurensis Pissjauk.
- Viola × malteana House
- Viola mandonii W.Becker
- Viola mandshurica W.Becker – Fuji dawn
- Viola maoershanensis Y.S.Chen & Q.E.Yang
- Viola marcelaferreyrae Nicola, J.M.Watson & A.R.Flores
- Viola marcelorosasii J.M.Watson & A.R.Flores
- Viola × markgrafii W.Becker
- Viola maroccana (Maire) Maire
- Viola × marylandica House
- Viola × matczkasensis Vl.V.Nikitin
- Viola matronae Stepanov
- Viola mauritii Tepl.
- Viola maviensis H.Mann – Hawaii bog violet
- Viola maximowicziana Makino
- Viola maymanica Grey-Wilson
- Viola mearnsii Merr.
- Viola × melissifolia Greene
- Viola membranacea W.Becker
- Viola × menitzkii Vl.V.Nikitin
- Viola mercurii Orph. ex Halácsy
- Viola merrilliana W.Becker
- Viola merxmuelleri Erben
- Viola mesadensis W.Becker
- Viola miaolingensis Y.S.Chen
- Viola micranthella Wedd.
- Viola microcentra W.Becker
- Viola microphylla Phil.
- Viola milanae Vl.V.Nikitin
- Viola × militaris Savouré
- Viola minuscula Greene
- Viola minuta M.Bieb.
- Viola minutiflora Phil.
- Viola mirabilis L. – wonder violet
- Viola missouriensis Greene – Missouri violet, banded violet
- Viola × mistura House
- Viola × mixta A.Kern.
- Viola modesta Fenzl
- Viola × modica House
- Viola molisana Ricceri & Moraldo
- Viola × mollicula House
- Viola mongolica Franch.
- Viola montagnei Gay
- Viola montcaunica Pau
- Viola × montivaga House
- Viola moupinensis Franch.
- Viola mucronulifera Hand.-Mazz.
- Viola muehldorfii Kiss
- Viola × mulfordiae Pollard – Mulford's violet
- Viola muliensis Y.S.Chen & Q.E.Yang
- Viola munbyana Boiss. & Reut.
- Viola murronensis Ricceri & Moraldo
- Viola muscoides Phil.

== N ==
- Viola nagasawae Makino & Hayata
- Viola × najadum Wein
- Viola nana (DC. ex Ging.) Le Jol.
- Viola nanlingensis J.S.Zhou & F.W.Xing
- Viola nannae R.E.Fr.
- Viola nannei Pol.
- Viola nassauvioides Phil.
- Viola nebrodensis C.Presl
- Viola × neglectiformis Vl.V.Nikitin
- Viola nemoralis Kütz.
- Viola nephrophylla Greene – northern bog violet
- Viola × nephrophylloides Farw.
- Viola niederleinii W.Becker
- Viola × nikitinii Vasjukov
- Viola nitida Y.S.Chen & Q.E.Yang
- Viola nobilis W.Becker
- Viola × notabilis E.P.Bicknell
- Viola novae-angliae House – New England blue violet
- Viola nubigena Leyb.
- Viola nuda W.Becker
- Viola nujiangensis Y.S.Chen & X.H.Jin
- Viola nummulariifolia Vill.
- Viola nuttallii Pursh – Nuttall's violet, yellow prairie violet

== O ==
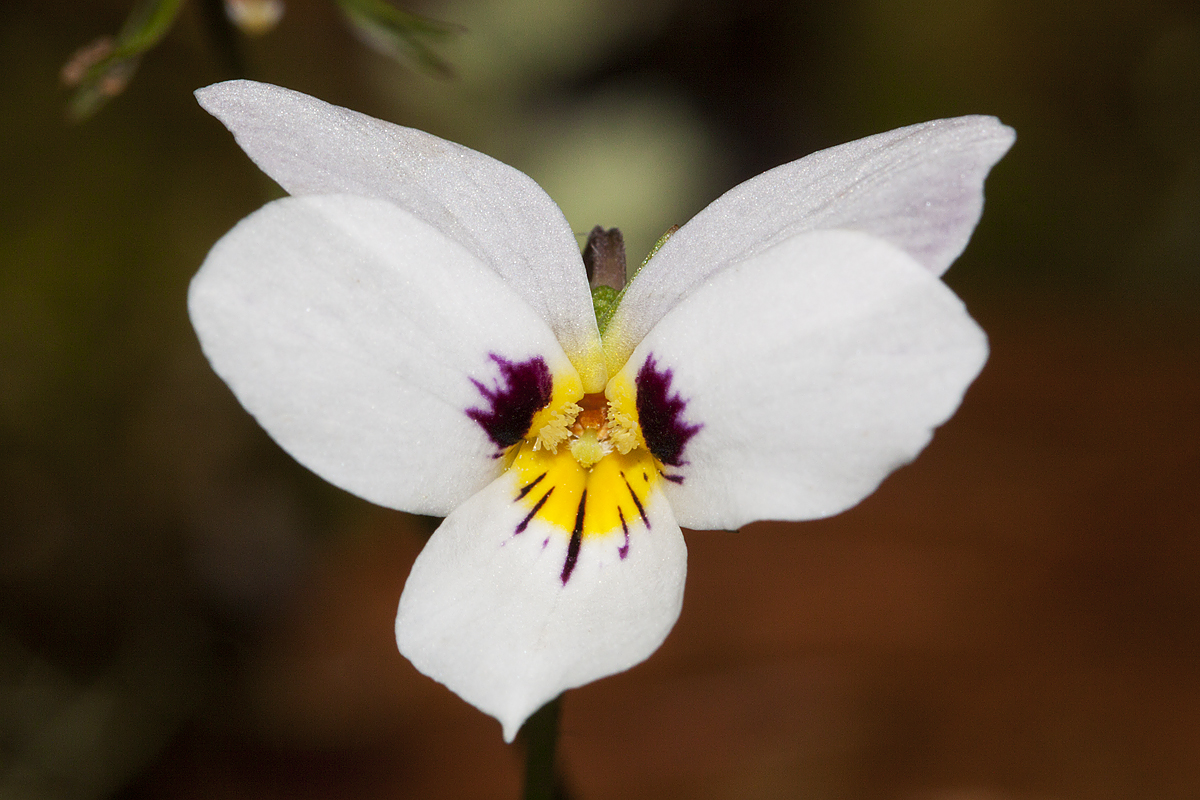
Viola ocellata

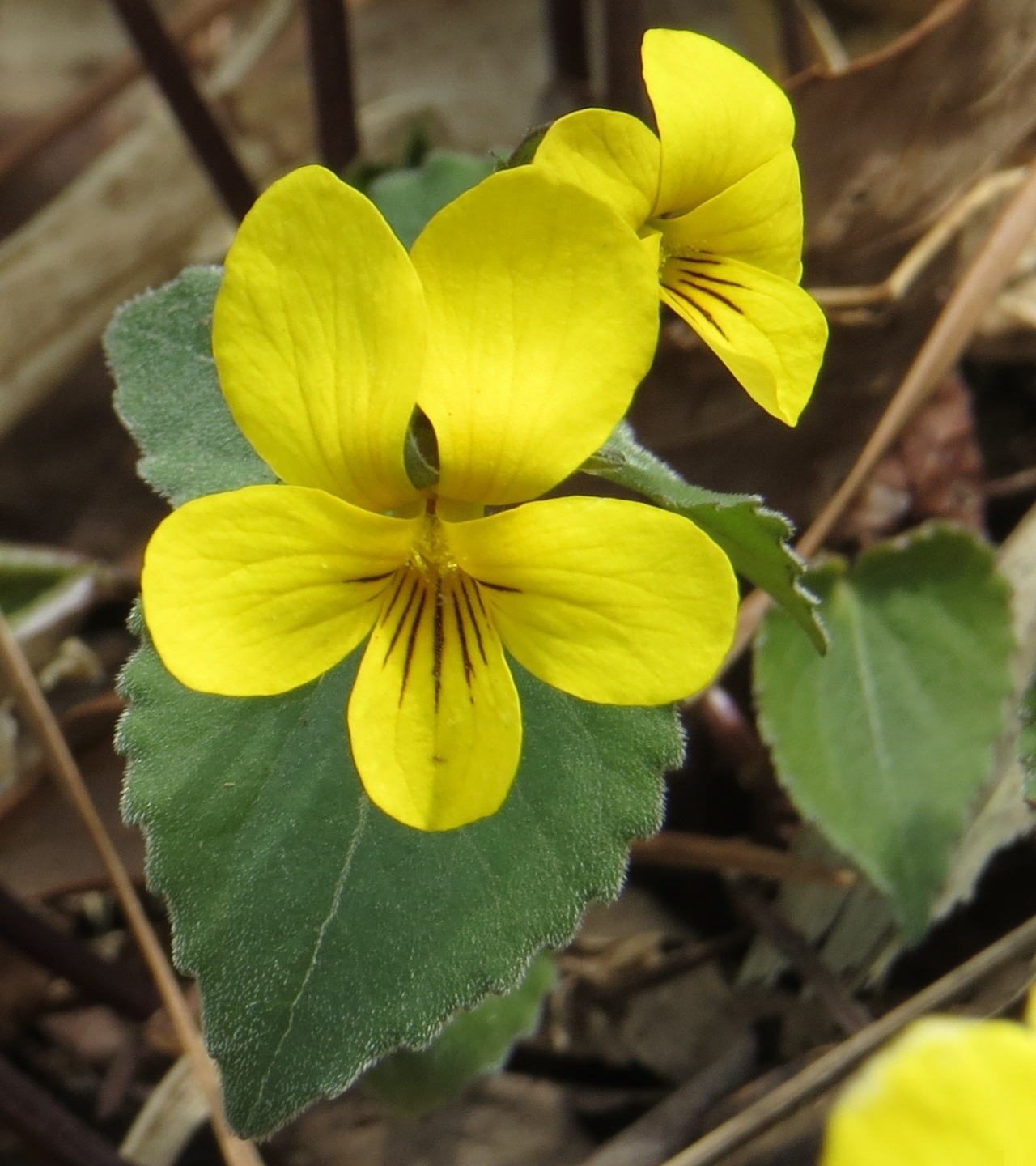
Viola orientalis

- Viola oahuensis C.N.Forbes – Oahu violet
- Viola obituaria J.M.Watson & A.R.Flores
- Viola oblonga Blatt.
- Viola obtusa (Makino) Makino – blunt violet
- Viola × obtusoacuminata T.Hashim. ex T.Shimizu
- Viola × obtusogrypoceras Makino
- Viola occulta Lehm.
- Viola ocellata Torr. & A.Gray – pinto violet, two-eyed violet
- Viola odontocalycina Boiss.
- Viola odorata L. – sweet violet
- Viola × ogawae Nakai
- Viola × okuharae F.Maek. ex T.Shimizu
- Viola × olimpia Beggiat.
- Viola orbelica Pančić
- Viola orbiculata (A.Gray) Geyer ex B.D.Jacks. – darkwoods violet, western round-leaved violet
- Viola oreades M.Bieb.
- Viola orientalis (Maxim.) W.Becker
- Viola ornata P.Gonzáles, Montesinos & J.M.Watson
- Viola orphanidis Boiss.
- Viola orthoceras Ledeb.
- Viola ovalleana Phil.
- Viola ovato-oblonga (Miq.) Makino
- Viola oxyodontis H.E.Ballard

== P ==
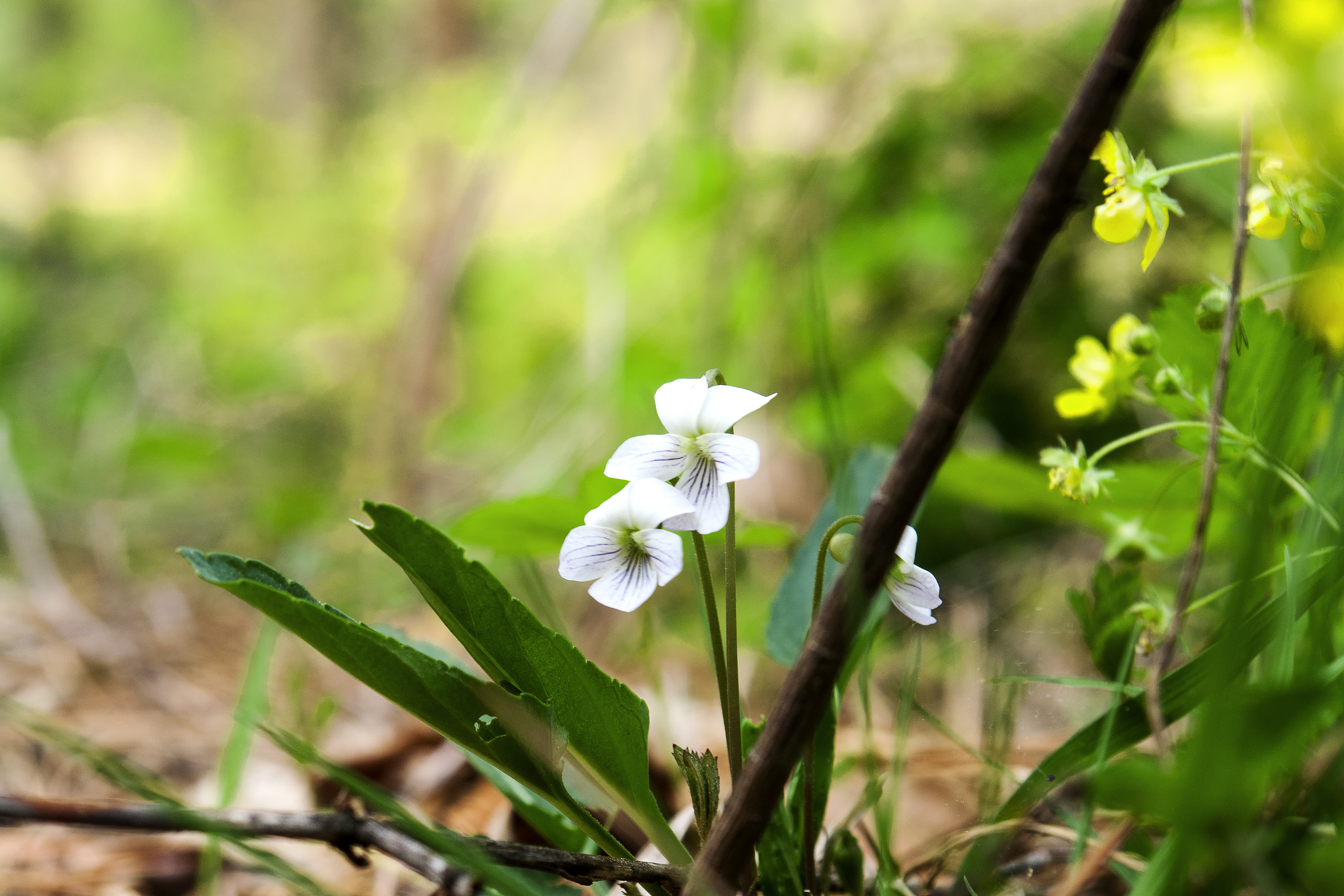
Viola patrinii

- Viola pachyrrhiza Boiss. & Hohen.
- Viola pachysoma M.Sheader & J.M.Watson
- Viola pacifica Juz.
- Viola painteri Rose & House
- Viola palatina Y.N.Lee
- Viola pallascaensis W.Becker
- Viola palmata L. – crowfoot violet, early blue violet, palmate violet (edible leaves and flowers)
- Viola palmensis (Webb & Berthel.) Sauer
- Viola palustris L. – marsh violet, alpine marsh violet
- Viola papuana W.Becker & Pulle
- Viola paradoxa Lowe
- Viola × parca House
- Viola parnonia Kit Tan, Sfikas & Vold
- Viola parvula Tineo
- Viola patrinii Ging. – stemless violet
- Viola × peckiana House – Peck's violet
- Viola pectinata E.P.Bicknell
- Viola pedata L. – birdfoot violet, crowfoot violet
- Viola pedatifida G.Don – prairie violet, prairie birdfoot violet
- Viola pedunculata Torr. & A.Gray – California golden violet, grass pansy, yellow pansy
- Viola pekinensis (Regel) W.Becker
- Viola pendulicarpa W.Becker
- Viola pentadactyla Fenzl
- Viola perinensis W.Becker
- Viola × perplexa Gremli
- Viola perpusilla Boissieu
- Viola perreniformis (L.G.Adams) R.J.Little & Leiper
- Viola petraea W.Becker
- Viola phalacrocarpa Maxim.
- Viola philippiana Greene
- Viola philippica Cav.
- Viola phitosiana Erben
- Viola pilosa Blume
- Viola pilushanensis S.S.Ying
- Viola pinetorum Greene – goosefoot violet
- Viola pinnata L. – pinnate violet
- Viola pitouchaoensis S.S.Ying
- Viola placida W.Becker
- Viola × pluricaulis Borbás
- Viola pluviae Marcussen, H.E.Ballard & Blaxland
- Viola × poelliana Murr
- Viola poetica Boiss. & Spruner
- Viola polycephala H.E.Ballard & P.M.Jørg.
- Viola polypoda Turcz.
- Viola × polysecta Nakai
- Viola × popovae Vl.V.Nikitin
- Viola × populifolia Greene
- Viola × porphyrea R.Uechtr.
- Viola portalesia Gay
- Viola × porteriana Pollard – Porter's violet
- Viola portulacea Leyb.
- Viola praemorsa Douglas – canary violet
- Viola pratincola Greene
- Viola primulifolia L. – primrose-leaf violet
- Viola principis Boissieu
- Viola prionantha Bunge
- Viola producta W.Becker
- Viola pseudaetolica Tomović, Melovski & Niketić
- Viola pseudograeca Erben
- Viola × pseudomakinoi M.Mizush. ex T.Shimizu
- Viola pubescens Aiton – downy yellow violet
- Viola pubipetala S.S.Ying
- Viola pulvinata Reiche
- Viola pumila Chaix – meadow violet
- Viola purpurea Kellogg – goosefoot violet
- Viola pusilla Poepp.
- Viola pusillima Wedd.
- Viola pygmaea Juss. ex Poir.
- Viola × pynzarii Vl.V.Nikitin
- Viola pyrenaica Ramond ex DC.

== Q ==
- Viola quercetorum M.S.Baker & J.C.Clausen

== R ==
- Viola raddeana Regel
- Viola rafinesquei Greene – field pansy
- Viola ramiflora K.O.Yoo
- Viola ramosiana W.Becker
- Viola rauliniana Erben
- Viola × raunsiensis W.Becker & Košanin
- Viola rausii Erben
- Viola × ravida House
- Viola × redacta House
- Viola regina J.M.Watson & A.R.Flores
- Viola reichei Skottsb. ex Macloskie – Reiche violet, Patagonian yellow violet, Chilean yellow violet
- Viola reichenbachiana Jord. ex Boreau – early dog violet, slender wood violet
- Viola renifolia A.Gray – northern white violet, kidney-leaved white violet
- Viola replicata W.Becker
- Viola × reschetnikovae Vl.V.Nikitin
- Viola retusa Greene
- Viola rheophila Okamoto
- Viola rhodopeia W.Becker
- Viola rhombifolia Leyb.
- Viola × ritschliana W.Becker
- Viola riviniana Rchb. – common dog violet
- Viola × robinsoniana House
- Viola roccabrunensis Espeut
- Viola rodriguezii W.Becker
- Viola roigii Rossow
- Viola rosacea Brainerd
- Viola rossii Hemsl.
- Viola rossowiana J.M.Watson & A.R.Flores
- Viola rostrata Muhl. ex Pursh – longspur violet
- Viola rosulata Poepp. & Endl.
- Viola rotundifolia Michx. – eastern roundleaf yellow violet, early yellow violet
- Viola rubella Cav.
- Viola rubromarginata J.M.Watson & A.R.Flores
- Viola rudolfii Vl.V.Nikitin
- Viola rudolphii Sparre
- Viola rugosa Phil. ex W.Becker
- Viola rugulosa Greene
- Viola × rupestriformis Vl.V.Nikitin
- Viola rupestris F.W.Schmidt – Teesdale violet, rock violet
- Viola rupicola Elmer
- Viola × ryoniae House – Ryon's violet

== S ==
- Viola saccata Melch.
- Viola sacchalinensis H.Boissieu
- Viola sacculus Skottsb.
- Viola sagittata Aiton – arrowleaf violet
- Viola samothracica (Degen) Raus
- Viola sandaiojiaoensis S.S.Ying
- Viola sandrasea Melch.
- Viola santiagonensis W.Becker
- Viola × savatieri Makino
- Viola saxifraga Maire
- Viola × scabra F.Braun
- Viola scandens Humb. & Bonpl. ex Schult.
- Viola schachimardanica Khalk.
- Viola schariensis Erben – Šar mountain violet
- Viola × schauloi Vl.V.Nikitin
- Viola scopulorum (A.Gray) Greene
- Viola scorpiuroides Coss.
- Viola seleriana W.Becker
- Viola selkirkii Pursh ex Goldie – northern violet, Selkirk's violet
- Viola sempervirens Greene – evergreen violet, redwood violet
- Viola sempervivum Gay
- Viola × semseyana Borbás
- Viola senzanensis Hayata
- Viola septemloba Leconte – southern coastal violet
- Viola septentrionalis Greene – northern woodland violet, northern blue violet
- Viola sequeirae Capelo, R.Jardim, J.C.Costa, Lousã & Rivas Mart.
- Viola × sermenika Formánek
- Viola serpentinicola de Salas
- Viola serresiana Erben
- Viola sfikasiana Erben
- Viola shaoyoukengensis S.S.Ying
- Viola sheltonii Torr. – Shelton's violet
- Viola shikokiana Makino
- Viola shinchikuensis Yamam.
- Viola shiweii Xiao C.Li & Zheng W.Wang
- Viola sieberiana Spreng.
- Viola sieboldii Maxim.
- Viola sieheana W.Becker
- Viola sikkimensis W.Becker
- Viola silicestris K.R.Thiele & Prober
- Viola singularis J.M.Watson & A.R.Flores
- Viola sintenisii W.Becker
- Viola sirinica Ricceri & Moraldo
- Viola × skofitziana Wiesb.
- Viola skottsbergiana W.Becker
- Viola × slavinii House – Slavin's violet
- Viola somchetica K.Koch
- Viola sororia Willd. – woolly blue violet
- Viola spathulata Willd. ex Schult.
- Viola speciosa Pant.
- Viola spegazzinii W.Becker
- Viola sphaerocarpa W.Becker
- Viola stagnina Kit. ex Schult.
- Viola steinbachii W.Becker
- Viola stewardiana W.Becker
- Viola stipularis Sw.
- Viola stocksii Boiss.
- Viola stojanowii W.Becker
- Viola stoloniflora Yokota & Higa
- Viola stoneana House
- Viola striata Aiton – striped violet, striped cream violet, pale violet
- Viola striatella H.Boissieu
- Viola striis-notata (J.Wagner) Merxm. & W.Lippert
- Viola stuebelii Hieron.
- Viola suavis M.Bieb. – Russian violet
- Viola subandina J.M.Watson
- Viola subasica (Fiori) Ricceri & Moraldo
- Viola subatlantica (Maire) Ibn Tattou
- Viola subdimidiata A.St.-Hil.
- Viola × sublanceolata House
- Viola subsinuata (Greene) Greene – wavy-leaf violet
- Viola suecica Fr.
- Viola × sukaczewii Vl.V.Nikitin
- Viola sumatrana Miq.
- Viola szetschwanensis W.Becker & H.Boissieu

== T ==
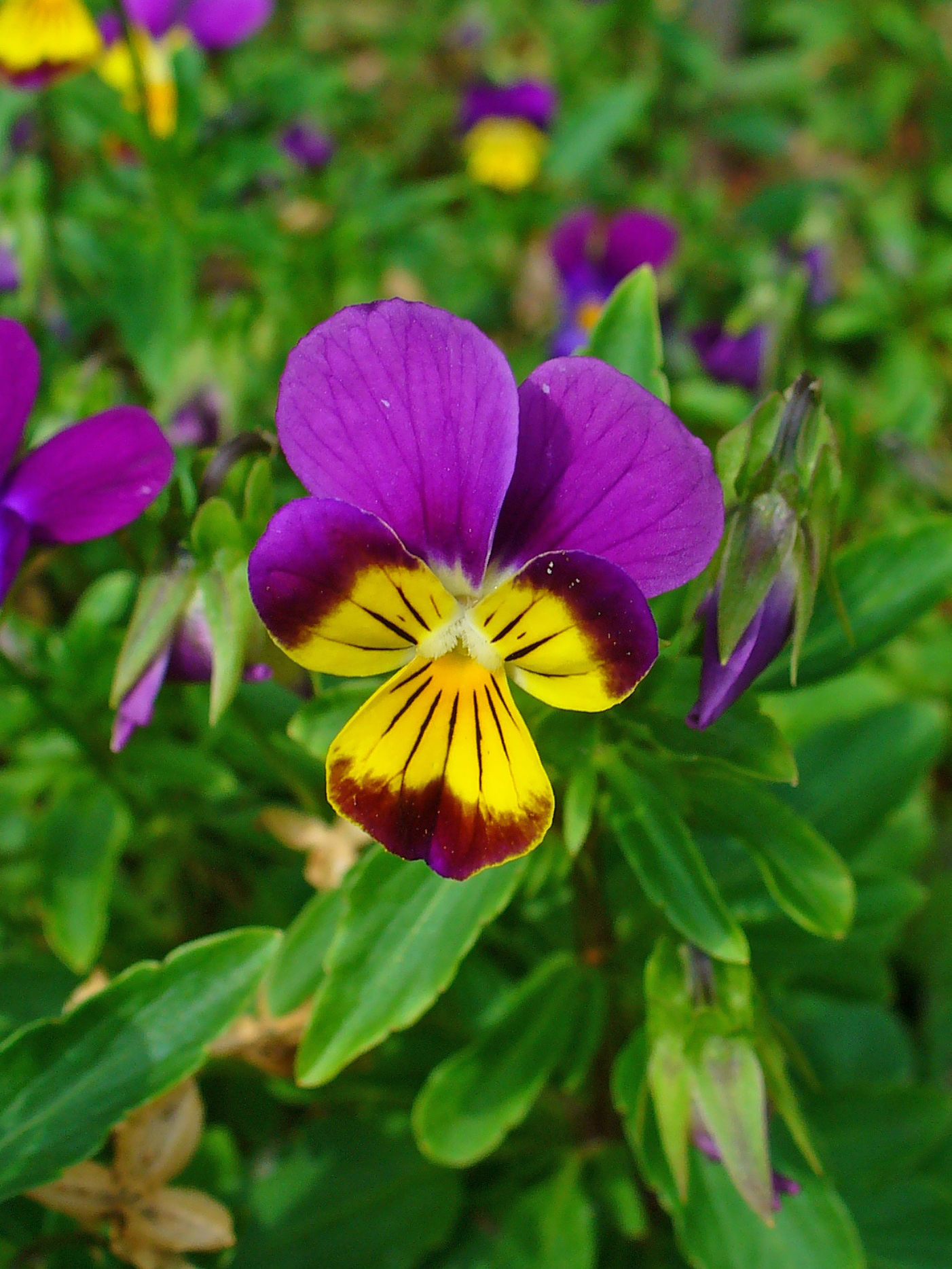
Viola tricolor

- Viola taltalensis W.Becker
- Viola tanaitica Grosset
- Viola × taradakensis Nakai
- Viola tarbagataica Klokov
- Viola tashiroi Makino
- Viola tatjanae Stepanov
- Viola tectiflora W.Becker
- Viola tenuipes Pollard
- Viola tenuissima C.C.Chang
- Viola teplouchovii Juz.
- Viola teshioensis Miyabe & Tatew.
- Viola thasia W.Becker
- Viola thianschanica Maxim.
- Viola thibaudieri Franch. & Sav.
- Viola thomasiana Songeon & E.P.Perrier
- Viola thomsonii Oudem.
- Viola thymifolia Britton
- Viola tienschiensis W.Becker
- Viola × tigirekica Vl.V.Nikitin
- Viola tineorum Erben & Raimondo
- Viola tokubuchiana Makino
- Viola tomentosa M.S.Baker & J.C.Clausen – feltleaf violet
- Viola × torslundensis W.Becker
- Viola tovarii P.Gonzáles & Molina-Alor
- Viola triangulifolia W.Becker
- Viola trichopetala C.C.Chang
- Viola trichosepala (W.Becker) Juz.
- Viola tricolor L. – wild pansy, heart's-ease, Johnny-jump-up
- Viola tridentata Sm.
- Viola triflabellata W.Becker
- Viola trinervata (Howell) Howell ex A.Gray – Rainier violet, sagebrush violet
- Viola tripartita Elliott – threepart violet
- Viola trochlearis J.M.Watson & A.R.Flores
- Viola truncata Meyen
- Viola tucumanensis W.Becker
- Viola turkestanica Regel & Schmalh.
- Viola turritella J.M.Watson & A.R.Flores
- Viola × tuvinica Vl.V.Nikitin
- Viola × tzvelevii Vl.V.Nikitin

== U ==
- Viola ucriana Erben & Raimondo
- Viola × uechtritziana Borbás
- Viola uliginosa Besser – swamp violet
- Viola umbraticola Kunth – Ponderosa violet
- Viola umphangensis S.Nansai, Srisanga & Suwanph.
- Viola uniflora L.
- Viola uniquissima J.M.Watson & A.R.Flores
- Viola unwinii W.Becker
- Viola urophylla Franch.
- Viola utahensis M.S.Baker & J.C.Clausen – Utah violet
- Viola utchinensis Koidz.

== V ==
- Viola vadimii Vl.V.Nikitin
- Viola vaginata Maxim. – sheathed violet
- Viola valderia All.
- Viola vallenarensis W.Becker
- Viola vallicola A.Nelson – valley violet
- Viola vanroyenii H.St.John
- Viola variegata Fisch. ex Link
- Viola vectoris Ricceri & Moraldo
- Viola velutina Formánek
- Viola × venustula Greene
- Viola × vermontana House
- Viola veronicifolia Planch. & Linden
- Viola viarum Pollard – twoflower violet, plains violet, wayside violet
- Viola × viatkensis Vl.V.Nikitin
- Viola × villaquensis Benz
- Viola villosa Walter – Carolina violet, hairy violet, wrinkled violet
- Viola × vilnaensis W.Becker
- Viola × vindobonensis Wiesb.
- Viola violacea Makino
- Viola vittata Greene
- Viola volcanica Gillies ex Hook. & Arn.
- Viola voliotisii Erben
- Viola vorobievii Bezd.
- Viola vourinensis Erben
- Viola vulturis Ricceri & Moraldo

== W ==
- Viola wailenalenae (Rock) Skottsb. – Alakai swamp violet
- Viola wallichiana Ging.
- Viola walteri House – prostrate blue violet, prostrate southern violet
- Viola wansanensis Y.N.Lee
- Viola weberbaueri W.Becker
- Viola websteri Hemsl.
- Viola weibelii J.F.Macbr.
- Viola × wilczekiana Beauverd
- Viola × wilhelmii Vl.V.Nikitin
- Viola × wilibaldii Vl.V.Nikitin
- Viola willkommii R.Roem. ex Willk.
- Viola woosanensis Y.N.Lee & J.Kim
- Viola woroschilovii Bezd.
- Viola × wujekii H.E.Ballard
- Viola wulinfarmensis S.S.Ying
- Viola wulingensis S.S.Ying

== X ==
- Viola xanthopotamica J.M.Watson & A.R.Flores
- Viola xibaoensis S.S.Ying

== Y ==
- Viola yazawana Makino
- Viola yezoensis Maxim.
- Viola yildirimlii Dinç & Bağcı
- Viola yunnanensis W.Becker & H.Boissieu
- Viola yunnanfuensis W.Becker
- Viola × yurii Vl.V.Nikitin
- Viola yuzufelensis A.P.Khokhr.

== Z ==
- Viola × zophodes K.R.Thiele & Prober
- Viola × zwienenii J.M.Watson & A.R.Flores
