= V. hastata =

V. hastata may refer to:

- Verbena hastata, the blue vervain or swamp verbena, a flowering plant species
- Verbesina hastata, a flowering plant species in the genus Verbesina
- Viola hastata, the halberd-leaf yellow violet, a flowering plant species in the genus Viola

== See also ==
- Hastata (disambiguation)
