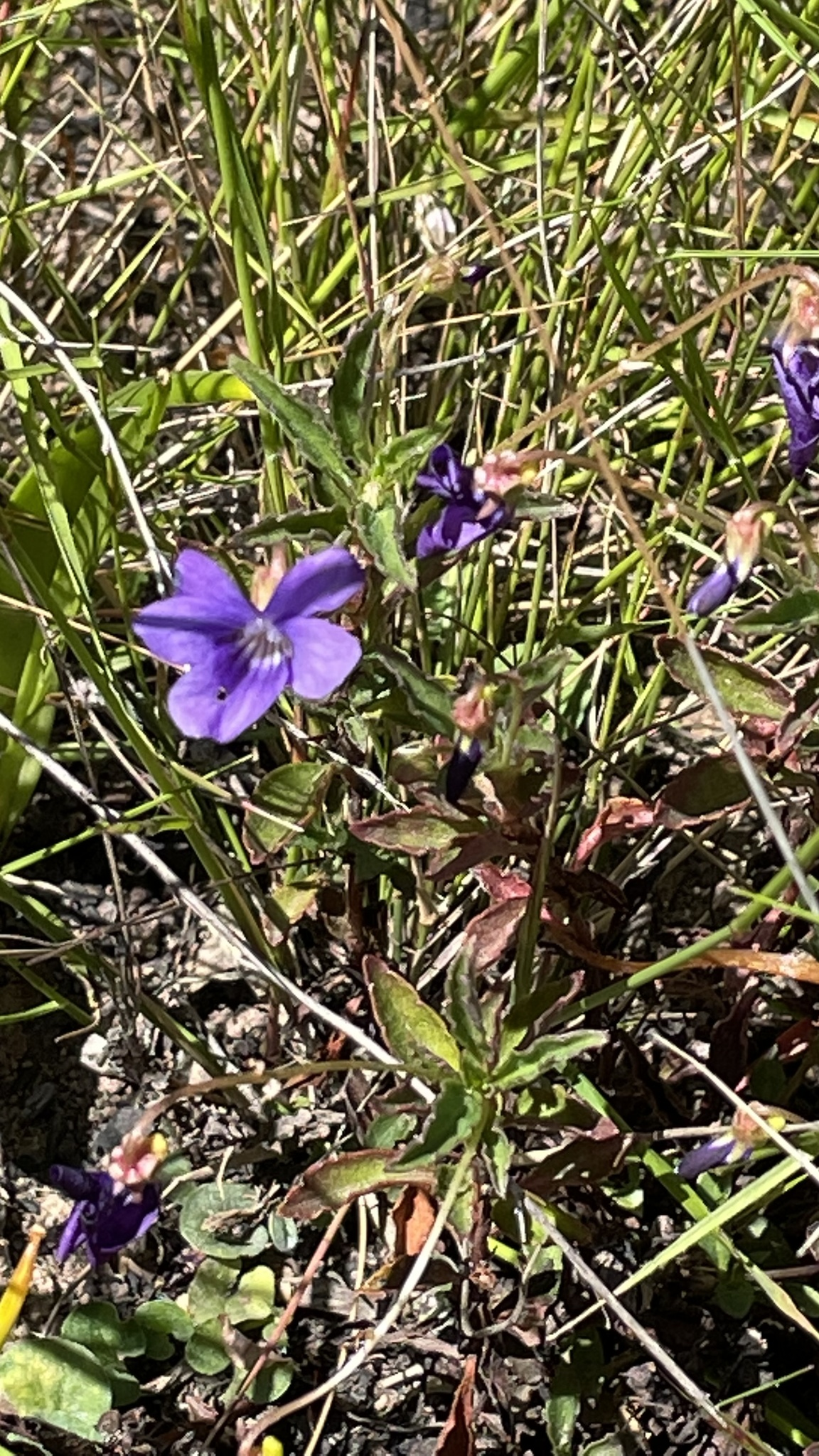

Scientific classification
- Kingdom: Plantae
- Clade: Tracheophytes
- Clade: Angiosperms
- Clade: Eudicots
- Clade: Rosids
- Order: Malpighiales
- Family: Violaceae
- Genus: Viola
- Species: V. portalesia

Binomial name
- Viola portalesia Gay.

= Viola portalesia =

Species of plant

Viola portalesia is a species of flowering plant in the family Violaceae. It is endemic to Chile.
