= Viola silicestris =

Scientific classification
- Kingdom: Plantae
- Clade: Embryophytes
- Clade: Tracheophytes
- Clade: Angiosperms
- Clade: Eudicots
- Clade: Rosids
- Order: Malpighiales
- Family: Violaceae
- Genus: Viola
- Species: V. silicestris

Binomial name
- Viola silicestris K.R.Thiele & Prober

Species of flowering plant

Viola silicestris, commonly known as sandstone violet, is a perennial herb of the genus Viola native to southeastern Australia. It is described by Kevin Thiele & Suzanne Prober in the journal Telopea in 2006
