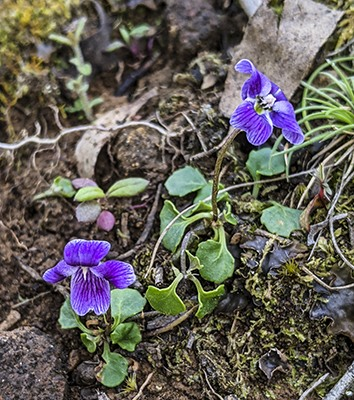
- Viola fuscoviolacea

Scientific classification
- Kingdom: Plantae
- Clade: Embryophytes
- Clade: Tracheophytes
- Clade: Spermatophytes
- Clade: Angiosperms
- Clade: Eudicots
- Clade: Rosids
- Order: Malpighiales
- Family: Violaceae
- Genus: Viola
- Species: V. fuscoviolacea

Binomial name
- Viola fuscoviolacea (L.G.Adams) T.A.James

= Viola fuscoviolacea =

Dusky violet

Species of flowering plant

Viola fuscoviolacea, commonly known as the dusky violet, is a species of perennial herb in the family Violaceae. It is native to southeastern Australia, including Tasmania, where it occurs primarily in damp alpine and subalpine habitats.

The species was originally described as Viola hederacea subsp. fuscoviolacea by L. G. Adams but was later elevated to species rank by T. A. James following taxonomic revision of the Viola hederacea species complex.

== Description ==
Viola fuscoviolacea is a small stoloniferous herb that forms compact rosettes close to the ground, typically growing 2–5 cm tall and spreading via short stolons. Leaves are tufted at the base with red-brown, free stipules that are 1–2 mm long, linear-lanceolate, and deeply laciniate. Petioles are 8–20 mm long. The leaf blade is broadly ovate to ovate-rhomboid, approximately 3–6 mm long and 3–8 mm wide, and may occasionally bear scattered short stiff hairs. The leaf base is cuneate to truncate, the apex obtuse, and the margins shallowly crenate with incurved gland-tipped teeth.

Flowering stalks (scapes) are generally shorter than the leaves and may be either glabrous or sparsely covered with short stiff spreading hairs. Small bracteoles occur below the middle of the scape. Sepals are lanceolate, measuring 1.5–2 mm long, with short basal spurs. The petals are dark violet in bud, 2–4 mm long, and often become paler as the flower matures. The lower petal lacks a spur, while the lateral petals are bearded, sometimes sparsely.

The fruit is a capsule approximately 4–6 mm long. Flowering and fruiting occur between October and March.

== Taxonomy ==
Viola fuscoviolacea belongs to the family Violaceae, a group consisting mostly of small herbaceous plants distributed widely throughout temperate regions. The genus Viola contains several hundred species worldwide and is represented in Australia by approximately 22 native species, many of which occur in moist habitats.

The species was originally described as Viola hederacea subsp. fuscoviolacea by L.G. Adams as part of the Viola hederacea species complex. It was later elevated to species rank as Viola fuscoviolacea (L.G.Adams) T.A. James following taxonomic revision of the complex. This revision recognised several Australian violets that had previously been treated as subspecies but were considered sufficiently distinct to be recognised as separate species.

The specific name fuscoviolacea refers to the dark violet colouring of the flowers, from which the common name "dusky violet" is derived.

== Distribution and habitat ==
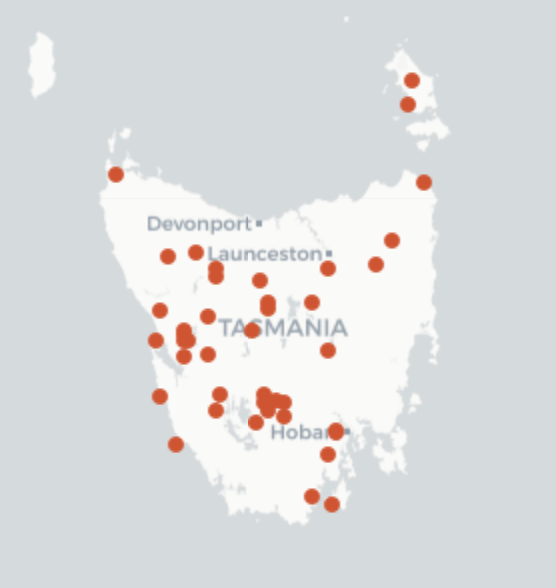
Distribution of Viola fuscoviolacea in Tasmania

Viola fuscoviolacea is native to southeastern Australia, including Tasmania, where it primarily occurs within the Central Plateau and other highland regions of the state. The species generally occurs at elevations above approximately 900 m (3,000 ft), although it may occasionally occur in lower subalpine environments.

It is typically found in alpine herbfields, heathlands and open montane vegetation, growing in well-drained soils under cool and exposed conditions. Surrounding vegetation is characterised by low-growing shrubs, grasses and herbs adapted to high precipitation, strong winds and seasonal snow cover typical of Tasmanian alpine environments.

== Ecology ==
Alpine ecosystems of Tasmania are characterised by low temperatures, short growing seasons, nutrient-poor soils and exposure to wind and frost, all of which strongly influence plant community structure.

Within these ecosystems, Viola fuscoviolacea occurs as a low-growing perennial herb within alpine herbfield communities, where open vegetation and reduced competition allow small herbaceous species to persist. Like many alpine species, it exhibits adaptations suited to these conditions, including a compact growth form and perennial life cycle that enable survival in Tasmania's high-elevation environments.
