= Viola calcicola =

Scientific classification
- Kingdom: Plantae
- Clade: Tracheophytes
- Clade: Angiosperms
- Clade: Eudicots
- Clade: Rosids
- Order: Malpighiales
- Family: Violaceae
- Genus: Viola
- Species: V. calcicola

Binomial name
- Viola calcicola R.A.McCauley & H.E.Ballard

Species of plant

Viola calcicola, the limestone violet, is a species of flowering plant in the family Violaceae, native to Texas. A perennial reaching 10 cm (4 in), it has white flowers with purple markings.
