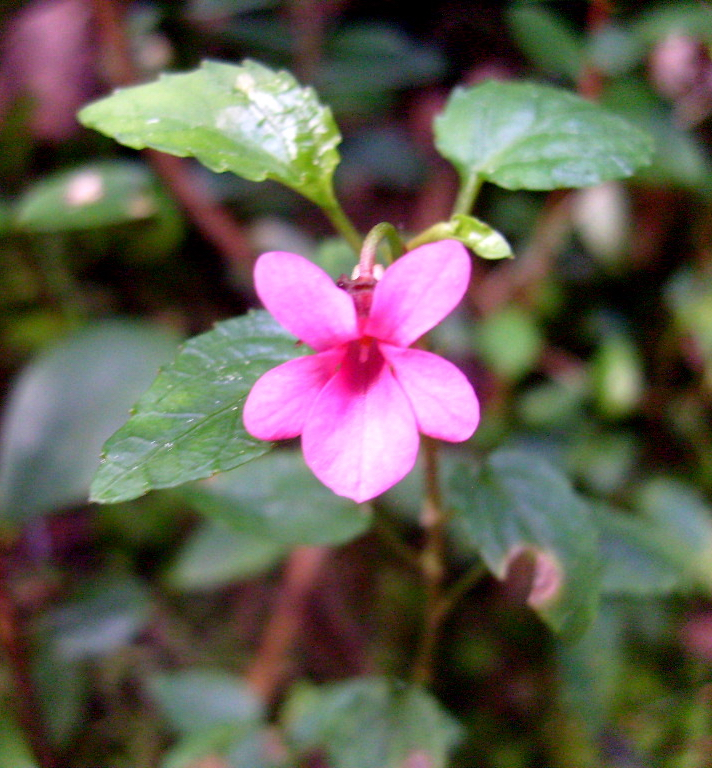

Scientific classification
- Kingdom: Plantae
- Clade: Tracheophytes
- Clade: Angiosperms
- Clade: Eudicots
- Clade: Rosids
- Order: Malpighiales
- Family: Violaceae
- Genus: Viola
- Species: V. rubella

Binomial name
- Viola rubella Cav.

= Viola rubella =

Species of plant

Viola rubella is a species of flowering plant in the family Violaceae. It is endemic to southern Chile, distributed between the Biobío and Los Lagos regions.
