= Viola sieberiana =

Scientific classification
- Kingdom: Plantae
- Clade: Tracheophytes
- Clade: Angiosperms
- Clade: Eudicots
- Clade: Rosids
- Order: Malpighiales
- Family: Violaceae
- Genus: Viola
- Species: V. sieberiana

Binomial name
- Viola sieberiana Spreng.

Species of shrub

Viola sieberiana is a perennial shrub of the genus Viola native to southeastern Australia.
