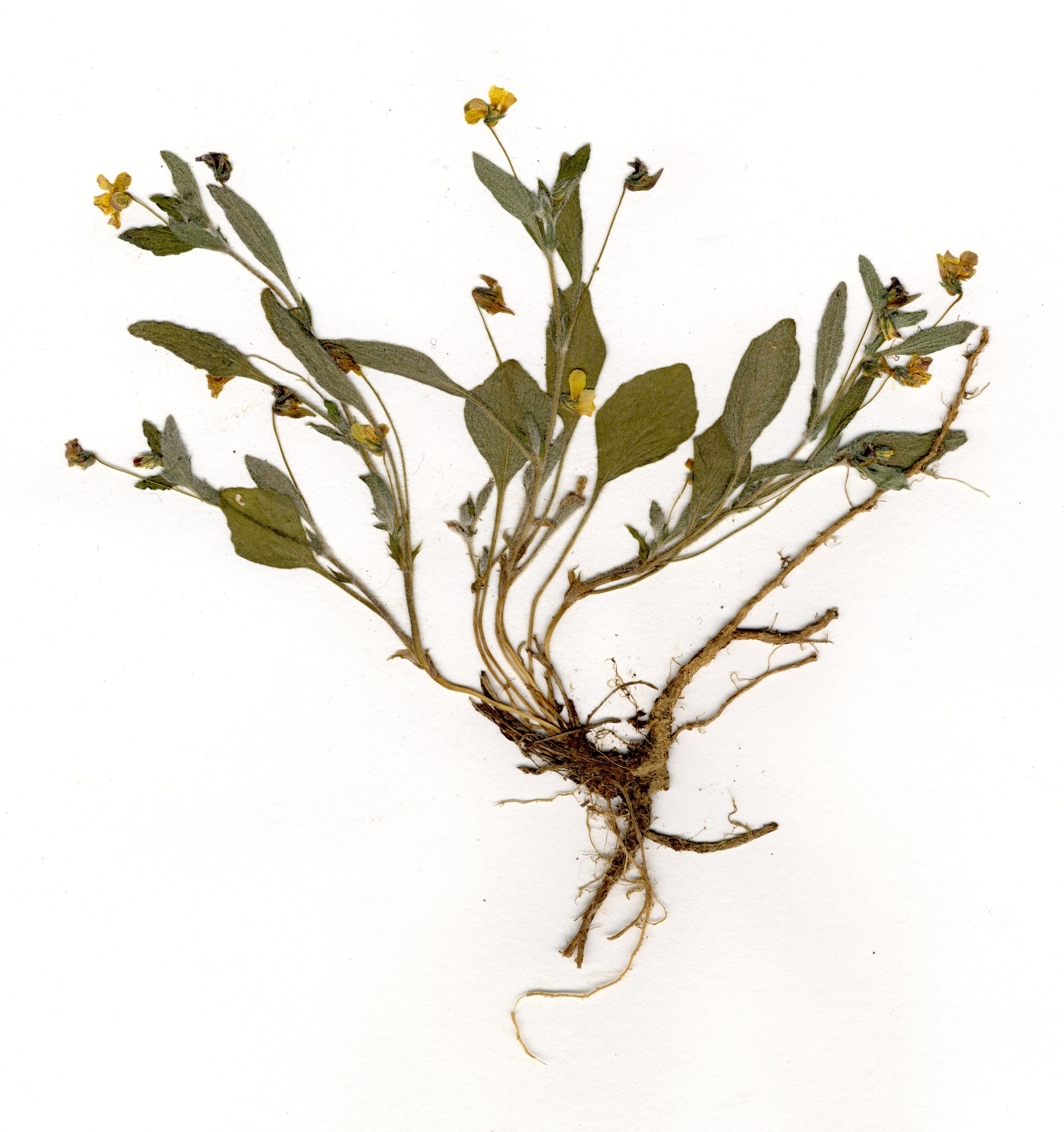

Conservation status
- Vulnerable (NatureServe)

Scientific classification
- Kingdom: Plantae
- Clade: Tracheophytes
- Clade: Angiosperms
- Clade: Eudicots
- Clade: Rosids
- Order: Malpighiales
- Family: Violaceae
- Genus: Viola
- Species: V. tomentosa

Binomial name
- Viola tomentosa M.S.Baker & J.C.Clausen

= Viola tomentosa =

Species of flowering plant

Viola tomentosa is a species of violet known by the common names feltleaf violet and woolly violet. It is endemic to the central Sierra Nevada of California, where it occurs in various types of dry mountain forest habitat. This small herb grows from a deep taproot, reaching a maximum height of 5 to 10 centimeters. The herbage is coated with woolly hairs. The leaves have oval blades borne on petioles a few centimeters long. A solitary flower is borne on a short upright stem. It is under a centimeter long with five yellow petals. The lower three petals are veined with dark brown and the upper two are stained brown or purplish on the back sides.
