= Viola eminens =

Scientific classification
- Kingdom: Plantae
- Clade: Tracheophytes
- Clade: Angiosperms
- Clade: Eudicots
- Clade: Rosids
- Order: Malpighiales
- Family: Violaceae
- Genus: Viola
- Species: V. eminens

Binomial name
- Viola eminens K.R.Thiele & Prober

Species of flowering plant

Viola eminens is a perennial, stolon-spreading herb in the genus Viola, native to southeastern Australia (South Australia, Victoria, and New South Wales).
