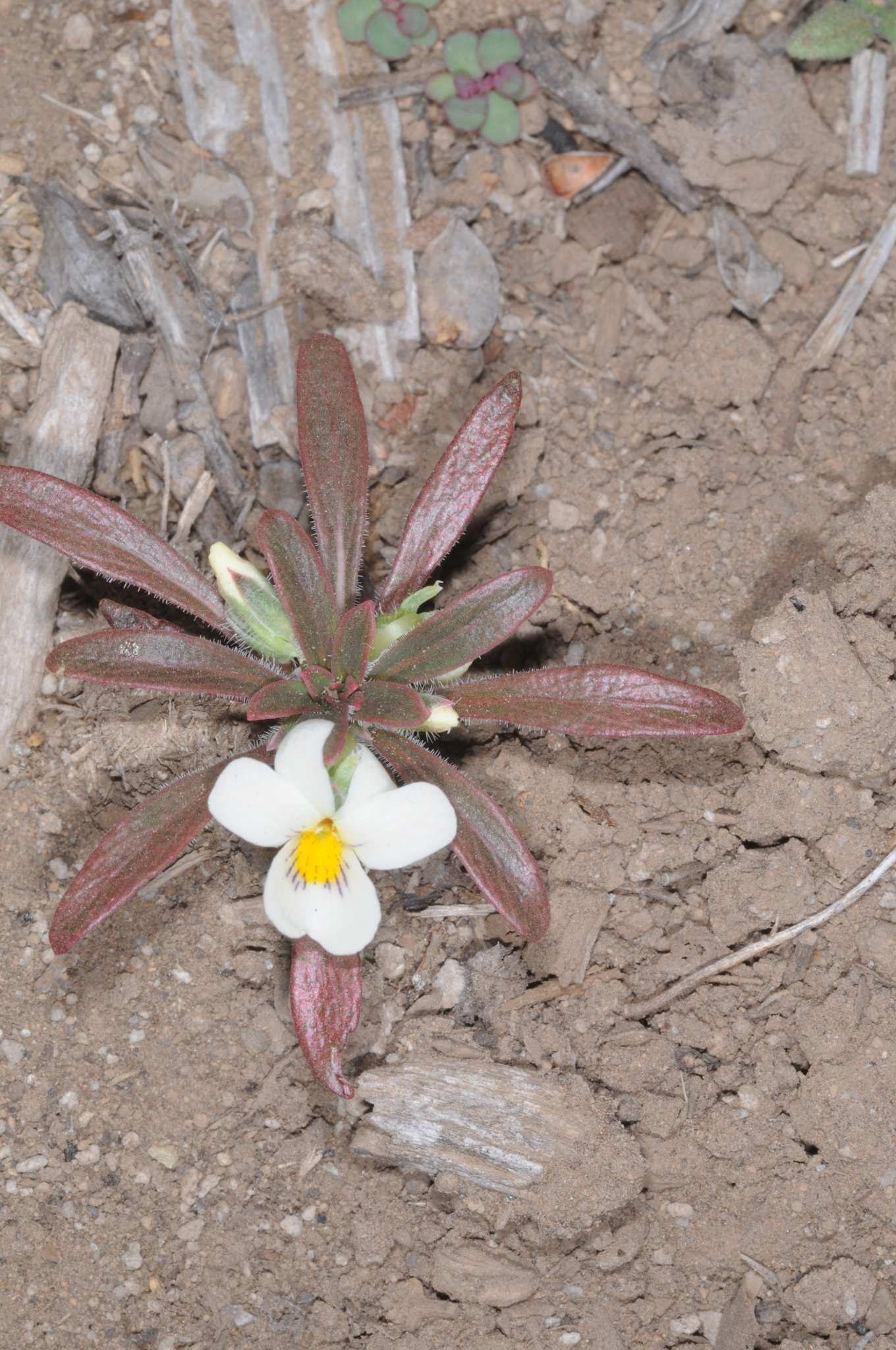

Scientific classification
- Kingdom: Plantae
- Clade: Tracheophytes
- Clade: Angiosperms
- Clade: Eudicots
- Clade: Rosids
- Order: Malpighiales
- Family: Violaceae
- Genus: Viola
- Species: V. minutiflora

Binomial name
- Viola minutiflora Phil.

= Viola minutiflora =

Species of plant

Viola minutiflora is a species of flowering plant in the family Violaceae. It is one of the around 50 species of Viola that are endemic to Chile. It is an annual herb inhabiting the Biobio and Araucanía regions.
