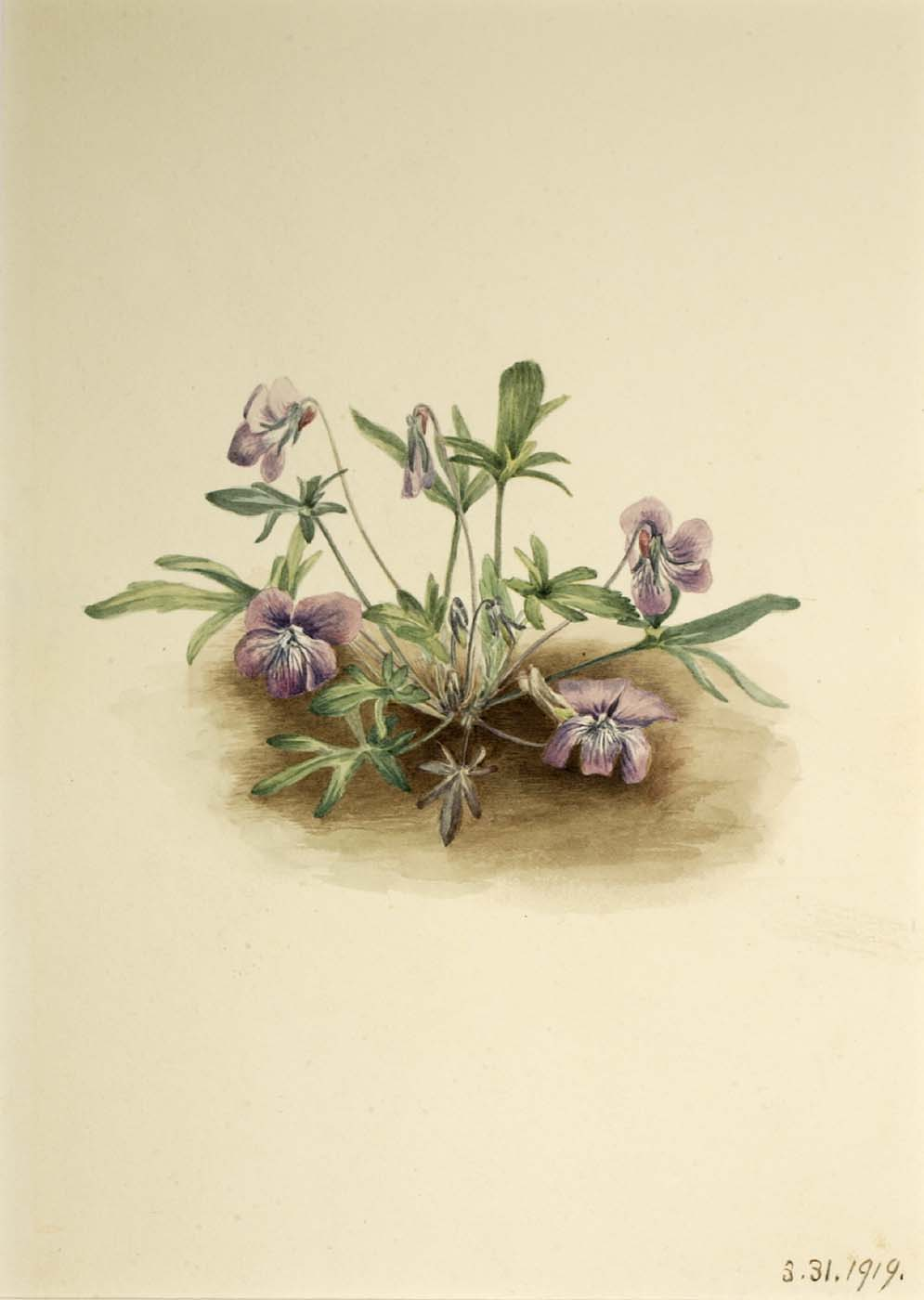
- Botanical illustration by Mary Vaux Walcott

Scientific classification
- Kingdom: Plantae
- Clade: Tracheophytes
- Clade: Angiosperms
- Clade: Eudicots
- Clade: Rosids
- Order: Malpighiales
- Family: Violaceae
- Genus: Viola
- Species: V. septemloba

Binomial name
- Viola septemloba Leconte

Synonyms
- Viola insignis Pollard; Viola vicinalis Greene

= Viola septemloba =

Species of plant

Viola septemloba, the southern coastal violet, is a species of flowering plant in the family Violaceae, native to the Atlantic Plain of the southeastern United States. A perennial reaching 30 cm (12 in), it can have violet, blue, or white flowers.

V. septemloba is most commonly found in habitat types such as pine woods, oak woodlands, and savannahs. It acts as an indicator species for silty longleaf woodlands in the Florida Panhandle.
