= Viola imbricata =

Scientific classification
- Kingdom: Plantae
- Clade: Tracheophytes
- Clade: Angiosperms
- Clade: Eudicots
- Clade: Rosids
- Order: Malpighiales
- Family: Violaceae
- Genus: Viola
- Species: V. imbricata

Binomial name
- Viola imbricata K.Menegoz & J.L.Celis-Diez

Species of plant

Viola imbricata is a species of flowering plant in the family Violaceae. It is endemic to the Andes in Central Chile. It was described in 2024. It is circumscribed within subgenus Neoandinium, which is composed by circa 140 species commonly known as Andean rosulate violas, distributed between the equator and southern Patagonia. This species is threatened by land use and climate change.

== Ecology ==
Native Hymenoptera from the genera Liphanthus and Hypodynerus were recorded visiting the flowers of Viola imbricata. Larvae of the lepidopteran Yramea lathonioides was observed feeding on the plant.
