= Viola improcera =

Scientific classification
- Kingdom: Plantae
- Clade: Tracheophytes
- Clade: Angiosperms
- Clade: Eudicots
- Clade: Rosids
- Order: Malpighiales
- Family: Violaceae
- Genus: Viola
- Species: V. improcera

Binomial name
- Viola improcera L.G.Adams

Species of plant

Viola improcera is a species of plant native to Australia. It is found in the states of Victoria, New South Wales and Tasmania.
