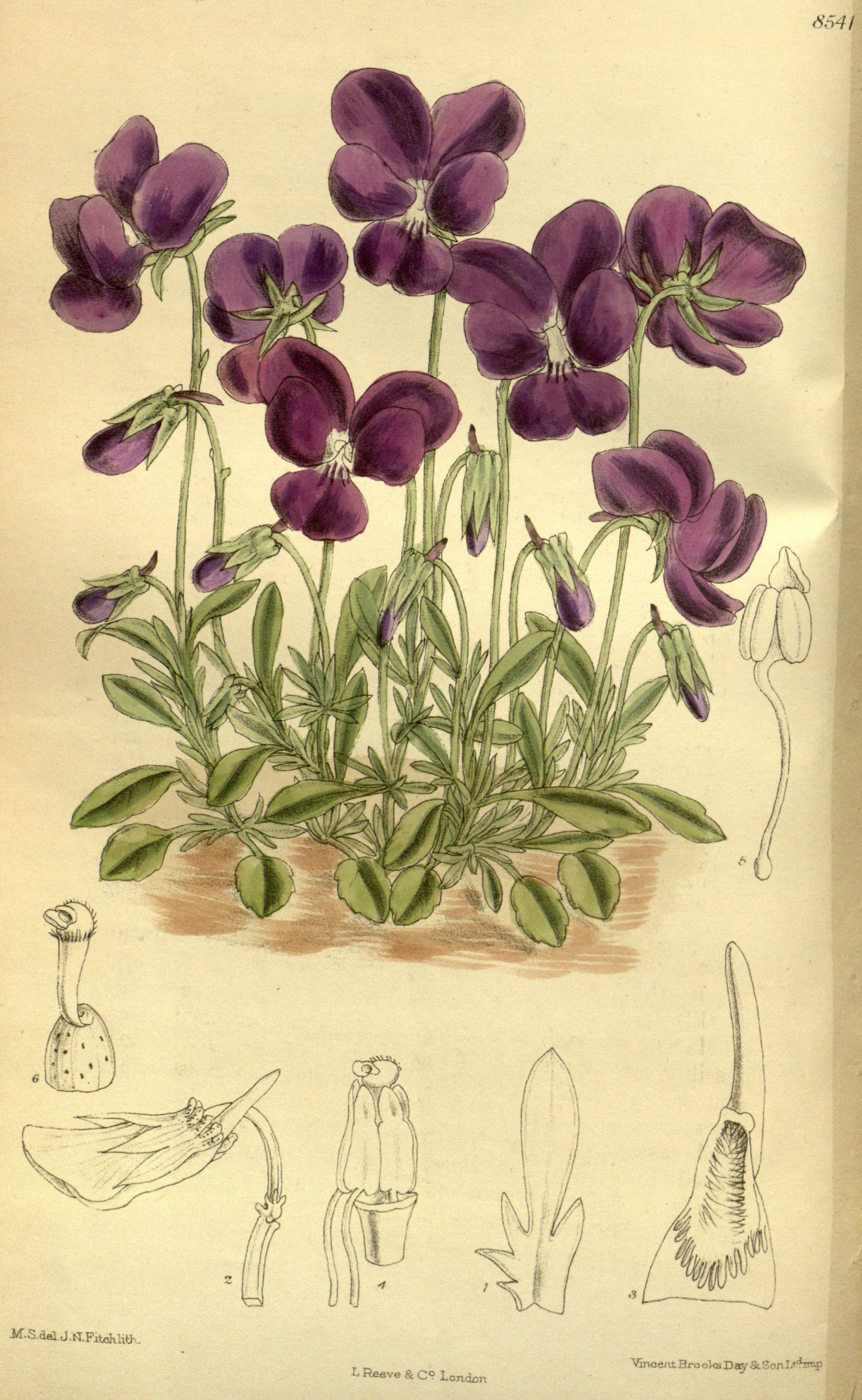

Scientific classification
- Kingdom: Plantae
- Clade: Tracheophytes
- Clade: Angiosperms
- Clade: Eudicots
- Clade: Rosids
- Order: Malpighiales
- Family: Violaceae
- Genus: Viola
- Species: V. gracilis

Binomial name
- Viola gracilis Sm.

Synonyms
- Viola calycina Boiss. & Heldr.; Viola elongata A.Huet ex Nyman; Viola olympica Boiss.

= Viola gracilis =

Species of flowering plant

Viola gracilis, also known as the Olympian violet, is a species of flowering plant within the family Violaceae.

== Description ==
Viola gracilis is a perennial species, which grows to form dense mats. Leaves are ovate to oblong and range from 2–3 cm long. Plants possess decumbent based stems, which can range from 5–30 cm long. Plants flower between May and August. Flowers can be yellow or violet in colour, but never bicoloured. The spur of the flower is 6-7mm and can be straight or slightly curved. Stipules have oblanceolate, spathulate lobes.

== Distribution ==
Viola gracilis is native to Europe where it can be found in the countries of Albania, Bulgaria, Yugoslavia and Turkey. Turkish populations are only present in western Turkey.

== Habitat ==
Viola gracilis grows in grassy mountain woodlands and alpine meadows. It can also be found growing amongst rocks. It has been recorded growing at altitudes ranging from 1250 to 2000 meters above sea level.
