= Viola culminis =

Scientific classification
- Kingdom: Plantae
- Clade: Tracheophytes
- Clade: Angiosperms
- Clade: Eudicots
- Clade: Rosids
- Order: Malpighiales
- Family: Violaceae
- Genus: Viola
- Species: V. culminis

Binomial name
- Viola culminis F. Fen. & Moraldo

Species of plant

Viola culminis is a plant in the family Violaceae, endemic to Northern Italy where it grows in Lombardy and Trentino-Alto Adige/Südtirol.
