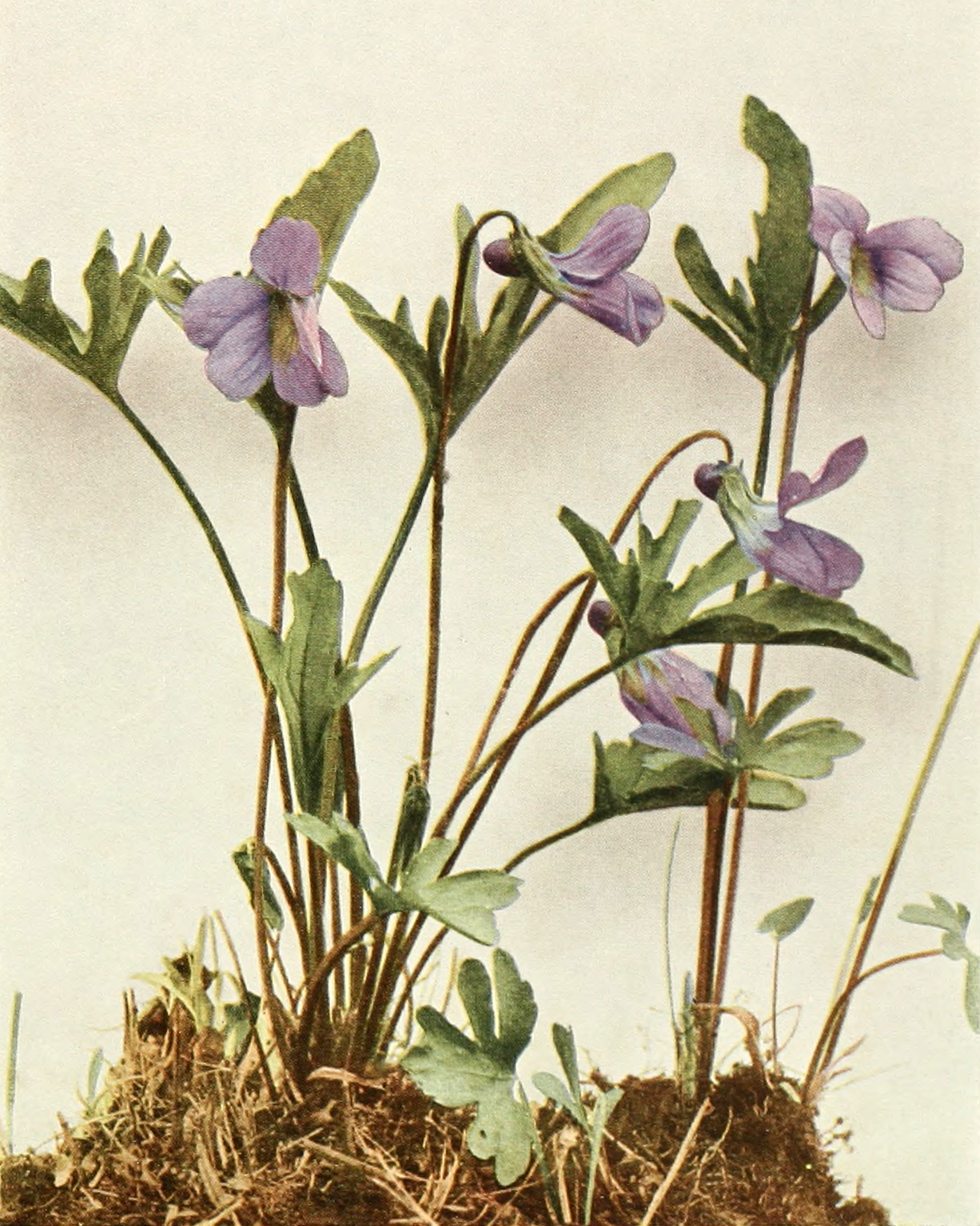

Scientific classification
- Kingdom: Plantae
- Clade: Tracheophytes
- Clade: Angiosperms
- Clade: Eudicots
- Clade: Rosids
- Order: Malpighiales
- Family: Violaceae
- Genus: Viola
- Species: V. brittoniana

Binomial name
- Viola brittoniana Pollard

Synonyms
- Viola pedatifida subsp. brittoniana

= Viola brittoniana =

Species of flowering plant

Viola brittoniana, known as coast violet, northern coastal violet and Britton's violet, is a rare, acaulescent blue-flowered violet that is endemic to the eastern United States. It has distinctive leaves with narrow lobes and deep sinuses. It is a perennial.

== Conservation status ==
It is listed as endangered in Connecticut and Pennsylvania. It is listed as threatened in Massachusetts and as possibly extirpated in Maine.
