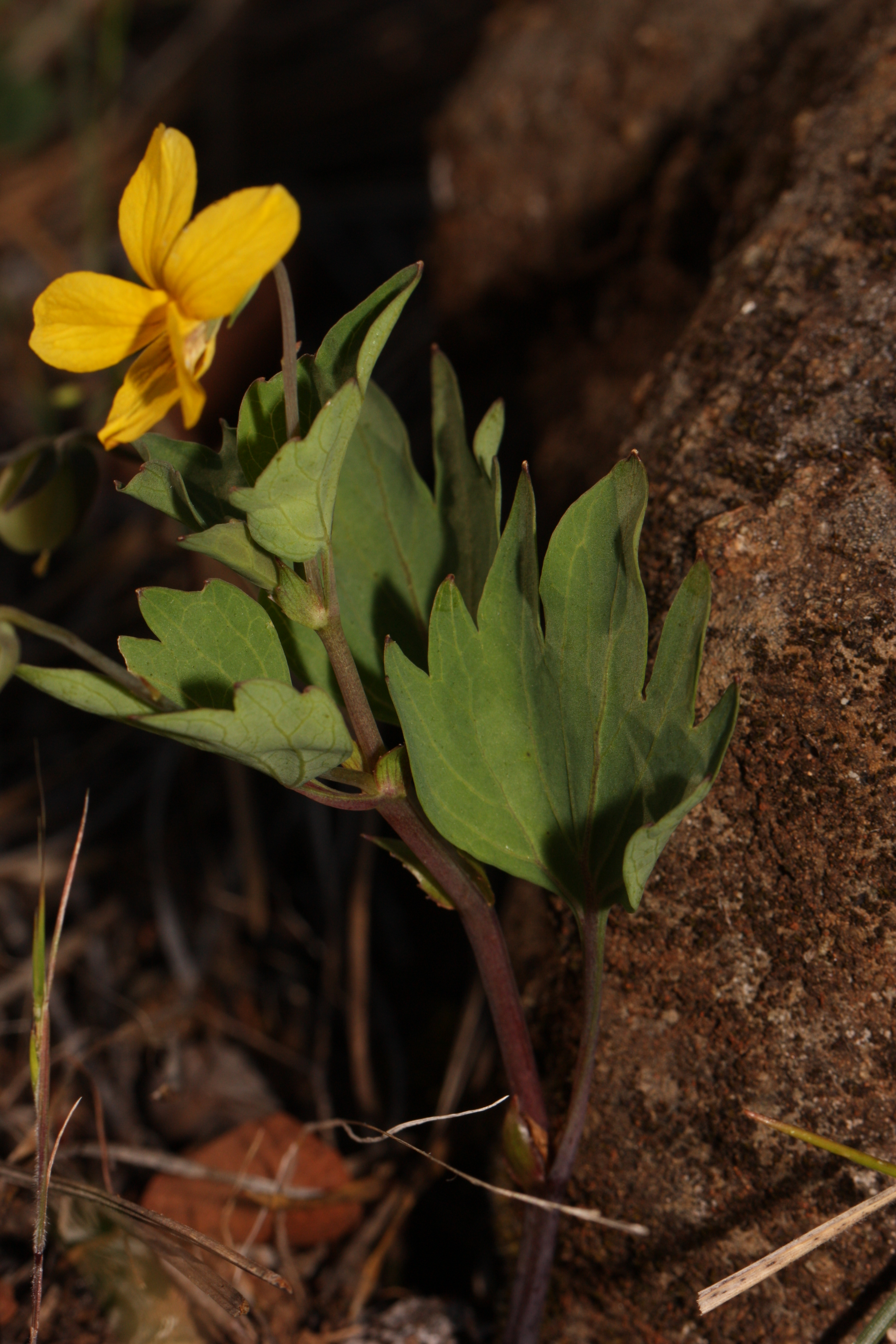

Conservation status
- Apparently Secure (NatureServe)

Scientific classification
- Kingdom: Plantae
- Clade: Tracheophytes
- Clade: Angiosperms
- Clade: Eudicots
- Clade: Rosids
- Order: Malpighiales
- Family: Violaceae
- Genus: Viola
- Species: V. lobata

Binomial name
- Viola lobata Benth.

= Viola lobata =

Species of flowering plant

Viola lobata is a species of violet known by the common name pine violet. It is native to western North America from southern Oregon through California and into northern Baja California, where it occurs in mountain ranges and foothills. It grows in woodlands and other habitat. This rhizomatous herb produces an erect stem a few centimeters tall or growing to nearly half a meter in maximum height. The leaves have variously shaped blades borne on long petioles. The blades are 5 to 15 centimeters wide and may be hairless, hairy, or waxy in texture. The leaf blades are often divided into narrow lobes or dissected into small segments. The shape of the leaf blade differentiates the two subspecies; ssp. lobata has dissected leaves and ssp. integrifolia has entire or toothed blades. A solitary flower is borne on a long, upright stem. It has five yellow petals, all five or just the lower three with purple or brown veining and the upper two stained with purple or brown on the outer surfaces.
