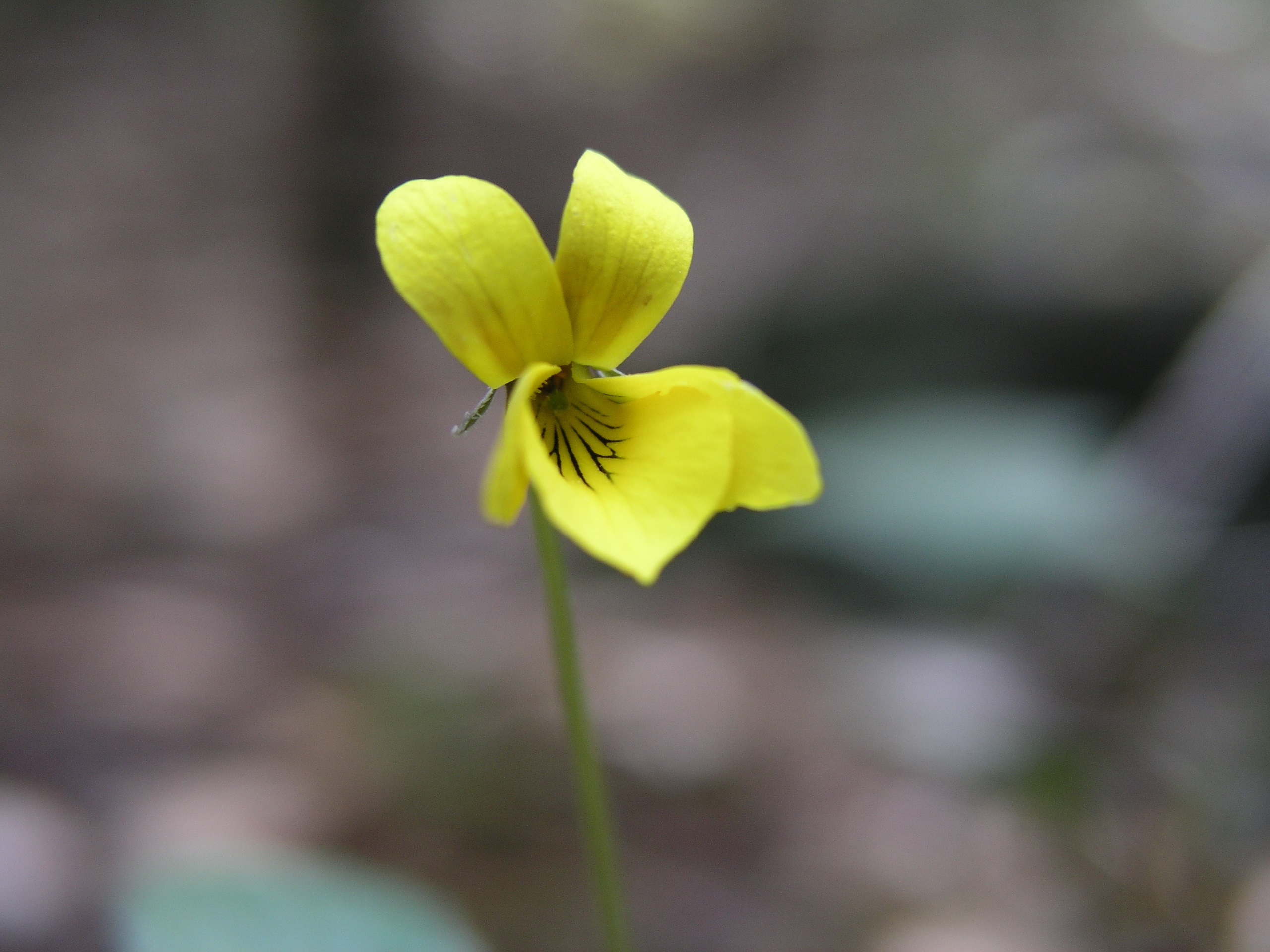

Scientific classification
- Kingdom: Plantae
- Clade: Tracheophytes
- Clade: Angiosperms
- Clade: Eudicots
- Clade: Rosids
- Order: Malpighiales
- Family: Violaceae
- Genus: Viola
- Species: V. sheltonii

Binomial name
- Viola sheltonii Torr.

= Viola sheltonii =

Species of flowering plant

Viola sheltonii is a species of violet known by the common names Shelton's violet and fan violet. It is native to the western United States where it occurs in forests, woodlands, and chaparral habitat. This rhizomatous herb produces a cluster of stems up to about 27 centimeters tall. The fan-like leaf blades are each divided into leaflets which are deeply dissected into narrow segments, the whole blade borne on a long petiole. A solitary flower is borne on a long, upright stem. It has five yellow petals, the lower three veined with purple-brown and the upper two stained purple-brown on the outer surfaces.
