= Viola minuscula =

Scientific classification
- Kingdom: Plantae
- Clade: Tracheophytes
- Clade: Angiosperms
- Clade: Eudicots
- Clade: Rosids
- Order: Malpighiales
- Family: Violaceae
- Genus: Viola
- Species: V. minuscula

Binomial name
- Viola minuscula Greene

Synonyms
- Viola domingensis Urb.; Viola pallens f. alba L.R.Perkins; Viola pallens var. subreptans J.Rousseau

Species of plant

Viola minuscula, the northern white violet, is a species of flowering plant in the family Violaceae, native to Canada, the United States, and the Dominican Republic. A perennial found in many different wetland habitats, in warmer parts of the United States it is confined to mountainous areas.
