= Viola angustifolia =

Scientific classification
- Kingdom: Plantae
- Clade: Tracheophytes
- Clade: Angiosperms
- Clade: Eudicots
- Clade: Rosids
- Order: Malpighiales
- Family: Violaceae
- Genus: Viola
- Species: V. angustifolia

Binomial name
- Viola angustifolia Phil.

Synonyms
- Viola wikipedia J.M.Watson & A.R.Flores (nom. illeg.)

Species of flowering plant

Viola angustifolia is a species of flowering plant in the genus Viola.

== Taxonomy ==
This species was first described in 1857 by the Chilean paleontologist and zoologist Rudolph Amandus Philippi.

In 2019 the husband-and-wife team of rock gardening enthusiasts John Michael Watson and Ana Rosa Flores renamed the species to V. wikipedia, after Wikipedia, a free-content online encyclopedia. They did so believing that the name V. angustifolia was a later homonym, and thus illegitimate. Indeed, the name "Viola angustifolia" had been published prior to Philippi's description, in 1824 by the Swiss historian and botanist Frédéric Charles Jean Gingins de la Sarraz, in the famous Prodromus of Alphonse Pyramus de Candolle. However, this publication cites it as a nomen nudum synonymous to the species Pigea banksiana, which is now known as Hybanthus enneaspermus. The name had been proposed on a specimen sheet collected in India, but had never been validly published. As such, this name is what is known as a pro synonymo, a name which cannot be considered as validly published because it is merely a synonymy citation. Therefore, Philippi's description is in fact the first valid publication of the name "V. angustifolia", and V. wikipedia is thus a superfluous and illegitimate name.

== Description ==
It is closely related to V. acanthophylla, V. bustillosia, and V. cheeseana, the latter being newly described by Watson and Flores. It is differentiated from these other species by having a "leaf margin shallowly long-serrate. Peduncle clearly shorter than leaves".

== Distribution ==
The species is presumed to be endemic to the Santiago region of Chile. It is known only from a specimen collected in 1855.
