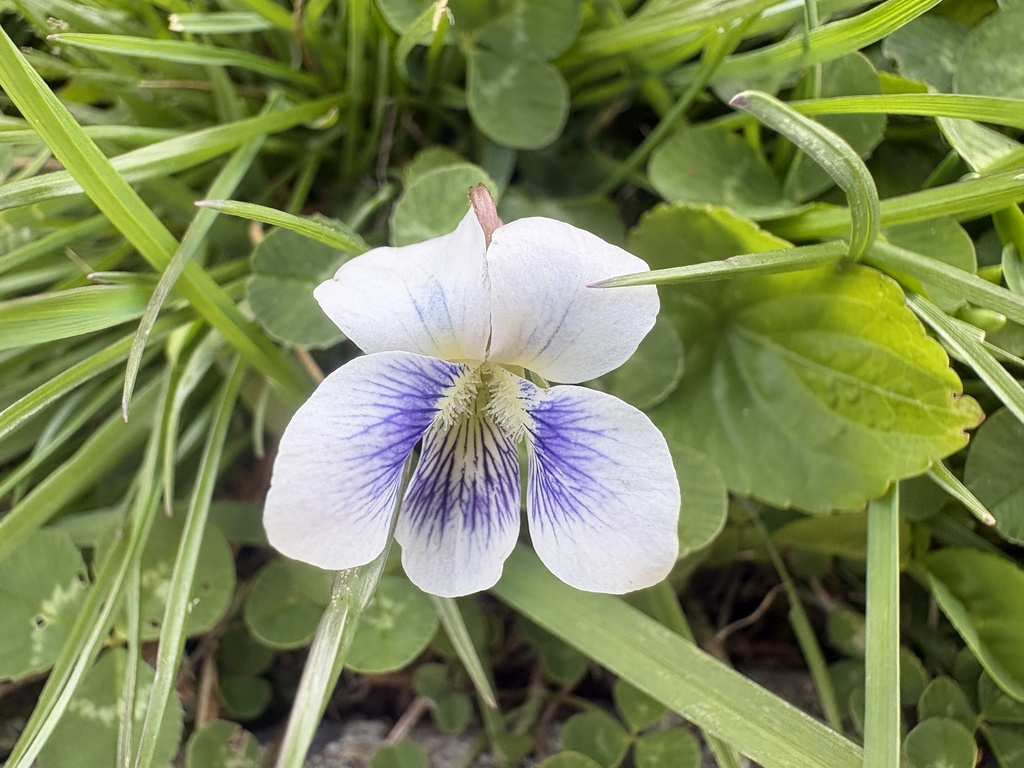

Scientific classification
- Kingdom: Plantae
- Clade: Embryophytes
- Clade: Tracheophytes
- Clade: Spermatophytes
- Clade: Angiosperms
- Clade: Eudicots
- Clade: Rosids
- Order: Malpighiales
- Family: Violaceae
- Genus: Viola
- Species: V. communis

Binomial name
- Viola communis Pollard

Synonyms
- Viola domestica var. communis (Pollard) Farw

= Viola communis =

Species of flowering plant

Viola communis is a species of flowering plant in the family Violaceae.

== Range ==
Viola communis is native to the temperate biome of the north-central and eastern United States.

== Taxonomy ==
Viola communis was named in 1998, by Charles Louis Pollard.

Viola communis contains the following forms:

- Viola communis priceana
- Viola communis communis
