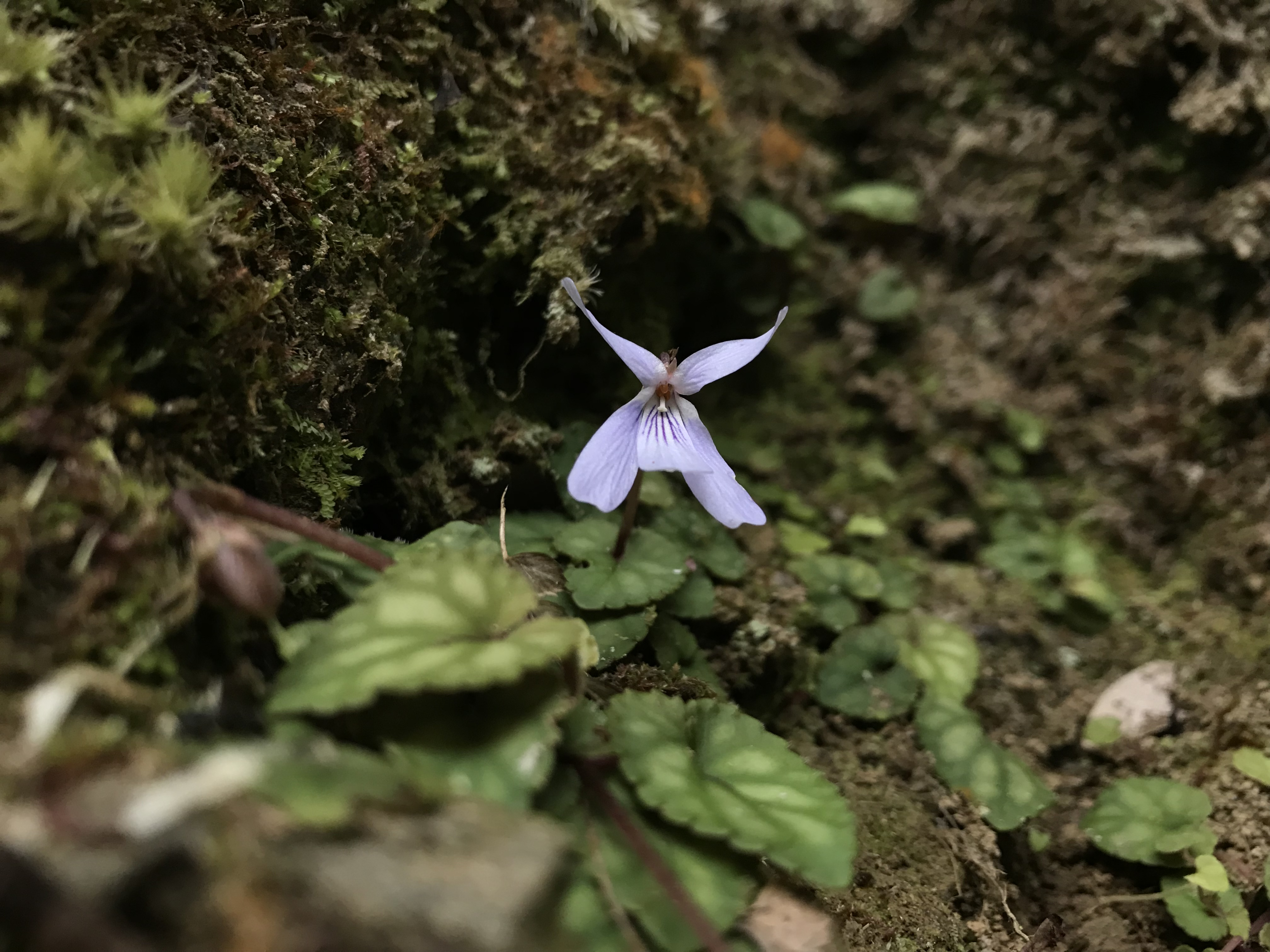
- In Chatianshan Nature Reserve

Scientific classification
- Kingdom: Plantae
- Clade: Tracheophytes
- Clade: Angiosperms
- Clade: Eudicots
- Clade: Rosids
- Order: Malpighiales
- Family: Violaceae
- Genus: Viola
- Species: V. formosana

Binomial name
- Viola formosana Hayata

Synonyms
- Viola arisanensis W.Becker; Viola formosana f. albiflora S.S.Ying; Viola formosana var. stenopetala (Hayata) J.C.Wang, T.C.Huang & T.Hashimoto; Viola formosana var. tozanensis (Hayata) C.F.Hsieh; Viola hypoleuca Hayata; Viola kawakamii Hayata; Viola kawakamii var. stenopetala Hayata; Viola matsudae Hayata; Viola takasagoensis Koidz.; Viola tozanensis Hayata

= Viola formosana =

Species of plant

Viola formosana is a species of flowering plant in the violet family Violaceae, native to Taiwan. A perennial reaching 15 cm (6 in), it is found in mountainous areas in forests or grassy slopes.

== Subtaxa ==
The following varieties are accepted:

- Viola formosana var. formosana – 1,400 to 2,500 m (4,600 to 8,200 ft)
- Viola formosana var. kawakamii (Hayata) Y.S.Chen & Q.E.Yang – 1,200 to 2,400 m (3,900 to 7,900 ft)
