= Viola abbreviata =

Scientific classification
- Kingdom: Plantae
- Clade: Tracheophytes
- Clade: Angiosperms
- Clade: Eudicots
- Clade: Rosids
- Order: Malpighiales
- Family: Violaceae
- Genus: Viola
- Species: V. abbreviata

Binomial name
- Viola abbreviata J.M.Watson & A.R.Flores

Species of flowering plant

Viola abbreviata is a plant in the Violaceae family. It is a perennial. It is endemic to Argentina.
