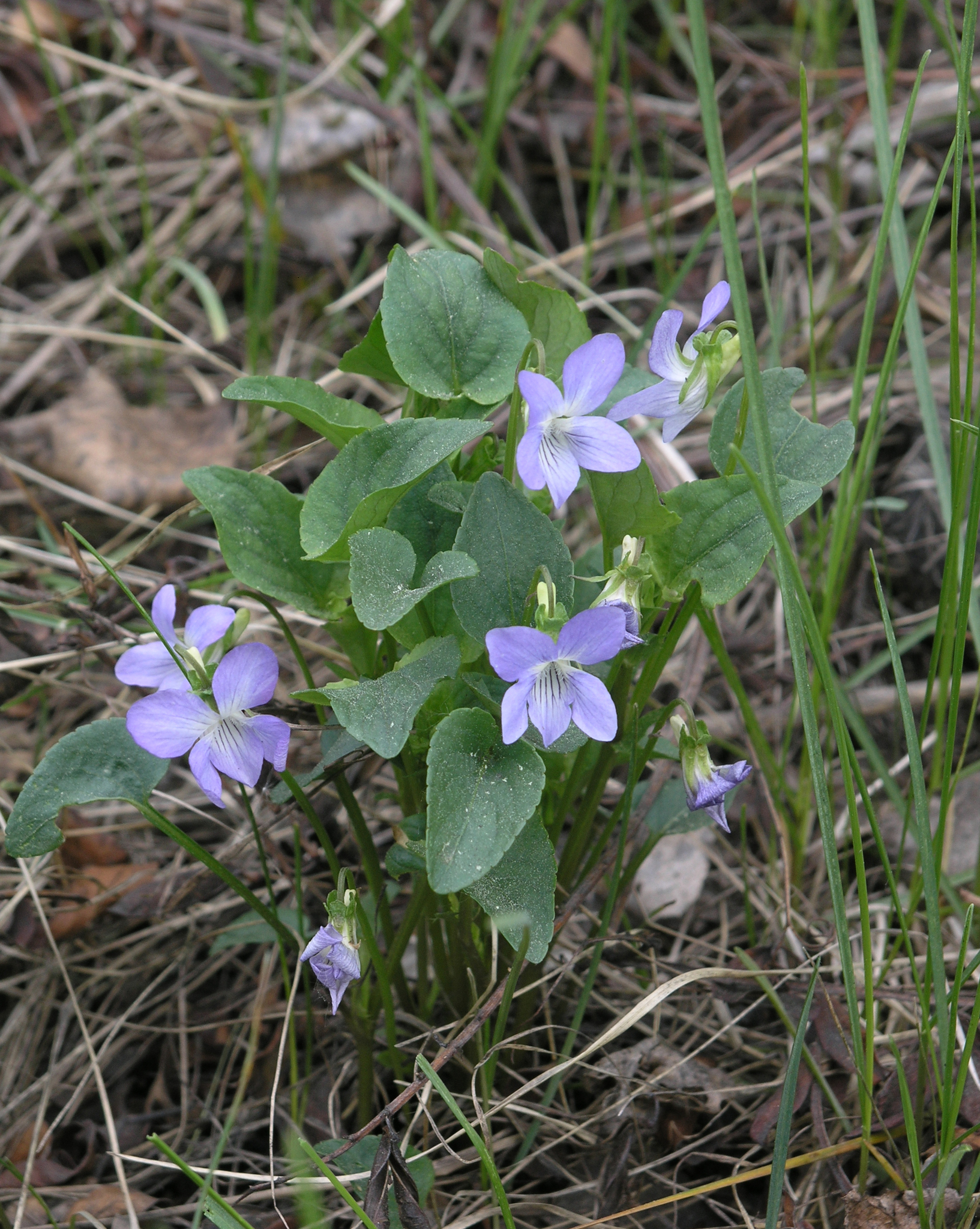

Scientific classification
- Kingdom: Plantae
- Clade: Tracheophytes
- Clade: Angiosperms
- Clade: Eudicots
- Clade: Rosids
- Order: Malpighiales
- Family: Violaceae
- Genus: Viola
- Species: V. nemoralis

Binomial name
- Viola nemoralis Kütz.

= Viola nemoralis =

Species of flowering plant

Viola nemoralis is a species of flowering plant in the family Violaceae.

It is native to Europe to Mongolia, Morocco.
