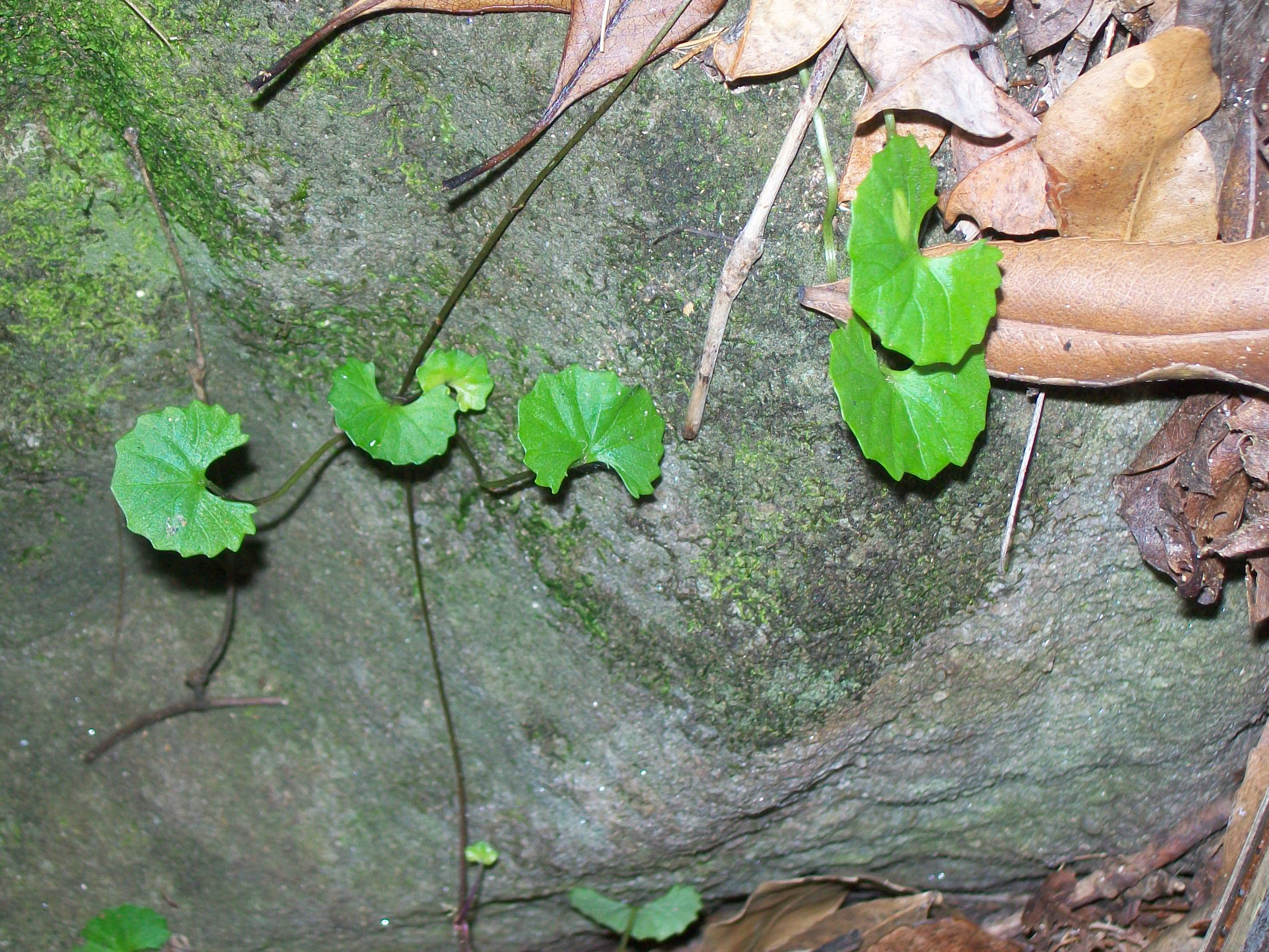

Scientific classification
- Kingdom: Plantae
- Clade: Tracheophytes
- Clade: Angiosperms
- Clade: Eudicots
- Clade: Rosids
- Order: Malpighiales
- Family: Violaceae
- Genus: Viola
- Species: V. perreniformis

Binomial name
- Viola perreniformis (L.G.Adams) R.J.Little & Leiper

Synonyms
- Viola hederacea subsp. perreniformis

= Viola perreniformis =

Species of flowering plant

Viola perreniformis is a species of violet, native to eastern Australia. Growing in moist rocky situations, north of Sydney.
