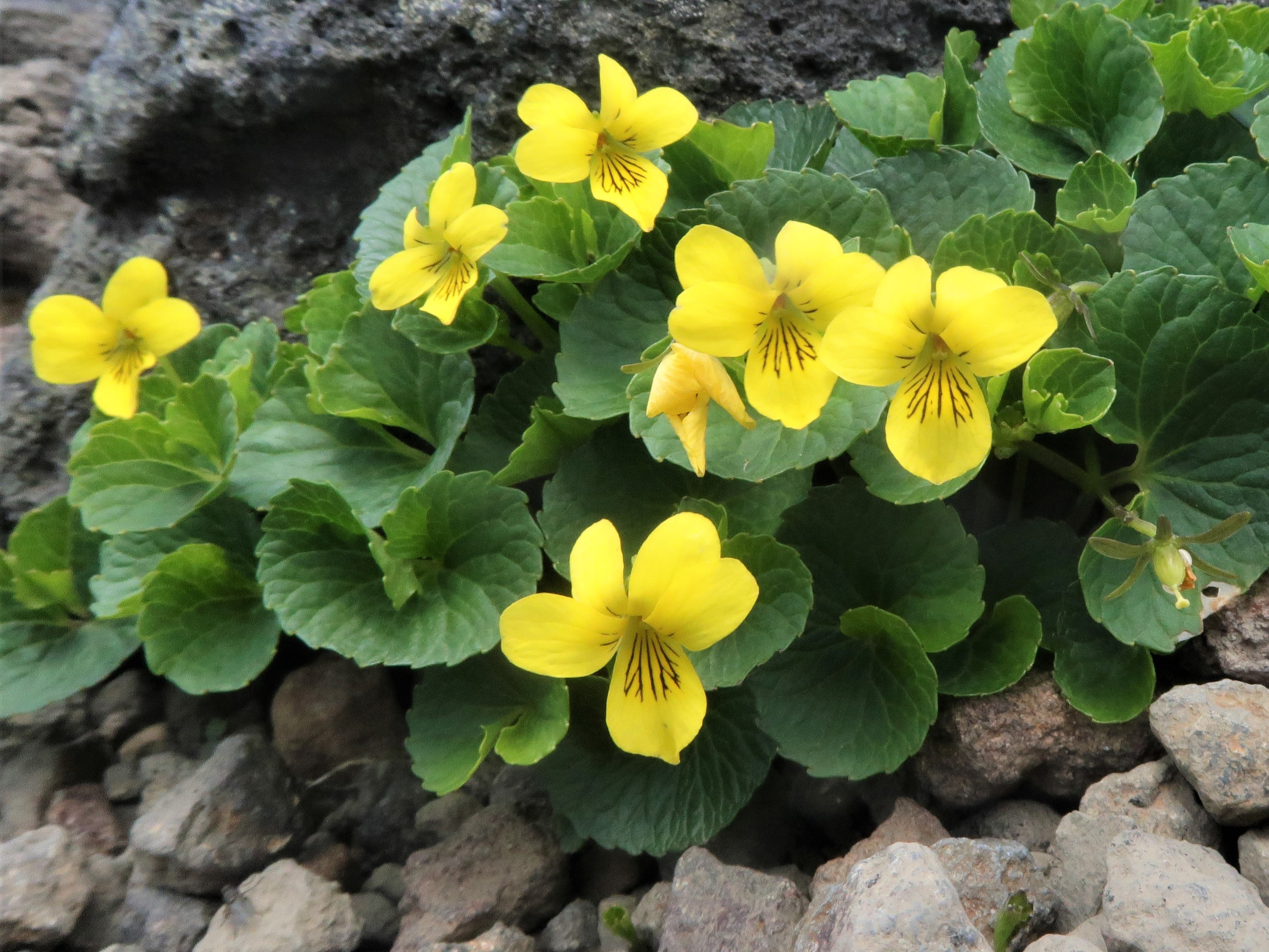

Scientific classification
- Kingdom: Plantae
- Clade: Tracheophytes
- Clade: Angiosperms
- Clade: Eudicots
- Clade: Rosids
- Order: Malpighiales
- Family: Violaceae
- Genus: Viola
- Species: V. crassa

Binomial name
- Viola crassa Makino

Synonyms
- Heterotypic Synonyms: Viola avatschensis W.Becker & Hultén; Viola biflora subsp. avatschensis (W.Becker & Hultén) Tzvelev; Viola crassa subsp. alpicola Hid.Takah.; Viola crassa var. alpicola (Hid.Takah.) T.Shimizu; Viola crassa subsp. avatschensis (W.Becker & Hultén) Espeut; Viola crassa subsp. borealis Hid.Takah.; Viola crassa var. borealis (Hid.Takah.) T.Shimizu; Viola crassa var. shikkensis Miyabe & Tatew.; Viola crassa f. subpubescens Hiyama; Viola crassa subsp. yatsugatakeana Hid.Takah.; Viola crassa var. yatsugatakeana (Hid.Takah.) T.Shimizu

= Viola crassa =

Species of plant

Viola crassa is a species of flowering plant in the family Violaceae. It is native to Japan, Kamchatka Krai, the Kuril Islands, and Sakhalin.

== Taxonomy ==
Viola crassa contains the following subspecies:

- Viola crassa subsp. alpicola
- Viola crassa subsp. crassa
- Viola crassa subsp. yatsugatakeana
