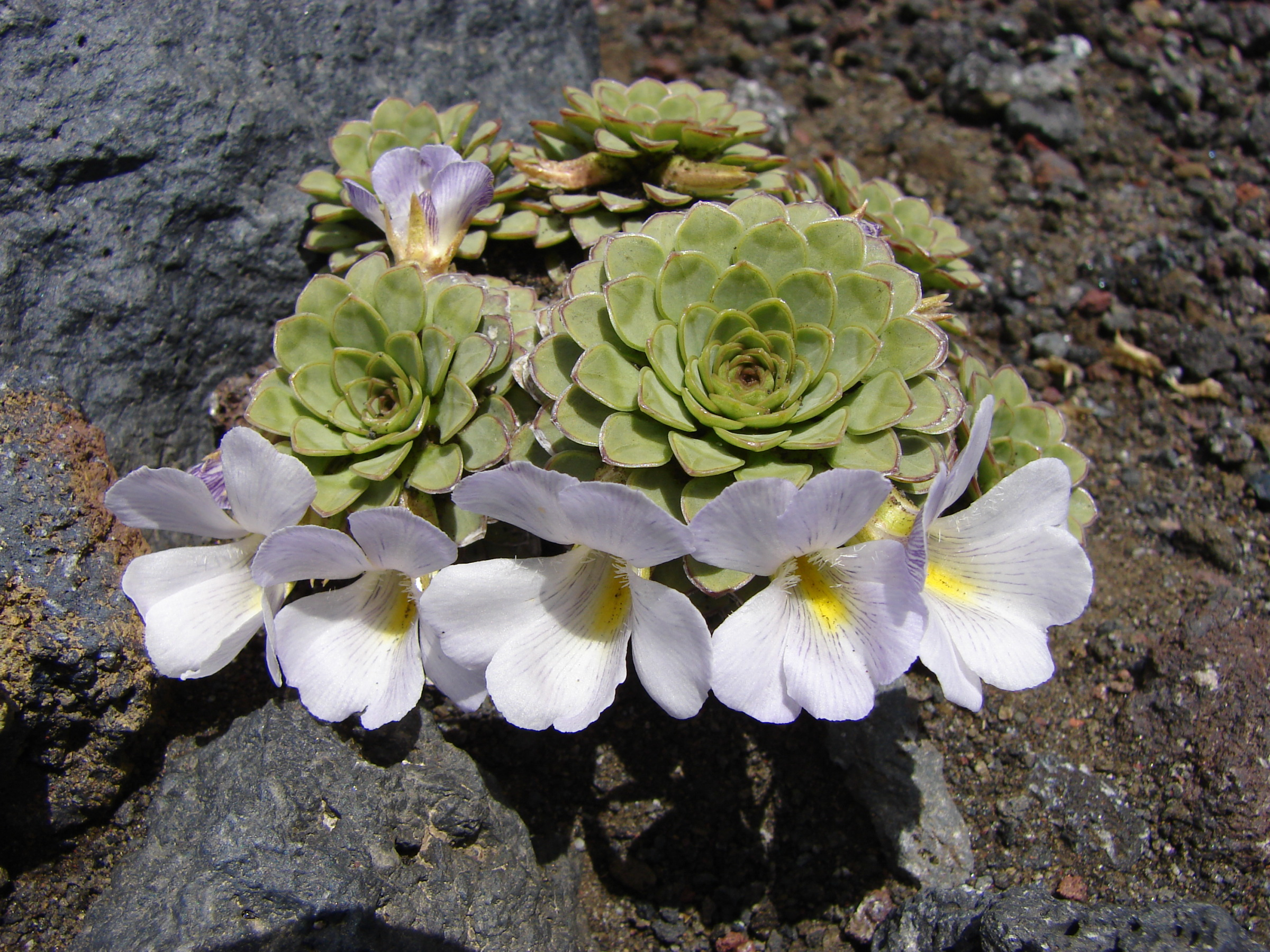

Scientific classification
- Kingdom: Plantae
- Clade: Tracheophytes
- Clade: Angiosperms
- Clade: Eudicots
- Clade: Rosids
- Order: Malpighiales
- Family: Violaceae
- Genus: Viola
- Species: V. cotyledon

Binomial name
- Viola cotyledon Ging.

= Viola cotyledon =

Species of plant

Viola cotyledon is a flowering plant in the family Violaceae, native to Argentina and Chile. Growing to 50 cm (20 in) tall and broad, it is an evergreen perennial forming dense clusters of semi-succulent leaves. Flowers appear in a ring around the edge of each plant in summer. Flower colour is variable, from white through violet to dark blue.

It occurs in the temperate biome of western Argentina and southern central Chile.

It is hardy to −10 °C (14 °F), but needs a sheltered position in free-draining soil and high levels of light.

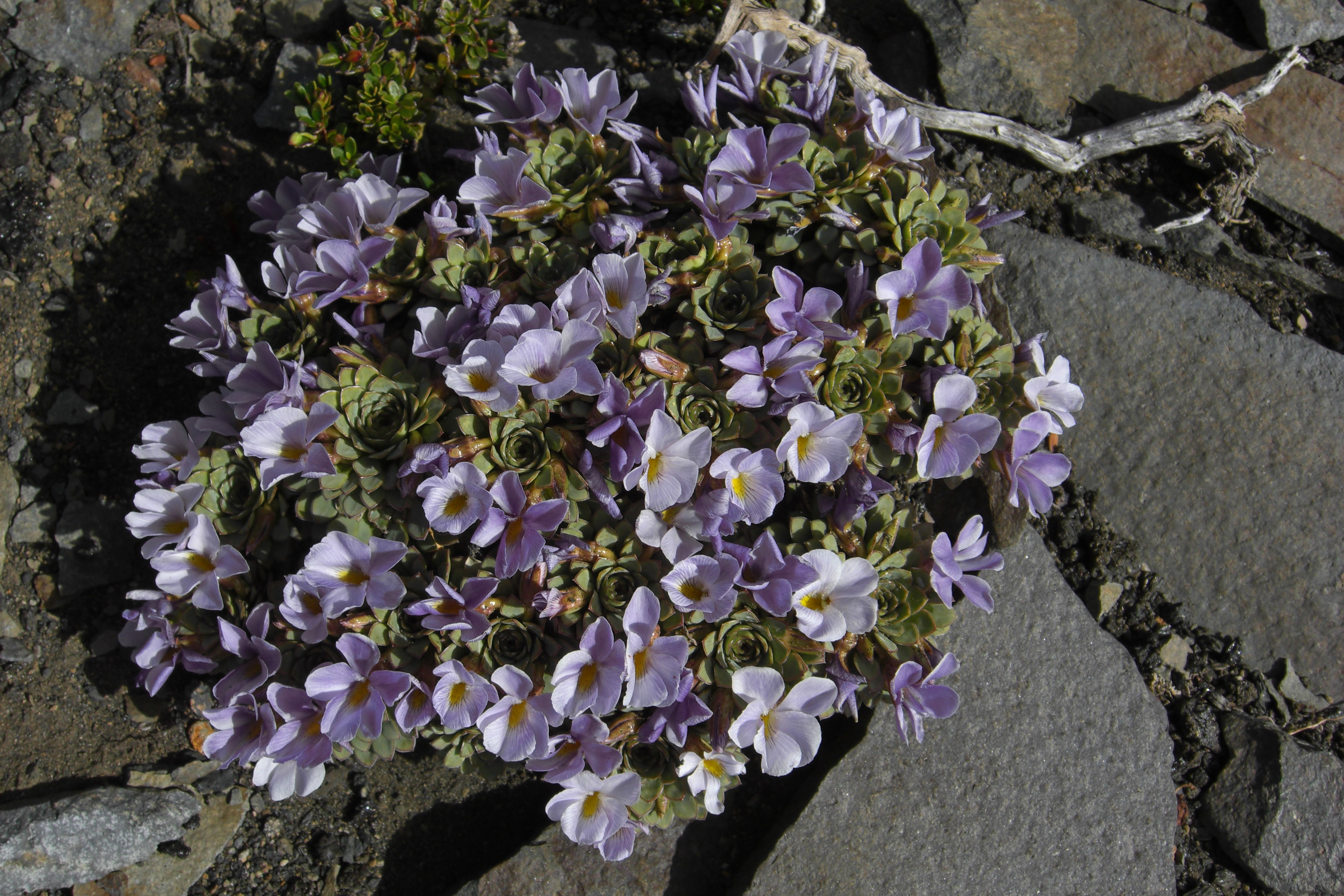

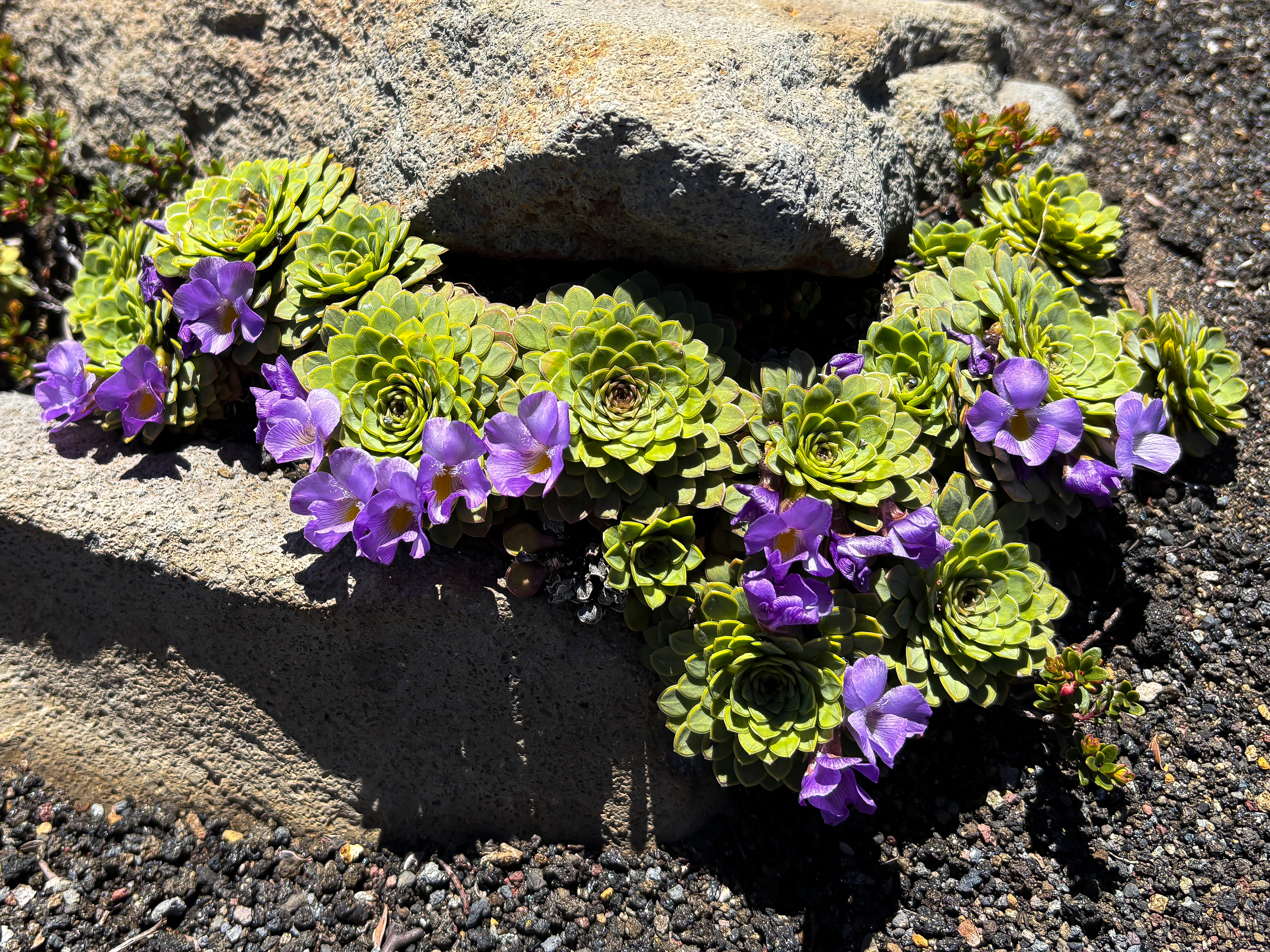
A Viola Cotyledon in the Sierra Nevada Volcano in Southern Chile
