= List of Canadian plants by family U–W =

Main page: List of Canadian plants by family

The following families of vascular plants are listed as occurring in Canada:

For mosses of Canada, see:

== Ulmaceae ==
- Ulmus americana — American elm
- Ulmus rubra — slippery elm
- Ulmus thomasii — rock elm

== Urticaceae ==
- Boehmeria cylindrica — smallspike false nettle
- Laportea canadensis — Canada wood-nettle
- Parietaria pensylvanica — Pennsylvania pellitory
- Pilea fontana — springs clearweed
- Pilea pumila — Canada clearweed
- Urtica dioica — stinging nettle

== Valerianaceae ==
- Plectritis congesta — pink plectritis
- Plectritis macrocera — white plectritis
- Valeriana capitata — clustered valerian
- Valeriana dioica — wood valerian
- Valeriana edulis — hairy valerian
- Valeriana scouleri — Scouler's valerian
- Valeriana sitchensis — Sitka valerian
- Valeriana uliginosa — marsh valerian
- Valerianella chenopodiifolia — goosefoot cornsalad
- Valerianella umbilicata — navel-shape cornsalad

== Verbenaceae ==
- Glandularia bipinnatifida — Dakota vervain
- Phryma leptostachya — American lopseed
- Phyla lanceolata — fog-fruit
- Verbena bracteata — largebract vervain
- Verbena hastata — blue vervain
- Verbena simplex — narrowleaf vervain
- Verbena stricta — hoary vervain
- Verbena urticifolia — white vervain
- Verbena x deamii
- Verbena x engelmannii
- Verbena x perriana
- Verbena x rydbergii

== Violaceae ==
- Hybanthus concolor — green violet
- Viola adunca — sand violet
- Viola affinis — Le Conte's violet
- Viola bicolor — field pansy
- Viola biflora — northern violet
- Viola blanda — smooth white violet
- Viola canadensis — Canada violet
- Viola conspersa — American bog violet
- Viola cucullata — marsh blue violet
- Viola epipsila — northern marsh violet
- Viola glabella — smooth yellow woodland violet
- Viola howellii — Howell's violet
- Viola labradorica — Labrador violet
- Viola lanceolata — lanceleaf violet
- Viola langsdorffii — Aleutian violet
- Viola macloskeyi — smooth white violet
- Viola missouriensis — Missouri violet
- Viola nephrophylla — northern bog violet
- Viola novae-angliae — New England violet
- Viola nuttallii — Nuttall's violet
- Viola orbiculata — western rough-leaved violet
- Viola palustris — alpine marsh violet
- Viola pedata — bird's-foot violet
- Viola pedatifida — prairie violet
- Viola praemorsa — upland yellow violet
- Viola primulifolia — primrose-leaf violet
- Viola pubescens — downy yellow violet
- Viola purpurea — pine violet
- Viola renifolia — kidneyleaf white violet
- Viola rostrata — longspur violet
- Viola rotundifolia — roundleaf violet
- Viola sagittata — arrowleaf violet
- Viola selkirkii — great-spurred violet
- Viola sempervirens — redwood violet
- Viola septentrionalis — northern blue violet
- Viola sororia — woolly blue violet
- Viola striata — striped violet
- Viola triloba — three-lobed violet
- Viola vallicola — valley violet
- Viola x bissellii
- Viola x brauniae
- Viola x conjugens
- Viola x eclipes
- Viola x filicetorum
- Viola x malteana
- Viola x melissifolia
- Viola x palmata — early blue violet
- Viola x parca
- Viola x populifolia
- Viola x porteriana — Stone's violet
- Viola x primulifolia — primrose-leaf violet
- Viola x sublanceolata

== Viscaceae ==
- Arceuthobium americanum — American mistletoe
- Arceuthobium campylopodum — western dwarf-mistletoe
- Arceuthobium douglasii — Douglas-fir dwarf-mistletoe
- Arceuthobium laricis — larch dwarf-mistletoe
- Arceuthobium pusillum — dwarf mistletoe
- Arceuthobium tsugense — hemlock dwarf-mistletoe

== Vitaceae ==
- Parthenocissus quinquefolia — Virginia creeper
- Parthenocissus vitacea — woodbine
- Vitis aestivalis — summer grape
- Vitis labrusca — northern fox grape
- Vitis riparia — riverbank grape
- Vitis vulpina — winter grape

== Woodsiaceae ==
- Athyrium americanum — American alpine ladyfern
- Athyrium filix-femina — lady fern
- Cystopteris bulbifera — bulblet fern
- Cystopteris fragilis — fragile fern
- Cystopteris laurentiana — Laurentian bladderfern
- Cystopteris montana — mountain bladderfern
- Cystopteris protrusa — lowland brittle fern
- Cystopteris tenuis — upland brittle bladderfern
- Deparia acrostichoides — silver false spleenwort
- Diplazium pycnocarpon — glade fern
- Gymnocarpium disjunctum — Pacific oak fern
- Gymnocarpium dryopteris — northern oak fern
- Gymnocarpium jessoense — northern oak fern
- Gymnocarpium robertianum — limestone oak fern
- Gymnocarpium x achriosporum
- Gymnocarpium x brittonianum
- Gymnocarpium x intermedium
- Physematium oreganum — western cliff fern
- Physematium obtusum — bluntlobe woodsia
- Physematium scopulinum — Rocky Mountain woodsia
- Woodsia alpina — northern woodsia
- Woodsia glabella — smooth woodsia
- Woodsia ilvensis — rusty woodsia
- Woodsia x abbeae
- Woodsia x gracilis
- Woodsia x maxonii
- Woodsia x tryonis
