= List of Violales of Montana =

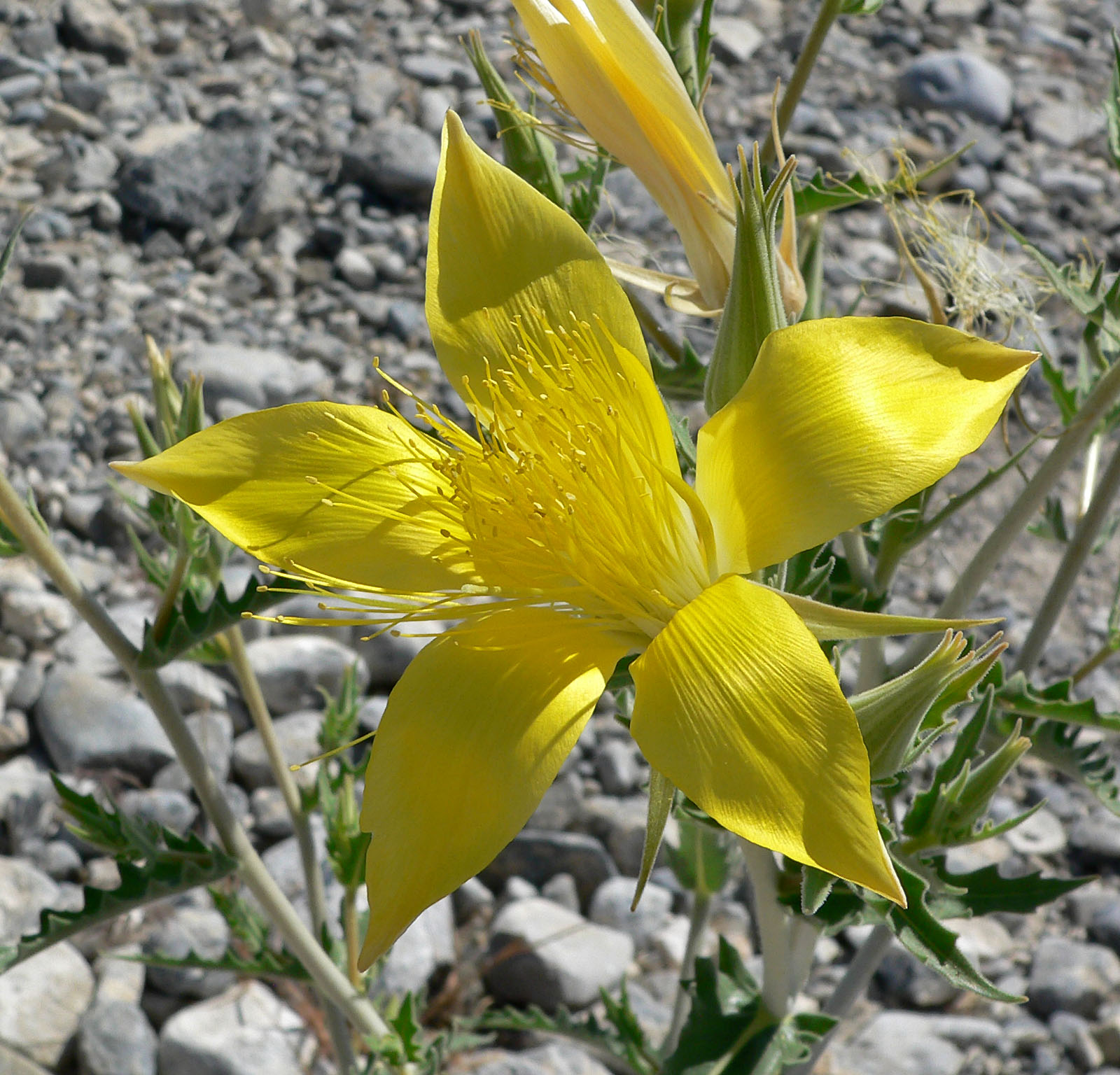
Giant blazingstar, Mentzelia laevicaulis

There are at least 25 members of the order Violales found in Montana. Some of these species are exotics (not native to Montana) and some species have been designated as Species of Concern.

== Blazingstar and stickleaf ==
Family: Loasaceae

- Mentzelia albicaulis, white-stem stickleaf
- Mentzelia decapetala, ten-petal blazingstar
- Mentzelia dispersa, mada stickleaf
- Mentzelia laevicaulis, giant blazingstar
- Mentzelia nuda, bractless blazingstar
- Mentzelia pumila, dwarf mentzelia

== Cucumber ==
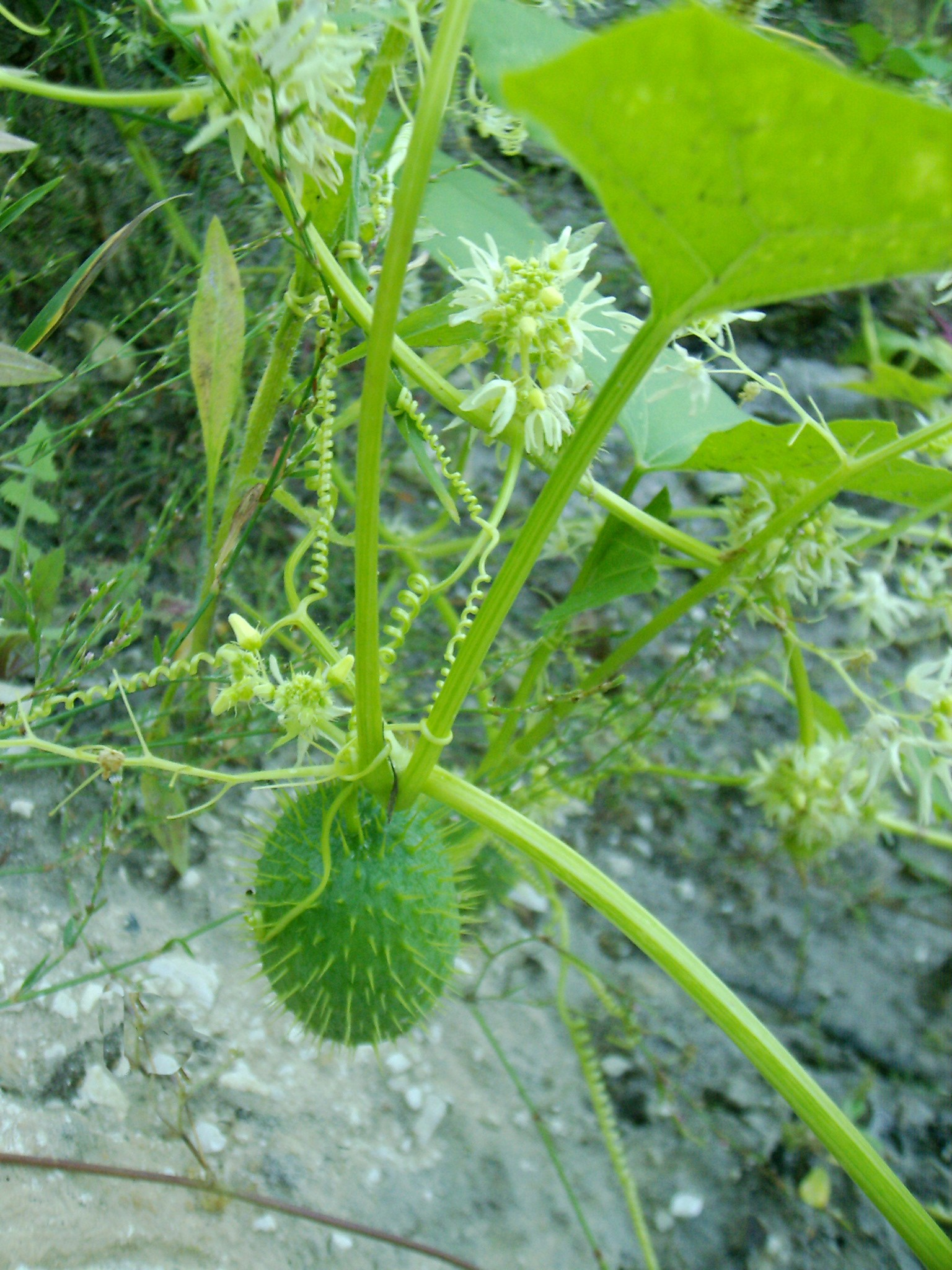
Wild cucumber, Echinocystis lobata

Family: Cucurbitaceae

- Bryonia alba, white bryony
- Echinocystis lobata, wild cucumber

== Tamarisk ==
Family: Tamaricaceae

- Tamarix ramosissima, salt-cedar

== Violets ==
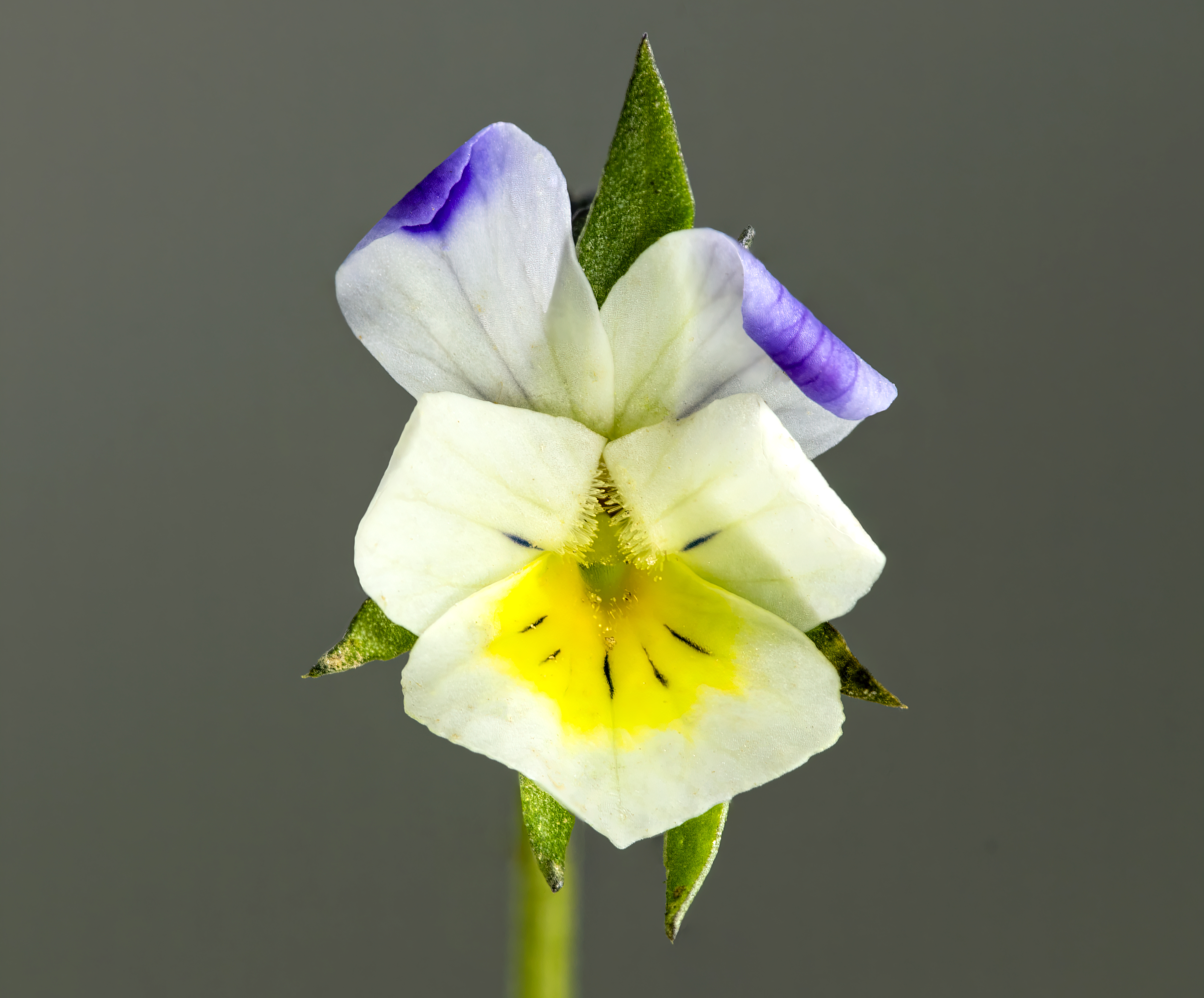
Small wild pansy, Viola arvensis

Family: Violaceae

- Viola adunca, sand violet
- Viola arvensis, small wild pansy
- Viola canadensis, Canada violet
- Viola glabella, smooth yellow woodland violet
- Viola macloskeyi, smooth white violet
- Viola nephrophylla, northern bog violet
- Viola nuttallii, Nuttall's violet
- Viola nuttallii var. praemorsa, upland yellow violet
- Viola nuttallii var. vallicola, valley violet
- Viola orbiculata, roundleaf violet
- Viola palustris, alpine marsh violet
- Viola pedatifida, prairie violet
- Viola purpurea, pine violet
- Viola renifolia, kidney-leaf white violet
- Viola selkirkii, great-spurred violet
- Viola septentrionalis, northern blue violet

== See also ==
- List of dicotyledons of Montana
