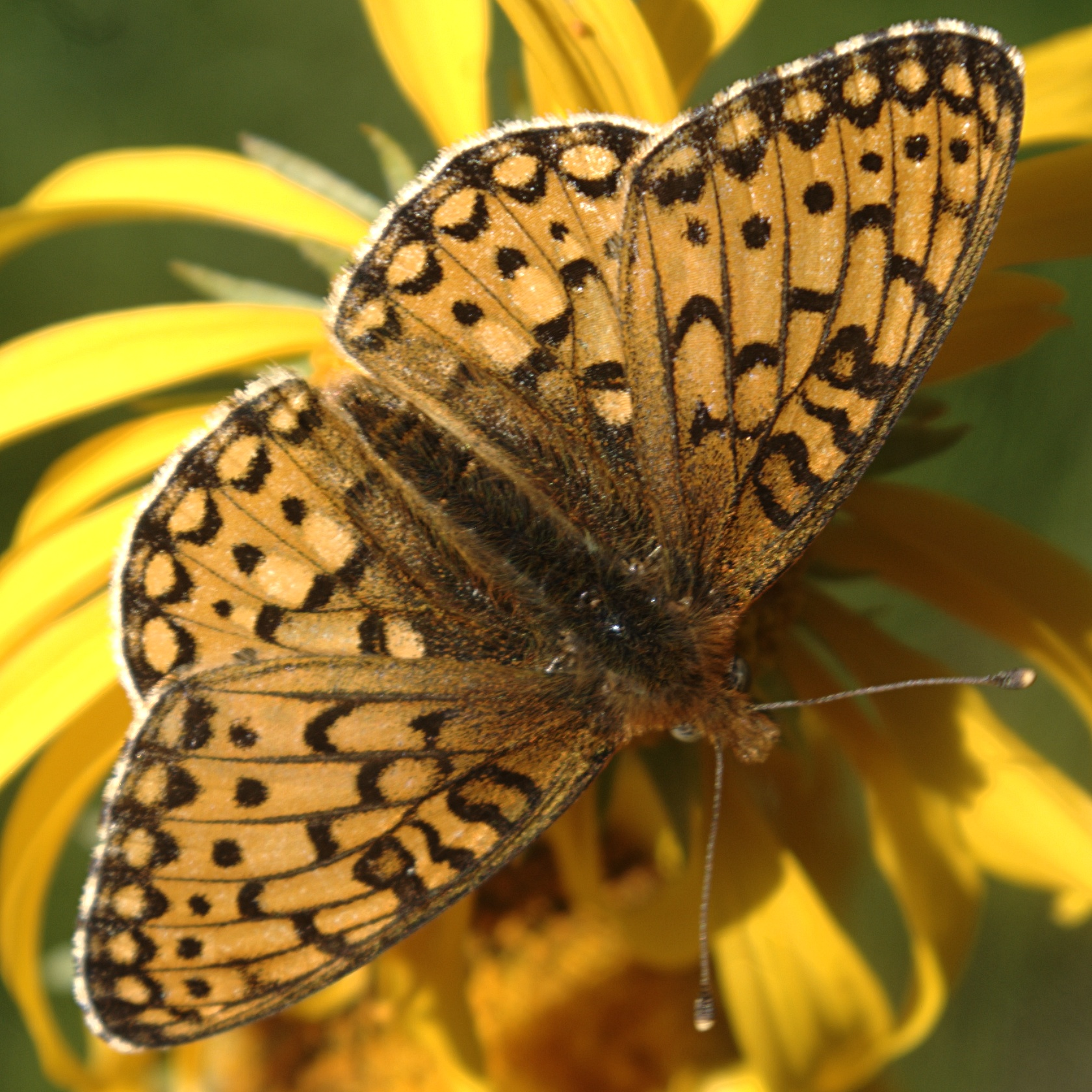

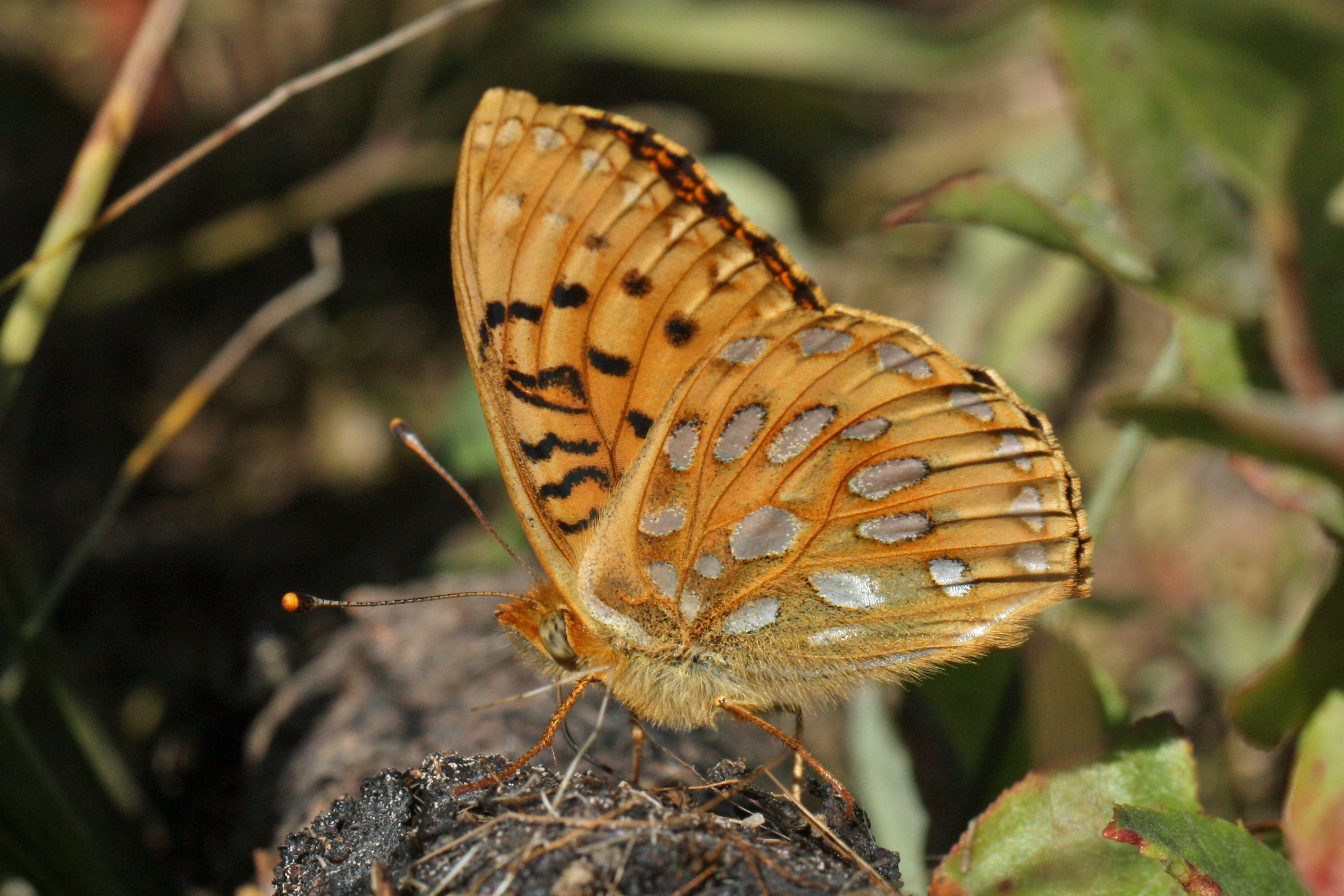

Scientific classification
- Kingdom: Animalia
- Phylum: Arthropoda
- Clade: Pancrustacea
- Class: Insecta
- Order: Lepidoptera
- Family: Nymphalidae
- Genus: Speyeria
- Species: S. mormonia

Binomial name
- Speyeria mormonia (Boisduval, 1869)

Synonyms
- Argynnis mormonia Boisduval, 1869

= Speyeria mormonia =

Mormon fritillary

Species of butterfly

Speyeria mormonia, commonly known as the Mormon fritillary, is a North American butterfly belonging to the family Nymphalidae. It is highly diverse, having differentiated into several subspecies which occupy a wide geographic range. S. mormonia exhibits extreme protandry, which is the emergence of male adults before female adults. This has several consequences on male and female behavior. Habitat specificity is still being investigated, as there are few known environmental predictors, and S. mormonia appears to be associated with a wide range of habitats. This species is not under threat, and conservation efforts are generally not necessary.

== Geographic range ==
S. mormonia is found throughout western North America, with significant populations in both the United States and Canada. Four subspecies are present in Canada, from the Yukon region through British Columbia. Several more subspecies are present in the United States, with montane populations in the Colorado Rocky Mountains, and mesic populations in California and Nevada. S. mormonia is a wide-ranging species compared to other Speyeria, and exhibits high genetic variability as a result.

== Habitat ==
S. mormonia occupy a wide range of habitats, including rocky mountainsides, saturated meadows, open grasslands, and clearings within pine forests. Their populations are dependent on climate conditions and availability of nectar from species of Viola (violets), which in turn depends on suitable rainfall to prosper. Furthermore, S. mormonia are reported in both Canada and the US as being found at higher elevations. Populations tend to occur in small, semi-isolated patches. The amount of dispersal between subsites may vary based on the subspecies or population in question. For example, the Canadian subspecies erinna exists at isolated sites, while the Colorado population showed high dispersal between sub-sites.

== Food resources ==
Species of violet are the host plant for larval S. mormonia. There is currently no evidence for a particular species of violet being preferred as a host plant, and S. mormonia has been observed feeding on many species of violet, including Viola dunce, Viola canadensis, Viola glabella, Viola nephrophylla, Viola orbiculate, and Viola renifolia. Violets flower before the peak flight season, meaning that its function as an adult nectar source is limited. Adult feeding also takes place at mud puddles, specifically by males and older females, and on nectar from Compositae plants. Females are more dependent on adult feeding for reproductive success, yet male adult survivorship is more closely dependent on nectar availability.

=== Resource stress ===
Under resource stress, female S. mormonia have the ability to reallocate nutrients from reproduction to survival. They reabsorb unlaid oocytes to supply sufficient nutrients for their own survival, decreasing their overall fecundity and reproductive success. If allowed, females will consume honey-water ad libitum under experimental conditions. These observations reinforce the necessity of adult feeding for reproductive success in females, since sub-sufficient nutrient consumption negatively impacts fecundity in favor of adult survival.

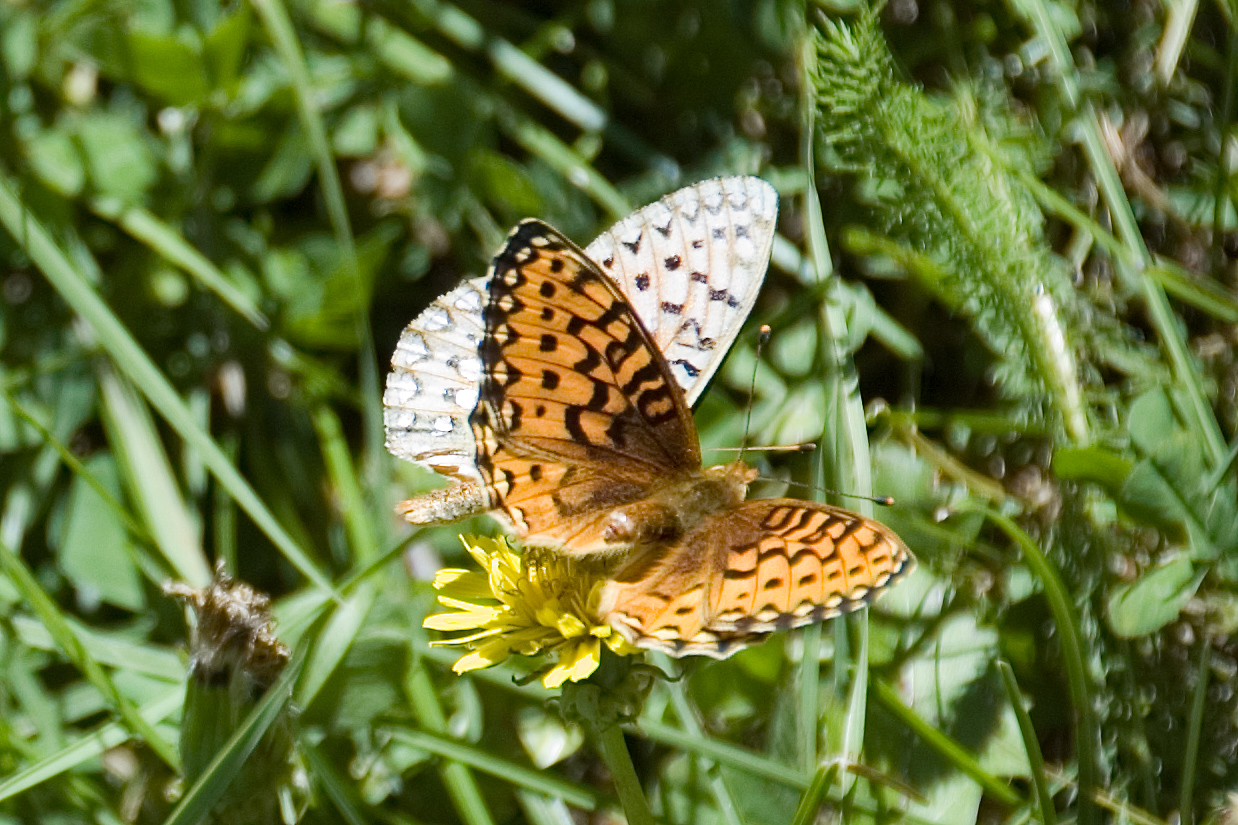

=== Mud puddling ===
Mud puddling refers to a behavior where adult butterflies feed from mud and animal waste, rather than on nectar. In adult S. mormonia, males puddle more than females, and young males puddle more frequently than older males. Furthermore, older females were observed puddling, particularly if their overall lifetime mating count was low. This behavior is explained by the nutrients derived from puddling. Males source sodium at puddles, which they then transfer to females during mating. An older female who has only mated once or twice may have exhausted her sodium supply, and so turns to puddling to refresh her nutrient stores. Young females still retain sodium from their first mating, and therefore have no need to puddle. Females who mate multiply are resupplied sodium with each mating, and similarly do not need to puddle.

== Life cycle ==
=== Egg ===
Eggs are oviposited near hostplants in leaf debris.

=== Caterpillar ===
S. mormonia larvae are tan with black stripes. They diapause as early instars, stopping feeding and development to hibernate through the winter. As late instars, larvae depend on species of violets as their host plants.

=== Pupa ===
Females pupate later than males, presumably to allow for the gathering of more larval-derived nutrients which can be allocated towards reproduction.

=== Adult ===
Males emerge from pupa at least 2 weeks prior to females, and similarly have a peak flight period 2-3 weeks before females. Adult lifespan, observed by C.L. Boggs in a Colorado population over four years, varied between 10 and 40 days.

== Sex ratio ==
Adult sex ratios in S. mormonia are skewed toward males. This potentially results from the species' extreme protandry, i.e. that adult males emerge weeks before females. The prolonged female pupal stage increases the probability of female death before adult eclosion, or emergence. In other words, S. mormonia may lay equal numbers of male and female eggs, but more males successfully make it to adulthood, skewing the sex ratio. This bias has several implications, including high variance in male reproductive success, and the need for larval-derived nutrients for females.

== Subspecies ==
Listed alphabetically:

- S. m. arge (Strecker, 1878)
- S. m. artonis (Edwards, 1881)
- S. m. bischoffii (Edwards, 1870)
- S. m. erinna (Edwards, 1883)
- S. m. eurynome (Edwards, 1872)
- S. m. luski (Barnes & McDunnough, 1913)
- S. m. opis (Edwards, 1874)
- S. m. washingtonia (Barnes & McDunnough, 1913)

== Mating ==
S. mormonia are protandrous, with adult males emerging at least two weeks prior to females. As a result, males are able to mate multiply, while females usually mate only once. Furthermore, roughly 50% of males are unsuccessful at mating. Males actively seek out their mates, flying low over habitats in search of sedentary females. Females are often found on adult nectar plants, as intake of sufficient nectar crucially determines their reproductive success and fecundity. During mating, females receive a sodium transfusion from males, which is used for egg production. If females do have the opportunity to mate multiply, they can derive the bulk of their nutrients from nuptial gifts, and thereby reduce their need to forage for nectar. Following mating, females oviposit near their host plant, violets, but rarely on them. Females can be observed walking amidst the vegetation, searching for an appropriate site to oviposit.

== Physiology ==
The Mormon Fritillary is relatively small in comparison to other fritillaries. Their wings are orange with small black patches, excepting the ventral hindwing, which has a green tinge accented by light silver streaks. These silver streaks vary between subspecies, with some possessing a reflective quality, and others appearing chalk white. On average, female wingspan ranges from 25-27mm, while males have a slightly smaller wingspan, from 23-26mm. These values are specific to a population in Colorado, and wingspan might vary between unique populations and subspecies.

=== Flight ===
S. mormonia are a univoltine species, having one flight period from mid-July through early September. Females and males differ in their peak flight periods, with males flying first, and females following two to three weeks afterwards. Although they have different peaks, both males and females conclude their flight period at the same time, towards the end of August and into early September. Regarding specific flight patterns, both sexes display dispersing habits, with no significant difference between the two. However, males may be more mobile than females, as they fly close to the ground to search for mates. Flight period shows a close dependency on weather patterns, with a lack of rainfall correlating to shorter flight periods.
