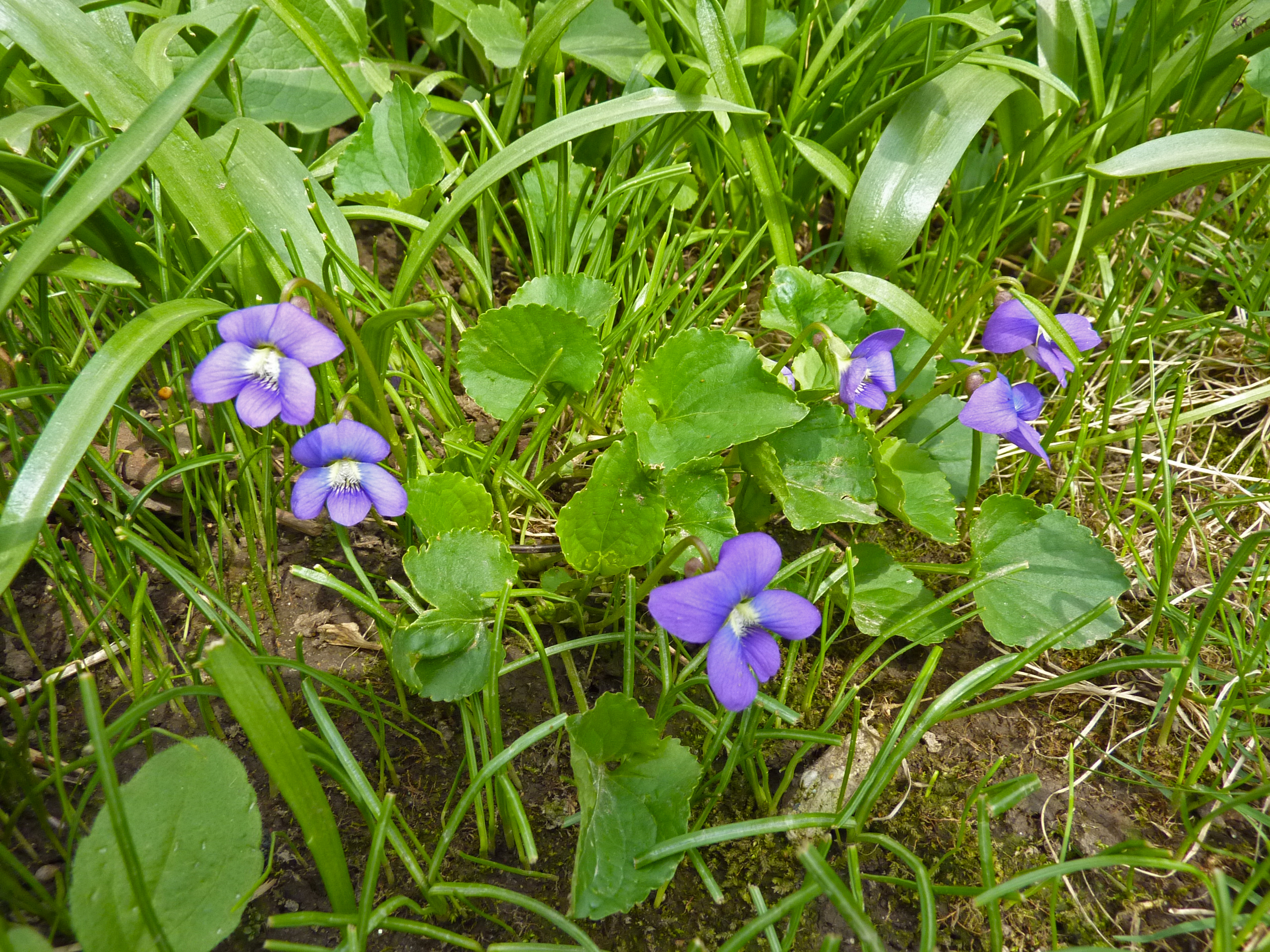

Conservation status
- Secure (NatureServe)

Scientific classification
- Kingdom: Plantae
- Clade: Tracheophytes
- Clade: Angiosperms
- Clade: Eudicots
- Clade: Rosids
- Order: Malpighiales
- Family: Violaceae
- Genus: Viola
- Species: V. sororia

Binomial name
- Viola sororia Willd.

Synonyms
- Viola affinis Leconte; Viola chalcosperma Brainerd; Viola floridana Brainerd; Viola latiuscula Greene; Viola palmata var. sororia (Willd.) Pollard; Viola papilionacea Pursh; Viola priceana Pollard; Viola rosacea Brainerd; Viola septentrionalis Greene; Viola wilmattiae Pollard & Cockerell

= Viola sororia =

Species of flowering plant

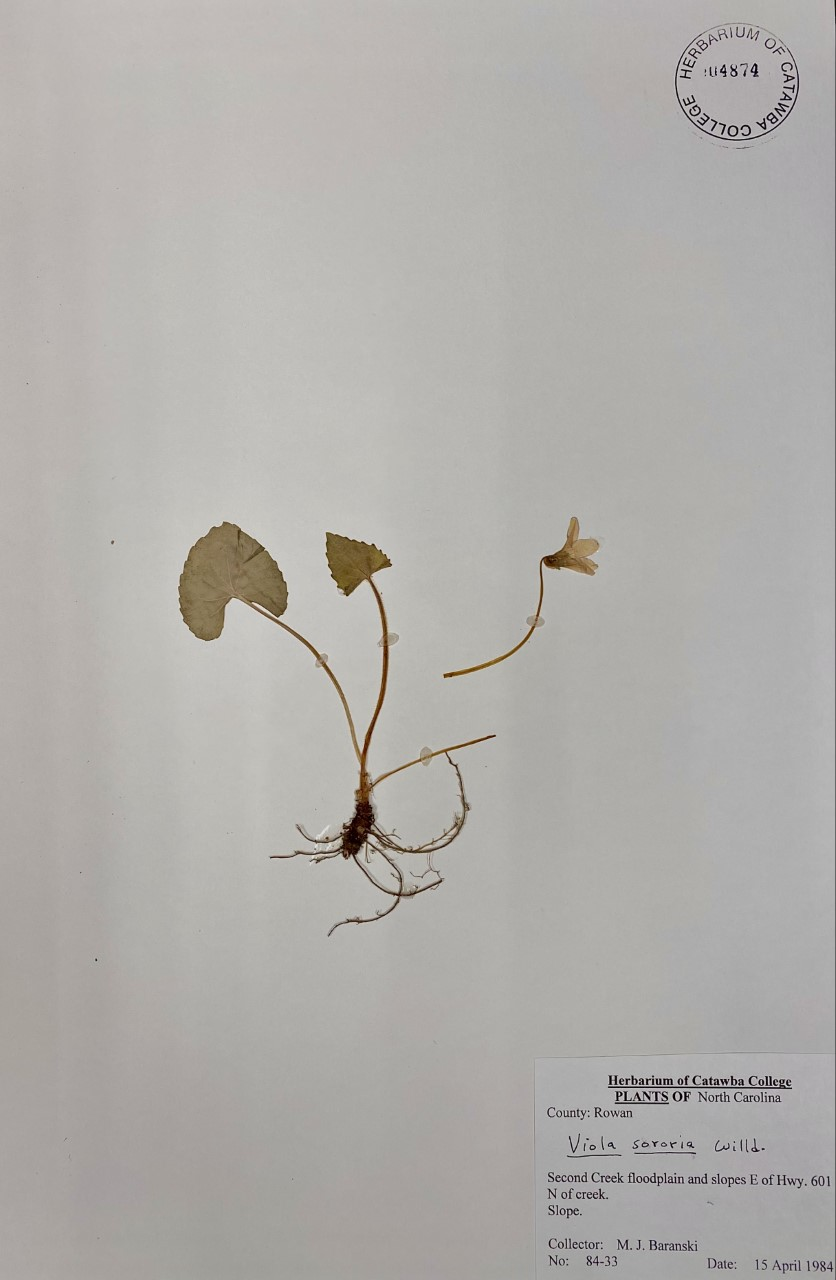
Viola sororia herbarium specimen

Viola sororia (/vaɪˈoʊlə səˈrɔːriə/ vy-OH-lə sə-ROR-ee-ə), known commonly as the common blue violet, is a short-stemmed herbaceous perennial plant native to eastern North America. It is known by a number of common names, including common meadow violet, purple violet, woolly blue violet, hooded violet, and wood violet.

This perennial plant is distributed in the eastern half of the United States, Canada, and a part of eastern Mexico. Its native habitats are rich, moist woods, and swamps located in the eastern half of the United States and Canada. Its cultivar 'Albiflora' has gained the Royal Horticultural Society's Award of Garden Merit.

Self-seeding freely in lawns and gardens, it can be considered a weed by some. Cleistogamous seed heads may also appear on short stems in late summer and early autumn.

== Description ==
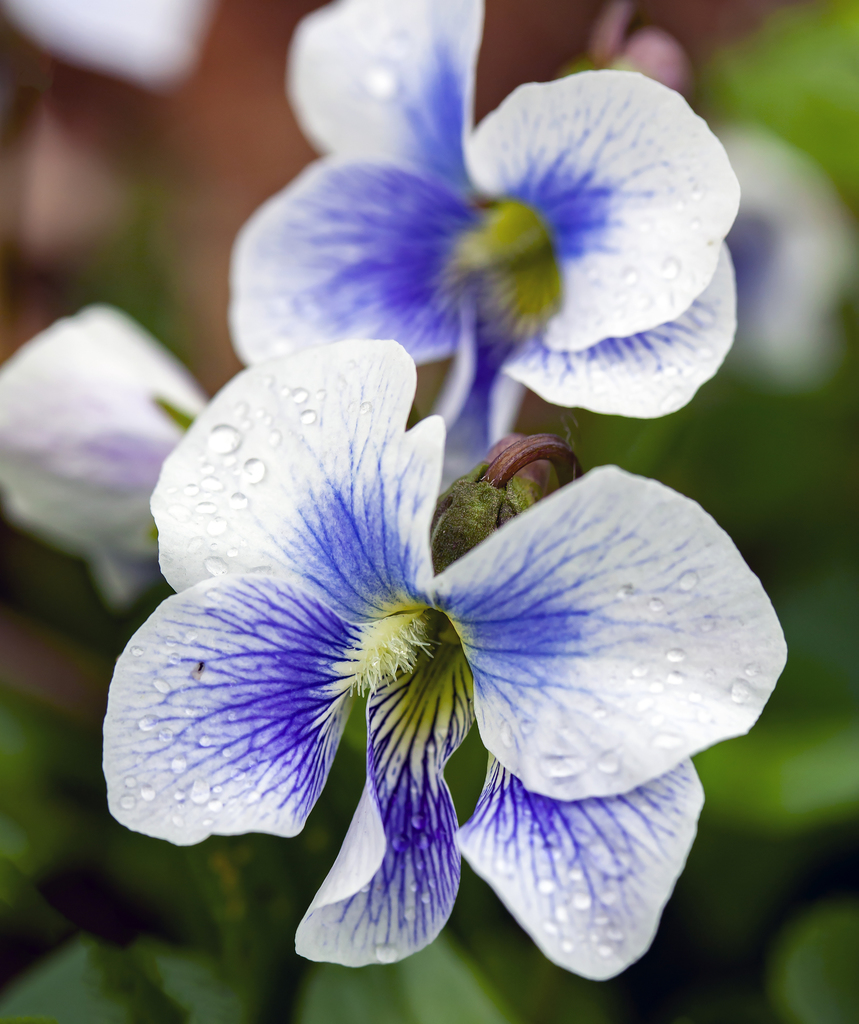
Common Blue Violet (Viola sororia) color variant

Viola sororia is a short-stemmed, herbaceous perennial plant that grows in well-drained and shady habitats. This 15–25 centimeters (6–10 in) wide violet has glossy, heart-shaped leaves and are topped with purple flowers with white throats. The lower three petals are hairy and the stem of the flower droops slightly. These flowers can be found in the woods, thickets, and near stream beds. V. sororia can live and reproduce for more than 10 years. Blooming in the spring and summer (April–August), Viola sororia can be found in colors of white, blue, or purple.

== Taxonomy ==
Hairless common blue violets with purple flowers and bearded spurred petals have been variously called Viola sororia, Viola affinis, and Viola pratincola. In the Chicago region, this hairless form is most frequently found in weedy areas such as old fields and lawns. Hairy purple violets with blue flowers have been called "true" Viola sororia and are rarely seen outside of remnant wooded areas.

A form with white flowers that have a purple center has been called Viola sororia f. priceana (Confederate violet).

Viola sororia has several named hybrids:

- Viola × bernardii (Viola pedatifida var. pedatifida × V. sororia)
- Viola × bissellii (Viola cucullata × V. sororia)
- Viola × cordifolia (Viola hirsutula × V. sororia)
- Viola × conjugens (Viola sagittata var. sagittata × V. sororia)
- Viola × insolita (Viola pedatifida var. brittoniana × V. sororia)

== Distribution and habitat ==
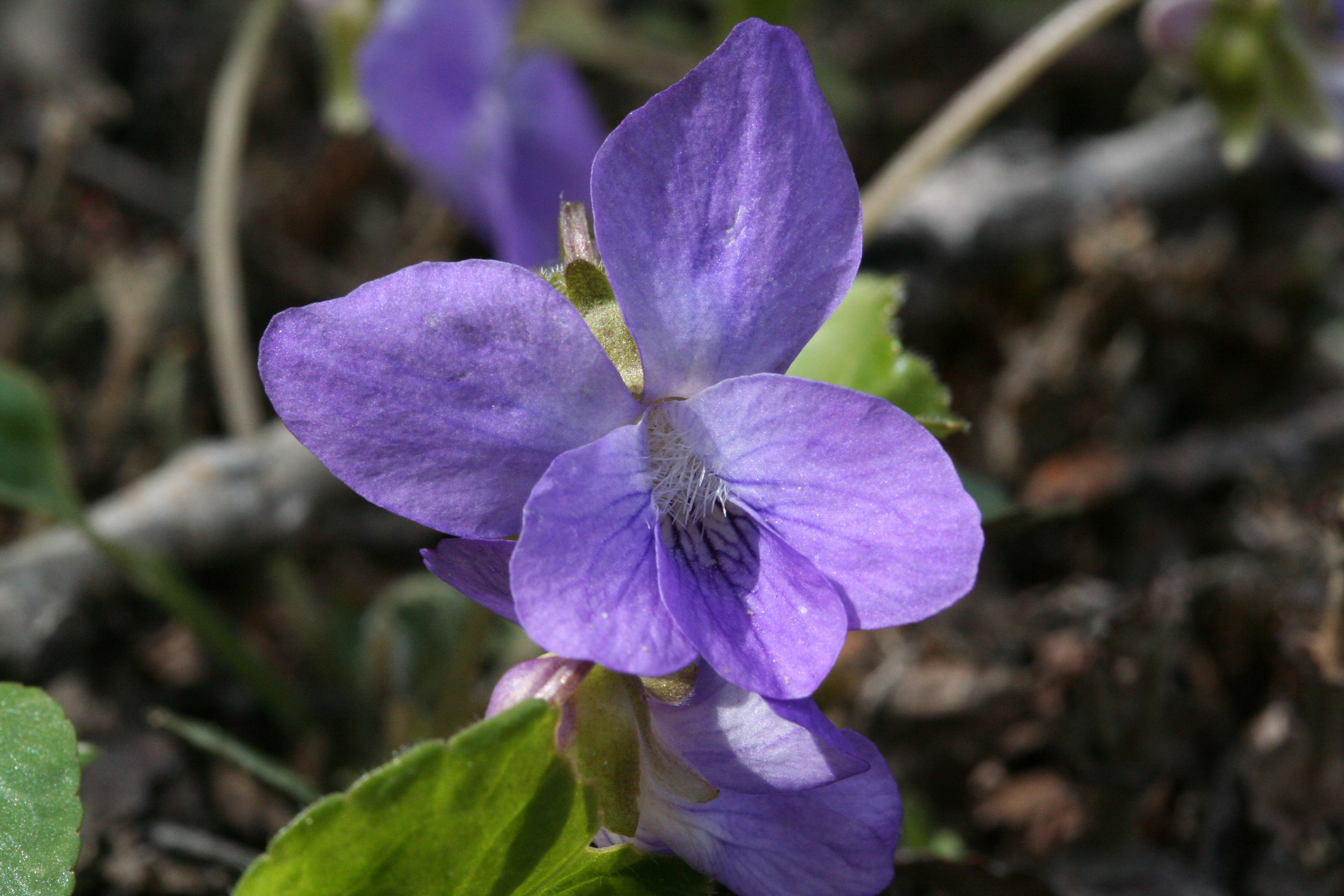
Viola septentrionalis, Sainte-Geneviève-de-Batiscan, Quebec, Canada

Viola sororia is found primarily in forests and is interfertile, meaning it is likely and able to breed with other closely related Viola species. The species grows on forest floors and can adapt to sunny or partly shady conditions. The leaves develop in the early spring when the surrounding tree crowns are not fully closed. When the forest canopy closes, the leaves continue to grow and develop. Soils preferred by V. sororia are moist, rich, and well drained.

== Ecology ==
Fritillary butterfly caterpillars, such as the great spangled fritillary and variegated fritillary, are dependent on these and other plants in genus Viola. The plants serve as food for wild turkeys, rabbits, deer, livestock, the mourning dove, the bobwhite, and the white-footed mouse.

Native bees such as the mason bees, sweat bees, and the violet specialist mining bee, visit the Viola sororia plant for its nectar in the spring. Butterflies are also known to pollinate the species. These pollinated flowers result in a normal seed distribution like most flowering plants; however, Viola sororia produces seeds in the late summer from a process called cleistogamy. This means that it self-fertilizes inside the plant, without opening. The seed capsules eventually turn upright, open, and shoot out their seeds as far as 2.7 meters (9 ft) away from the plant.

Violets employ myrmecochory, which is the process of seed dispersal by ants. The seeds are coated with ant-attracting protein- and lipid-rich morsels, also known as elaiosomes. The ants then gather the seeds and take them back to their nests. When the coating is consumed by the ants, the seed is discarded into their waste piles and can germinate. V. sororia has no known toxicities. It has a low fire tolerance, and has no serious insect or disease problems. Its foliage usually declines in hot summers.

== Uses ==
Beyond its use as a common lawn and garden plant, Viola sororia has historically been used for food and for medicine. Hildegard of Bingen proposed using it as a treatment for depression. The English herbalist, John Gerard, described applications for violet as, "It has power to ease inflammation, roughness of the throat and comforteth the heart, assumageth the pains of the head, and causeth sleep." The flowers and leaves are edible, but the roots are not edible. The Cherokee have used it to treat colds and headaches. Rafinesque, in his Medical Flora, a Manual of the Medical Botany of the United States of North America (1828–1830), wrote of Viola sororia being used by his American contemporaries for coughs, sore throats, and constipation.

Viola sororia can be used to decorate walkways and park areas. It is used as a wildflower in lawns, though some consider Viola sororia a weed despite its being a resource for pollinators and importance as host plant to various fritillary butterflies, including the greater fritillaries in genus Speyeria.

Viola sororia is high in vitamins A and C. The young leaves and flower buds can be eaten raw or cooked, or brewed for a tea. It may also work as an anti-inflammatory and has been used topically for skin conditions. Viola sororia is deer-resistant.

== Toxicity ==
Viola sororia leaves and flowers are edible in moderation and also safe to plant around pets.

== Cultural significance ==
V. sororia is the state flower of Illinois, Rhode Island, New Jersey, and Wisconsin. The genus Viola is known as a symbol of love and modesty by poets such as Sappho, William Shakespeare, and Christina Rossetti. A French play that achieved popularity on Broadway in the late 1920s, The Captive, featured a lesbian character who won over her love interests with violets. This inspired a violet fad among the play's supporters, and possibly a violet boycott among its detractors. It is the reason the violet is sometimes called "the lesbian flower".

== Gallery ==
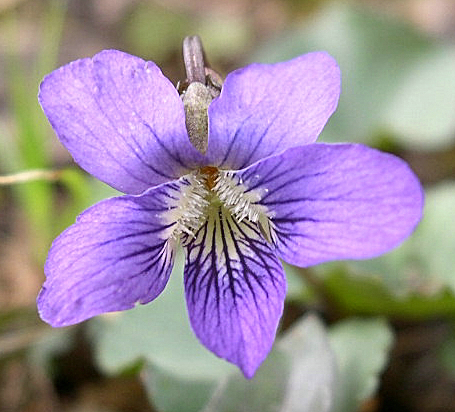
Flower

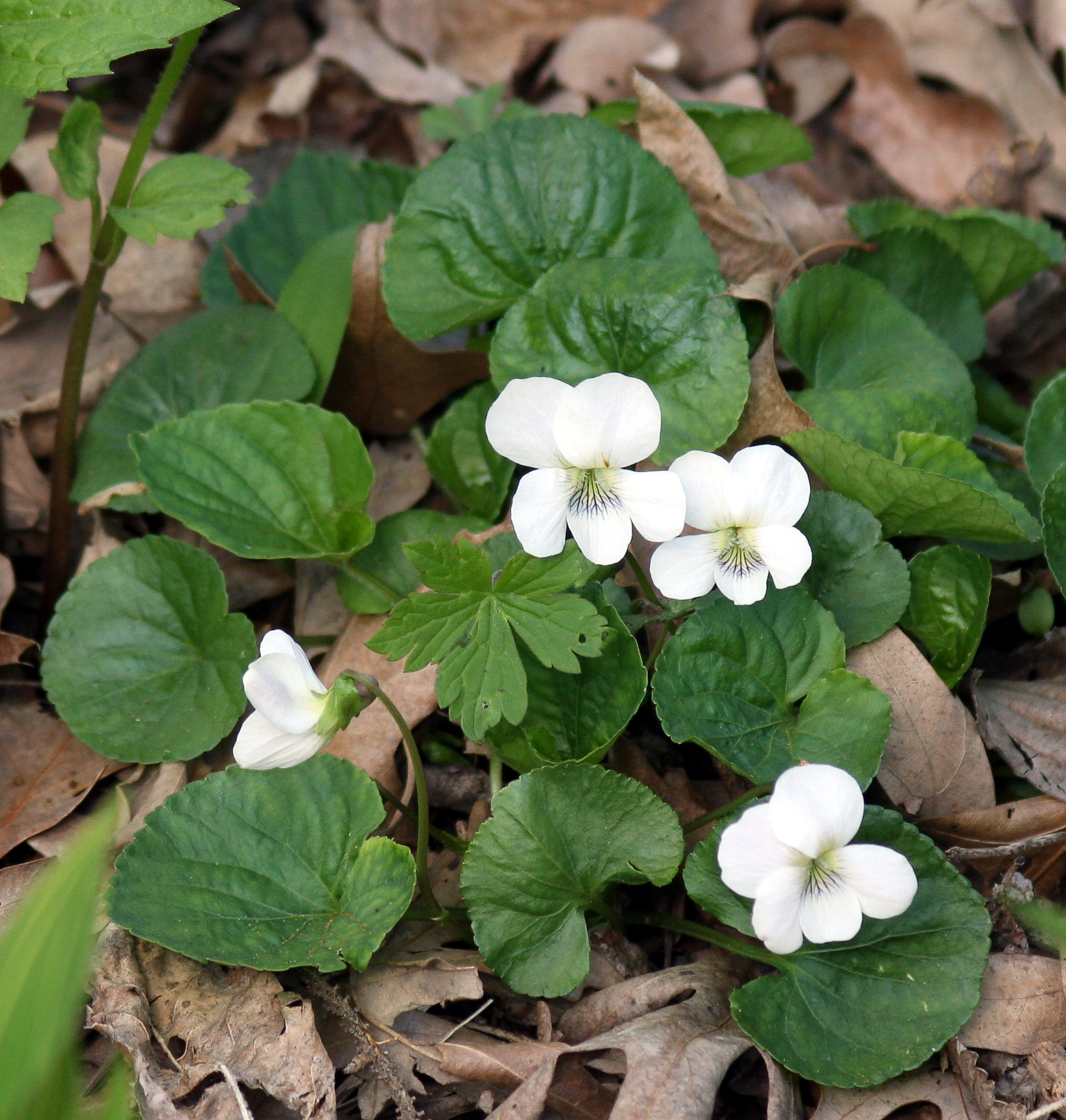
White flowering form

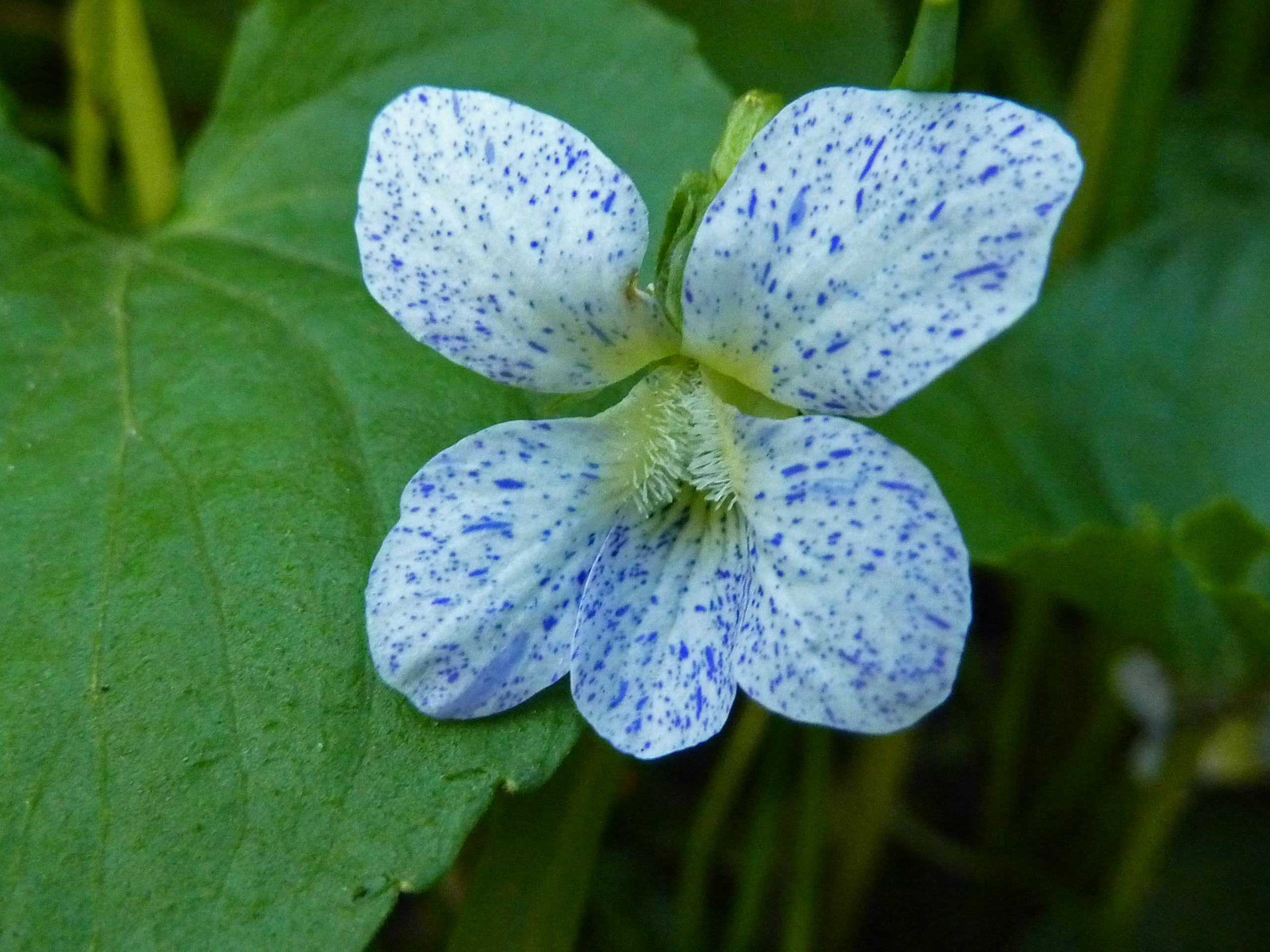
V. sororia 'Freckles'

== Bibliography ==
- WFO (2019). "Viola L." World Flora Online.
- POTWO. "Viola L." Plants of the World Online. Royal Botanic Gardens, Kew.
- "Connecticut Plants", Connecticut Botanical Society, archived from the original on 2021-01-01
- Viola sororia from the Virginia Tech Weed Identification Guide
- Duke, James. 1992. Handbook of Edible Weeds. CRC Press, Boca Raton, Florida.
- Viola sororia: University of Wisconsin-La Crosse
