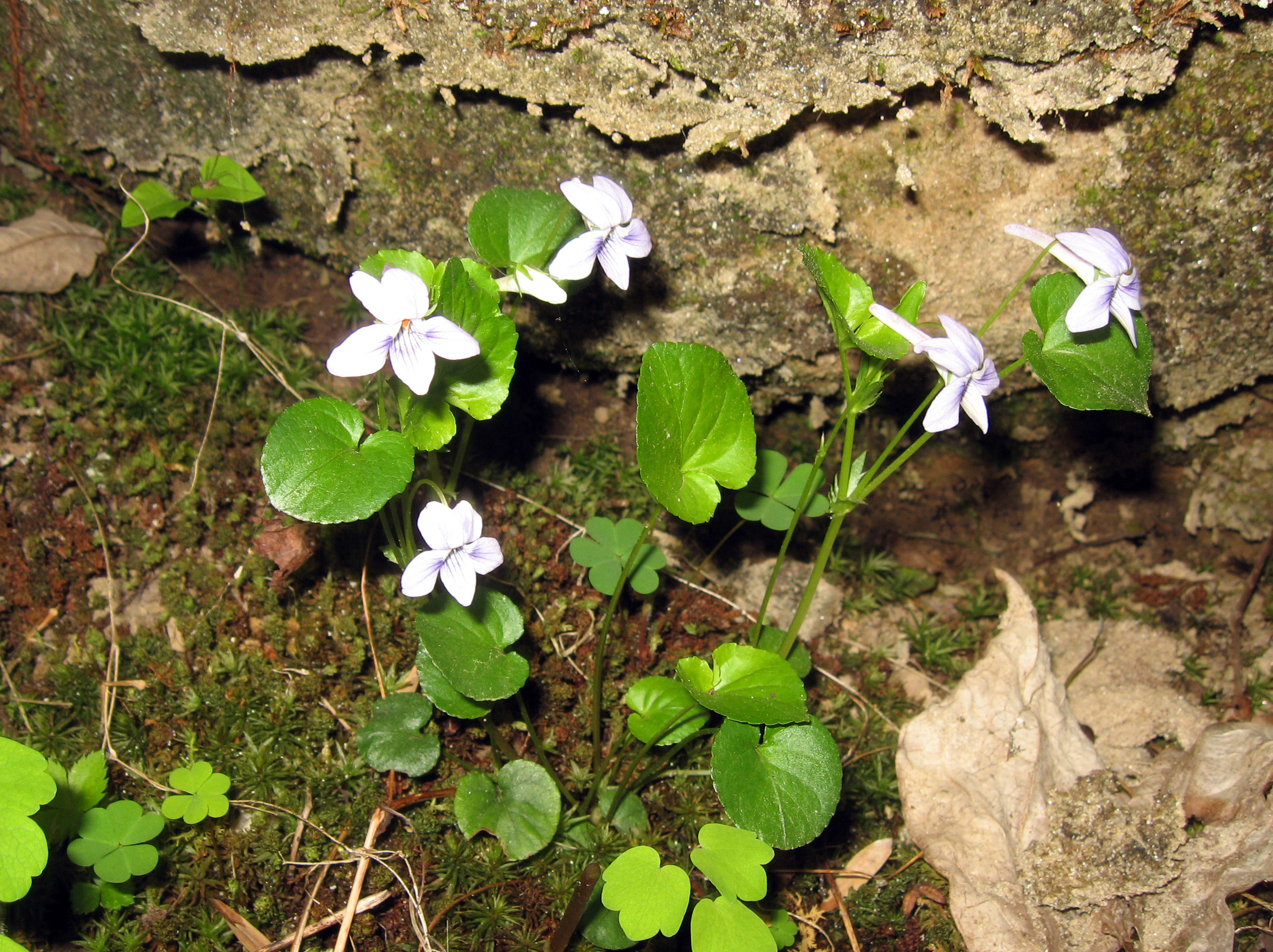

Scientific classification
- Kingdom: Plantae
- Clade: Tracheophytes
- Clade: Angiosperms
- Clade: Eudicots
- Clade: Rosids
- Order: Malpighiales
- Family: Violaceae
- Genus: Viola
- Species: V. rostrata

Binomial name
- Viola rostrata Pursh

= Viola rostrata =

Species of flowering plant

Viola rostrata, commonly called the long-spurred violet, is an herbaceous plant in the violet family (Violaceae). It is native to eastern North America, where it is found in Canada and the United States, primarily in the Northeastern, Midwestern, and Appalachian regions. Its natural habitat is acidic mesic forests, often growing near Tsuga canadensis.

== Description ==
It is a stemmed perennial plant. The cauline leaves are simple, toothed, ovate and acute. Basal leaves are cordate and 2–4 cm. It produces flowers in the spring. The flowers are beardless, pale lilac with darker veins forming a darker centre eye. The spur is at least as long as the petal blades.

V. rostrata can be distinguished from other Viola by its long spur

== Hybrids ==
Viola rostrata is known to hybridize with Viola conspersa (American dog-violet) and Viola striata (creamy violet).
