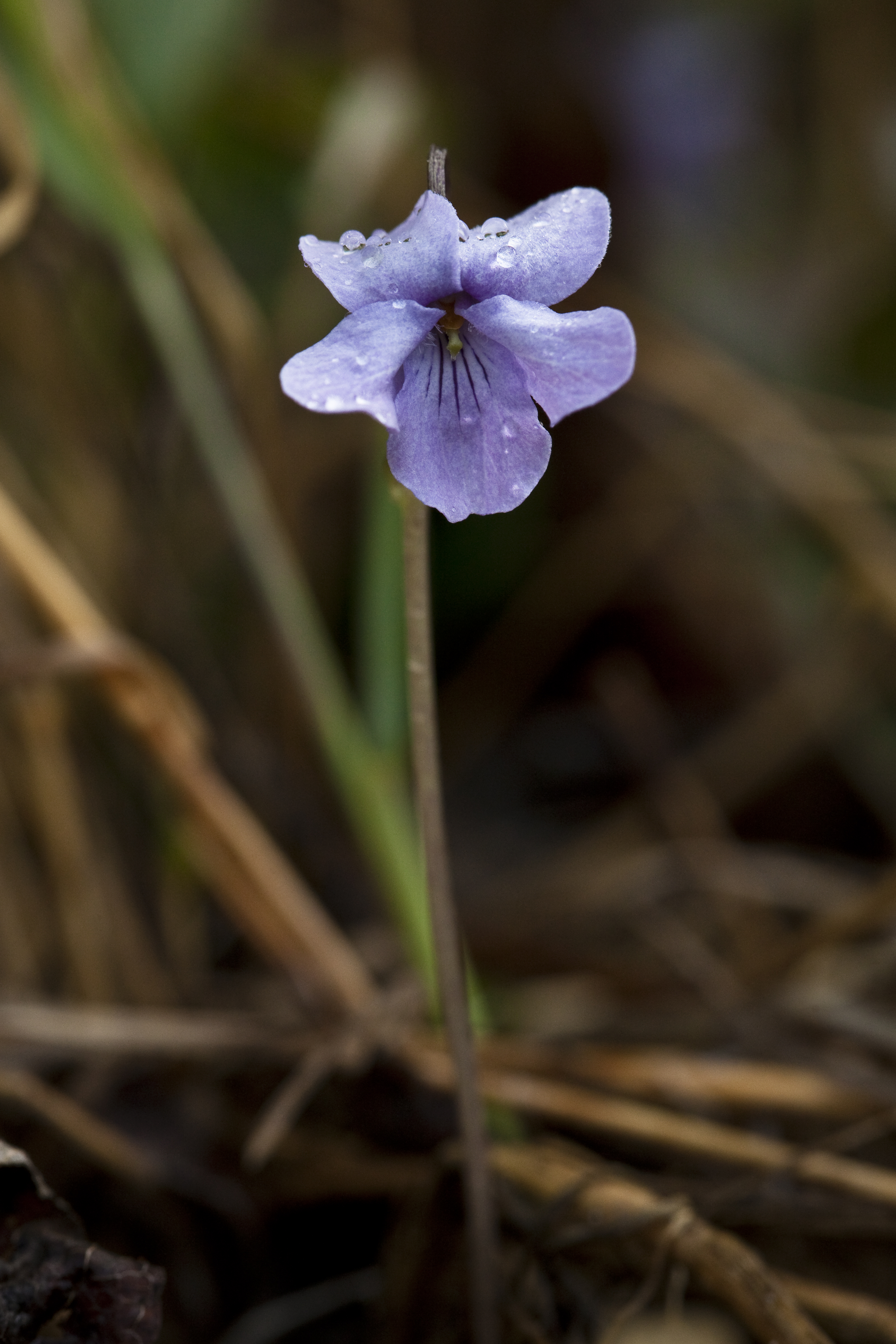

Scientific classification
- Kingdom: Plantae
- Clade: Tracheophytes
- Clade: Angiosperms
- Clade: Eudicots
- Clade: Rosids
- Order: Malpighiales
- Family: Violaceae
- Genus: Viola
- Species: V. langsdorffii

Binomial name
- Viola langsdorffii Fisch. ex Gingins

Synonyms
- Viola simulata; Viola superba

= Viola langsdorffii =

Species of flowering plant

Viola langsdorffii is a species of Viola. Commonly known as Alaskan violet and Aleutian violet, it is a plant from rather stout creeping rootstocks, glabrous, the stems ascending 5–30 cm long. V. langsdorffii has leaves that are long-petioled, round-cordate, and anywhere from 2.5 to 4 cm broad, crenate; stipules foliaceous, lanceolate, the lower usually incised. The flowers are pale violet, with petals 12–16 mm long, the three lower white at base, the lateral pair bearded; spur very short and stout, as broad as long; the head of styles not bearded. Alaskan and Aleutian specimens, with petals 20 mm long, are more robust than specimens from further south in it range.

== Range ==
Viola langsdorffii is usually found near the coast in Boreal and Humid Transition Zones, Aleutian Islands to central Oregon, where it extends inland to Marion County. V. langsdorffii typically grows in moist places at low to high elevations. Its native habitats include bogs, moist meadows, stream banks, and snow beds.
