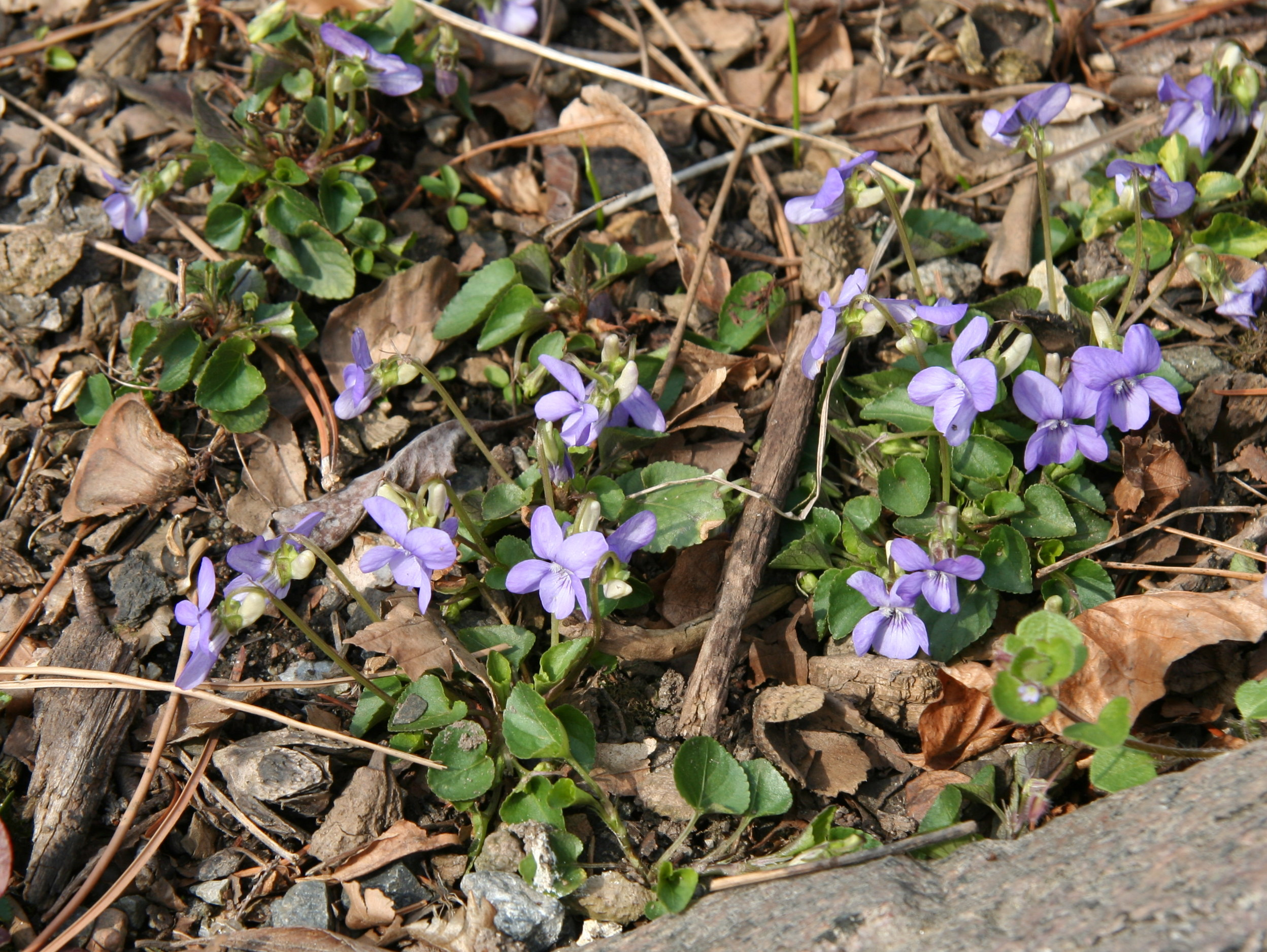
- In bloom
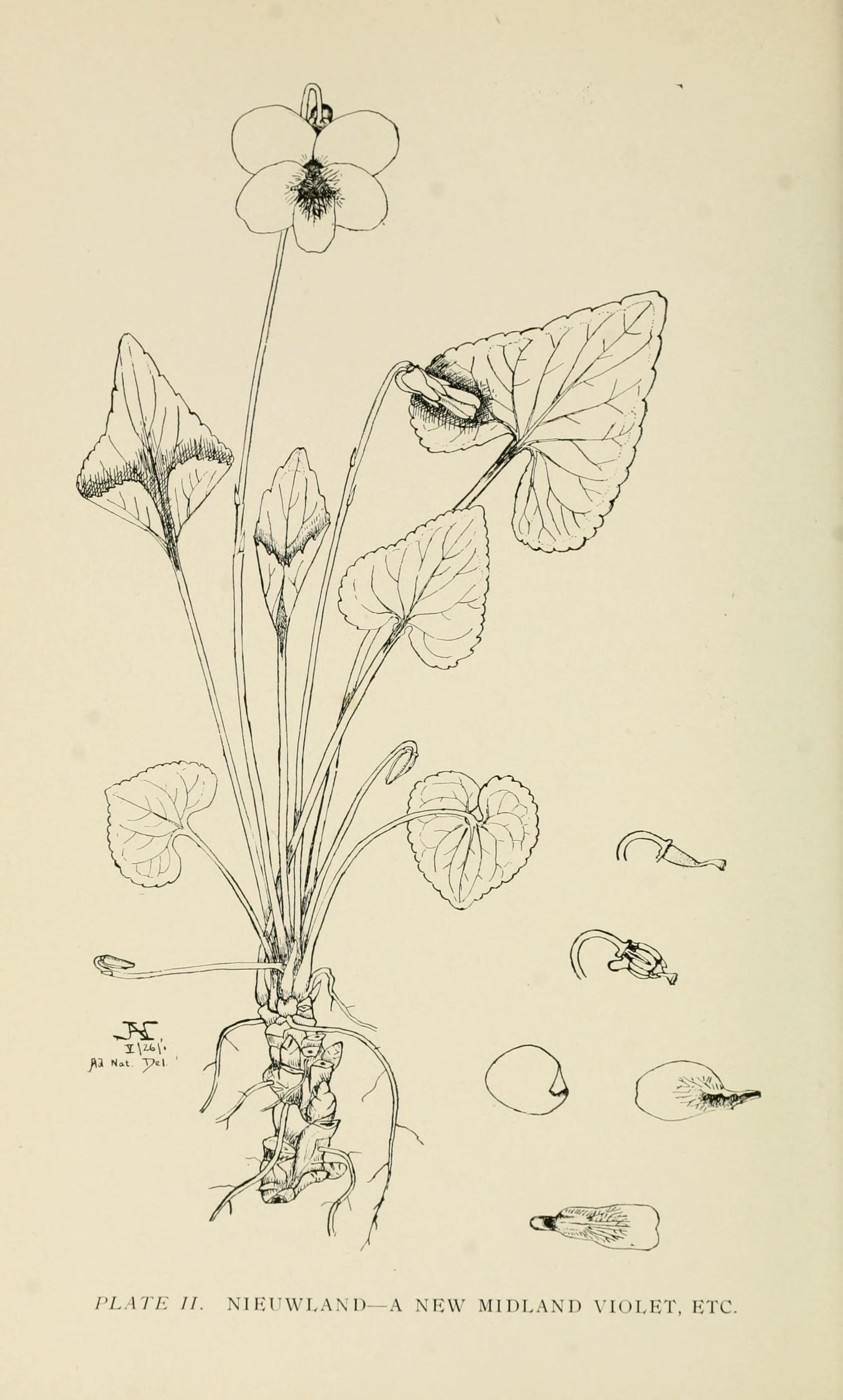
- Botanical illustration

Scientific classification
- Kingdom: Plantae
- Clade: Tracheophytes
- Clade: Angiosperms
- Clade: Eudicots
- Clade: Rosids
- Order: Malpighiales
- Family: Violaceae
- Genus: Viola
- Species: V. missouriensis

Binomial name
- Viola missouriensis Greene

Synonyms
- Viola candidula Nieuwl.; Viola illinoensis Greene; Viola lucidifolia Newbro; Viola securigera Greene; Viola sororia var. missouriensis (Greene) L.E.McKinney

= Viola missouriensis =

Species of plant

Viola missouriensis, the Missouri violet, is a species of flowering plant in the family Violaceae, native to the central United States. An annual or perennial plant, it can reach up to 15 cm (6 in), and have lavender, purple, or (occasionally) white flowers.

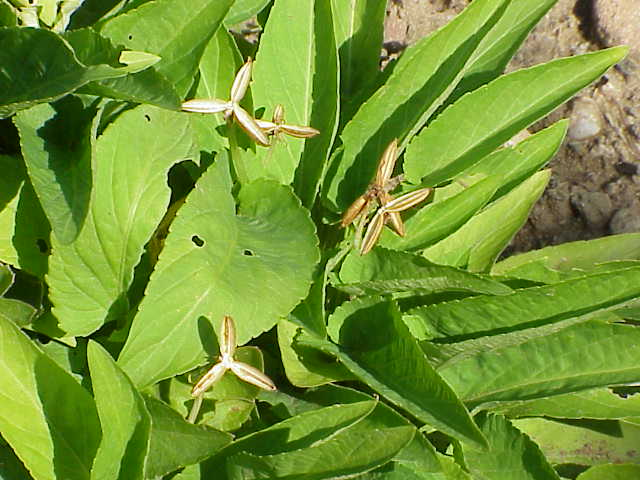
Foliage

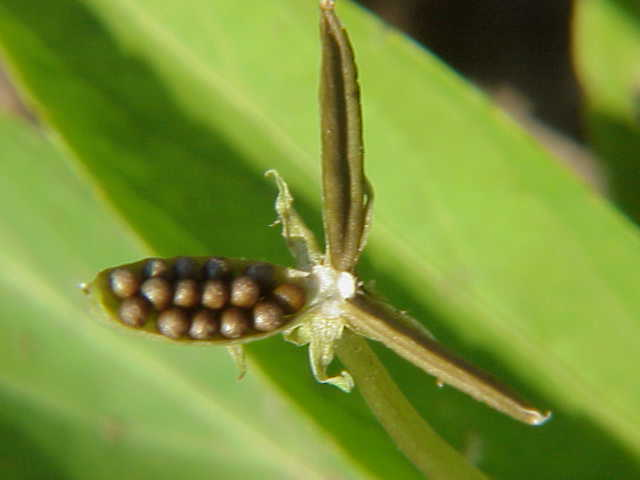
Seed capsule
