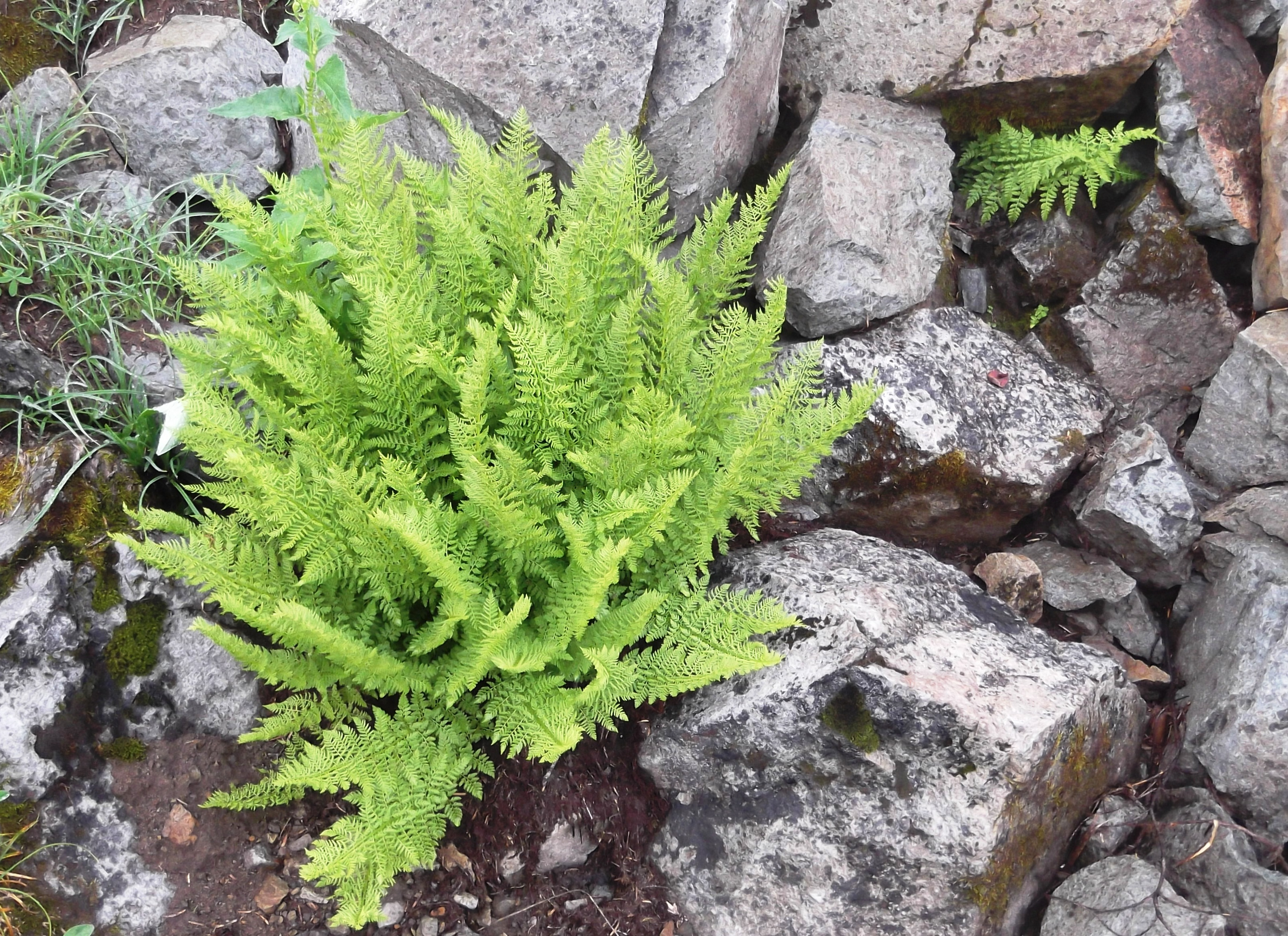
- On the slopes of Naches Peak, Washington state
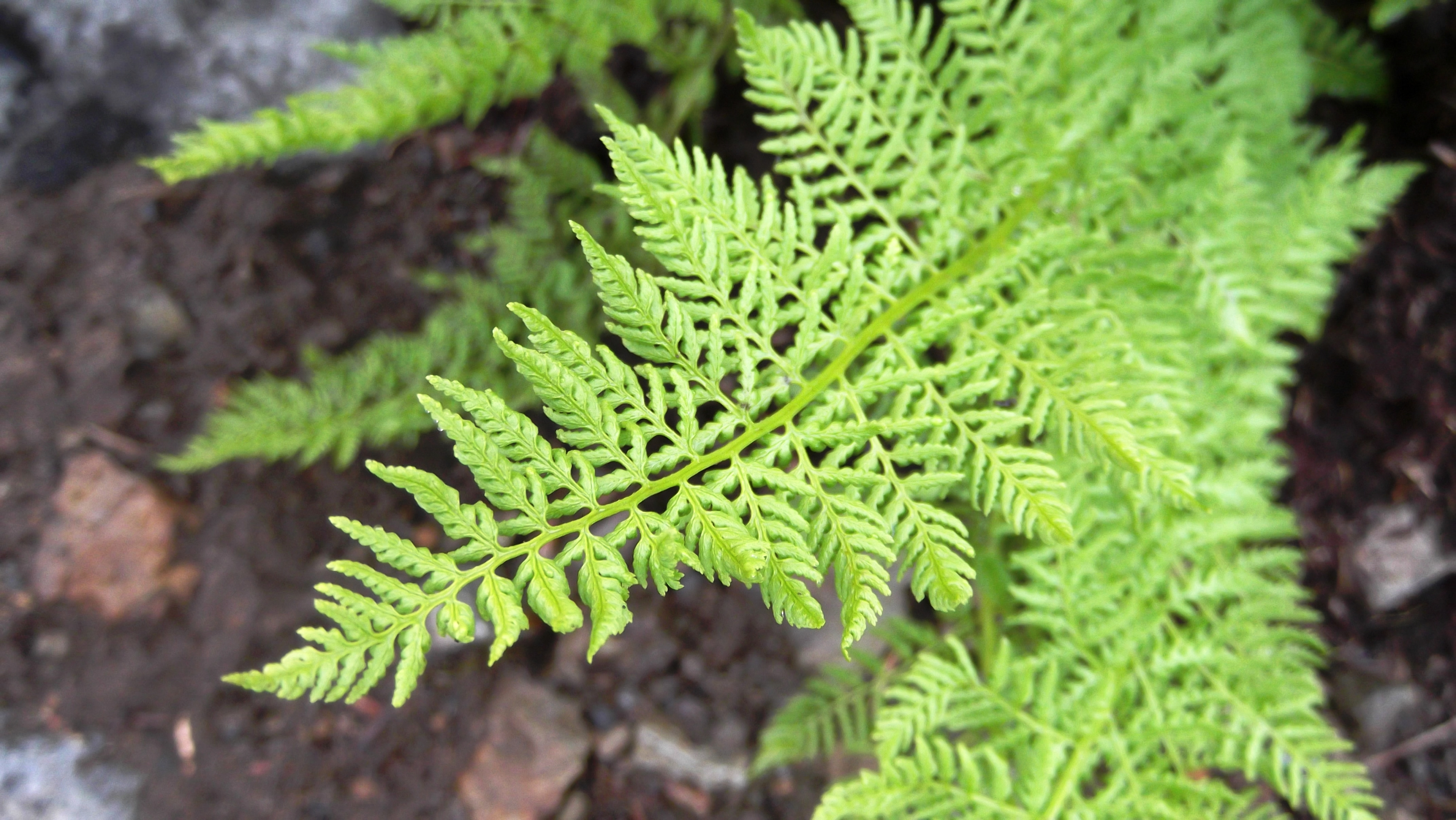
- Close-up of frond

Conservation status
- Apparently Secure (NatureServe)

Scientific classification
- Kingdom: Plantae
- Clade: Tracheophytes
- Division: Polypodiophyta
- Class: Polypodiopsida
- Order: Polypodiales
- Suborder: Aspleniineae
- Family: Athyriaceae
- Genus: Athyrium
- Species: A. americanum

Binomial name
- Athyrium americanum (Butters) Maxon

Synonyms
- List: Athyrium alpestre var. americanum Butters; Athyrium alpestre subsp. americanum (Butters) Lellinger; Athyrium alpestre var. gaspense Fernald; Athyrium alpestre var. typicum Fernald; Athyrium distentifolium subsp. americanum (Butters) Hultén; Athyrium distentifolium var. americanum (Butters) B.Boivin; Phegopteris alpestris var. americana (Butters) Jeps.; Phegopteris rhaetica var. americana (Butters) Farw.

= Athyrium americanum =

Species of fern

Athyrium americanum, the American alpine lady fern, is a species of fern in the family Aspleniaceae. It is native to the Russian Far East, subarctic North America, and the west to west-central United States. It occurs at higher altitudes and latitudes than Athyrium filix-femina, the common lady fern.
