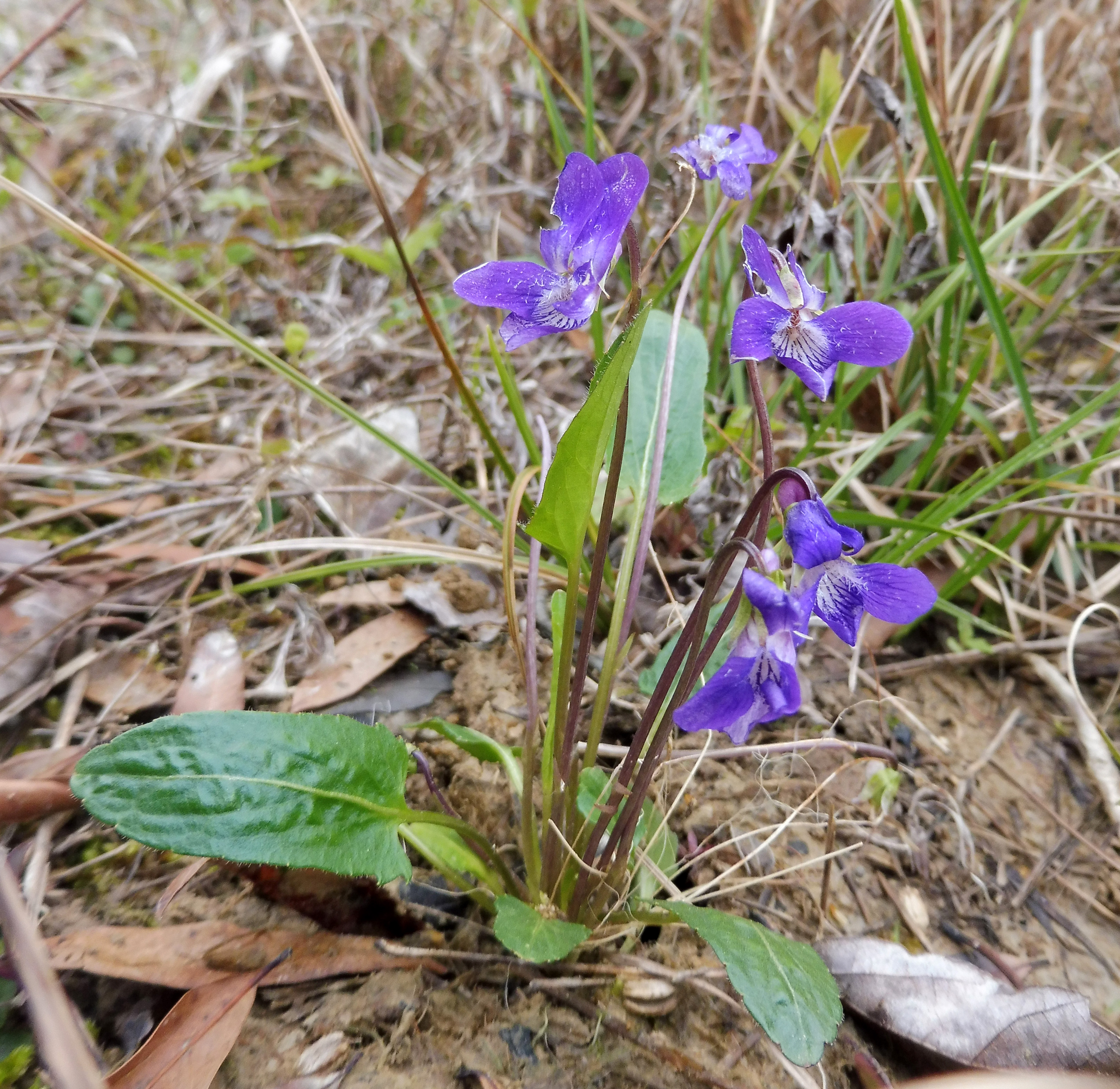

Scientific classification
- Kingdom: Plantae
- Clade: Tracheophytes
- Clade: Angiosperms
- Clade: Eudicots
- Clade: Rosids
- Order: Malpighiales
- Family: Violaceae
- Genus: Viola
- Species: V. sagittata

Binomial name
- Viola sagittata Aiton

= Viola sagittata =

Species of flowering plant

Viola sagittata, commonly called the arrowleaf violet or arrow-leaved violet, is a species of flowering plant in the violet family (Violaceae). It is native to the eastern North America in Canada and the United States, where it is widespread. It is found in a variety of natural habitats, but is most common in dry, open communities such as prairies, glades, or woodlands, often in sandy or rocky soil.

Viola sagittata is a stemless perennial. It can be distinguished from other Viola in its area by its leaves that are much longer than wide, with truncate to subcordate bases. It produces purple flowers in the spring.

== Taxonomy ==
Two varieties are currently recognized. They are quite distinct, which has led some taxonomists to consider them to be distinct species. The varieties are:

- V. sagittata var. ovata, northern downy violet – Found primarily in the Appalachian Mountains and Great Lakes area
- V. sagittata var. sagittata – Widespread across eastern North America
