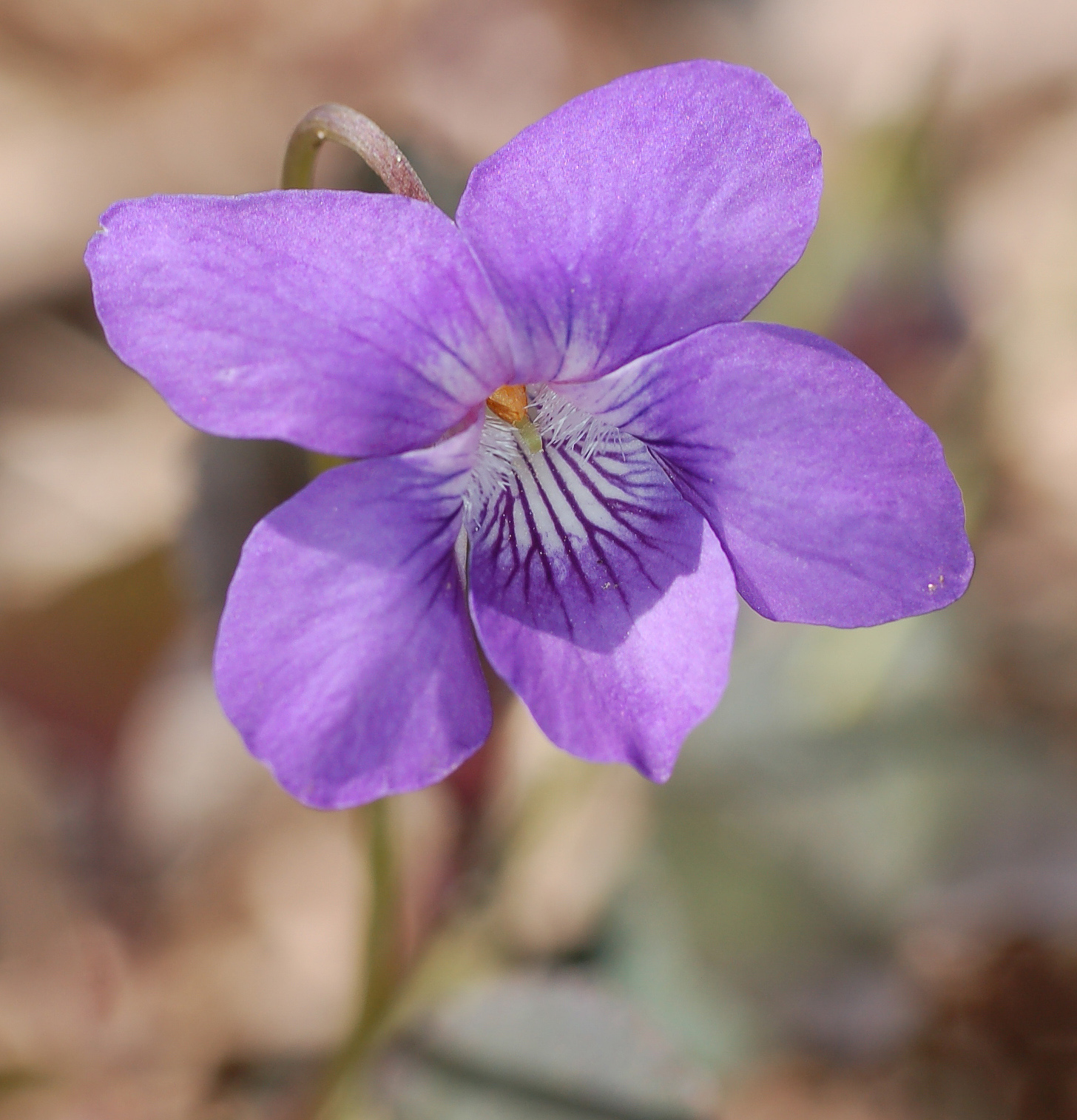

Scientific classification
- Kingdom: Plantae
- Clade: Tracheophytes
- Clade: Angiosperms
- Clade: Eudicots
- Clade: Rosids
- Order: Malpighiales
- Family: Violaceae
- Genus: Viola
- Species: V. labradorica

Binomial name
- Viola labradorica Schrank

Synonyms
- V. conspersa Rchb.

= Viola labradorica =

Species of flowering plant

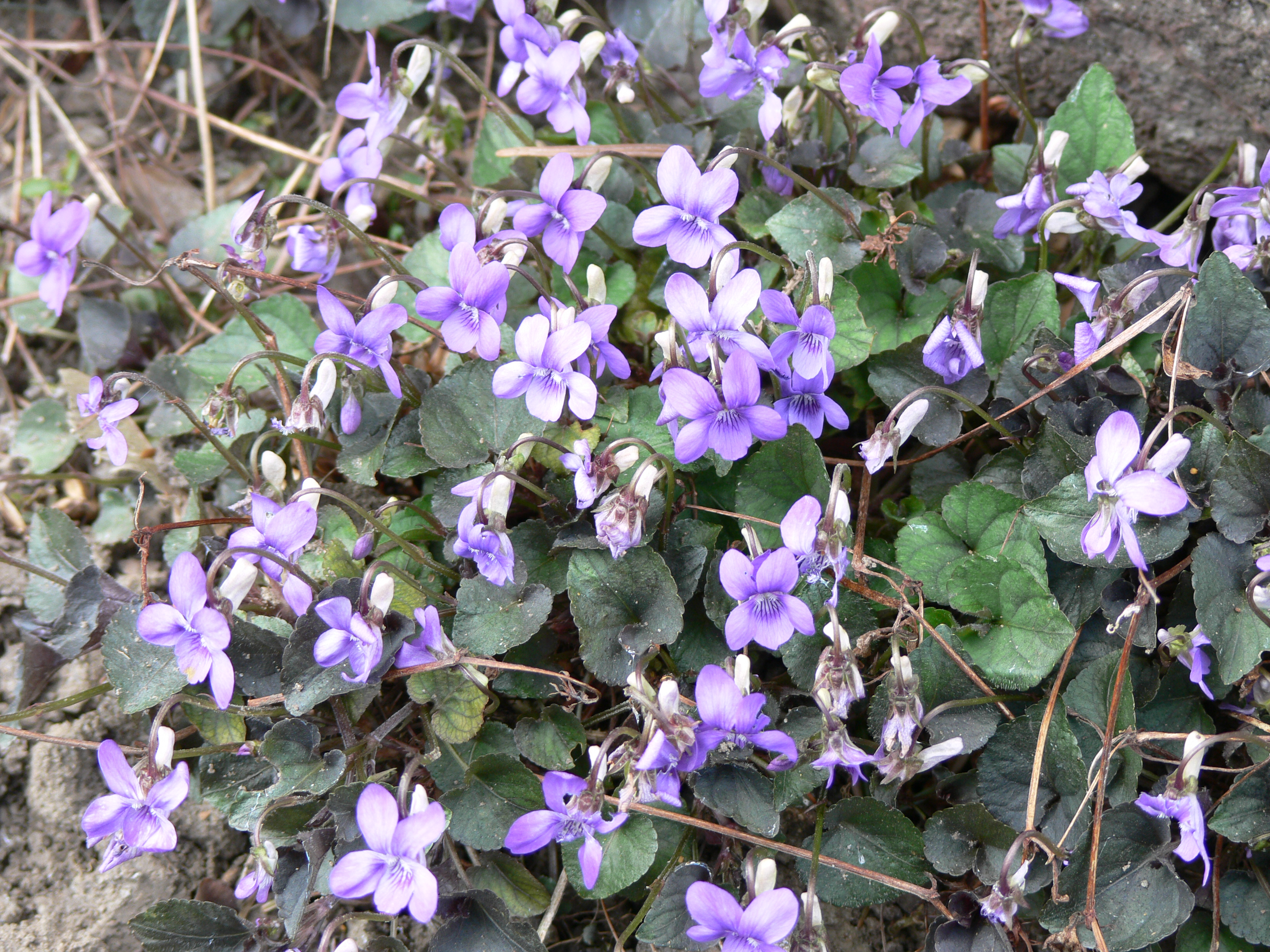
Viola riviniana Purpurea Group mislabeled as Viola labradorica growing in the Botanischer Garten at Krefeld

Viola labradorica, commonly known as alpine violet, American dog violet, dog violet or Labrador violet, is a perennial herbaceous flowering plant. It is native to Greenland, eastern Canada, and the eastern United States. The plant sold as Viola labradorica by nurseries is Viola riviniana.

== Uses ==
=== Culinary ===
Viola labradorica has edible leaves and flowers. However, the leaves are sometimes characterized as "wooly" and thus not as desirable for eating.

== See also ==
- List of Viola species
