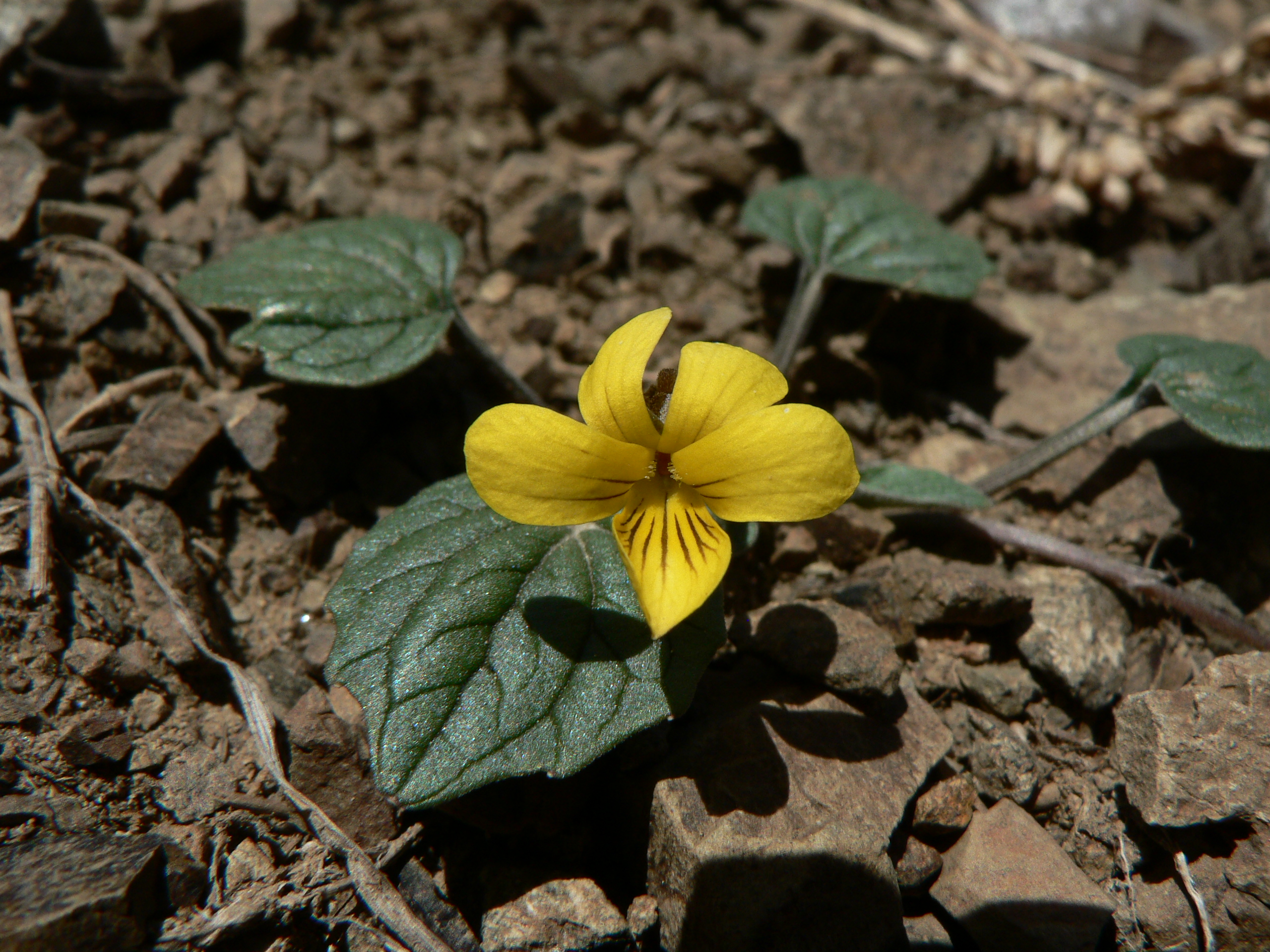

Scientific classification
- Kingdom: Plantae
- Clade: Tracheophytes
- Clade: Angiosperms
- Clade: Eudicots
- Clade: Rosids
- Order: Malpighiales
- Family: Violaceae
- Genus: Viola
- Species: V. purpurea

Binomial name
- Viola purpurea Kellogg

= Viola purpurea =

Species of flowering plant

Viola purpurea is a species of violet with yellow flowers and the common name goosefoot violet.

== Habitat and range ==
Viola purpurea grows in foothills and mountains across much the western United States, including the Cascade Mountains, the coastal ranges and Sierra Nevada in California, and the Rocky Mountains. In the Wenatchee Mountains in Washington State it is notable for being common on serpentine soils.

== Description ==
This is a small plant which bears thick to fleshy toothed or ridged oval leaves which are mostly green but may have a purplish tint to them. The leaves have prominent indented veins. The flowers are made up of bright yellow petals, the lowermost being streaked or veined with purple and the lateral petals with purplish undersides.

== Taxonomy ==
There are several subspecies, most of which are known by the common name goosefoot violet. These subspecies are found across the western United States from Wyoming to California. It is a member of the chaparral plant community and the foothills and low elevation mountains.

=== Infraspecifics ===
The following varieties are recognised:

- Viola purpurea var. aurea (Kellogg) M.S.Baker ex Jeps. – golden violet, bright yellow violet
- Viola purpurea var. dimorpha (M.S.Baker & J.C.Clausen) J.T.Howell
- Viola purpurea var. integrifolia (M.S.Baker & J.C.Clausen) J.T.Howell
- Viola purpurea var. mesophyta (M.S.Baker & J.C.Clausen) J.T.Howell
- Viola purpurea var. mohavensis (M.S.Baker & J.C.Clausen) J.T.Howell
- Viola purpurea var. purpurea Kellogg
- Viola purpurea var. venosa (S.Watson) Brainerd – most widely distributed variety.
