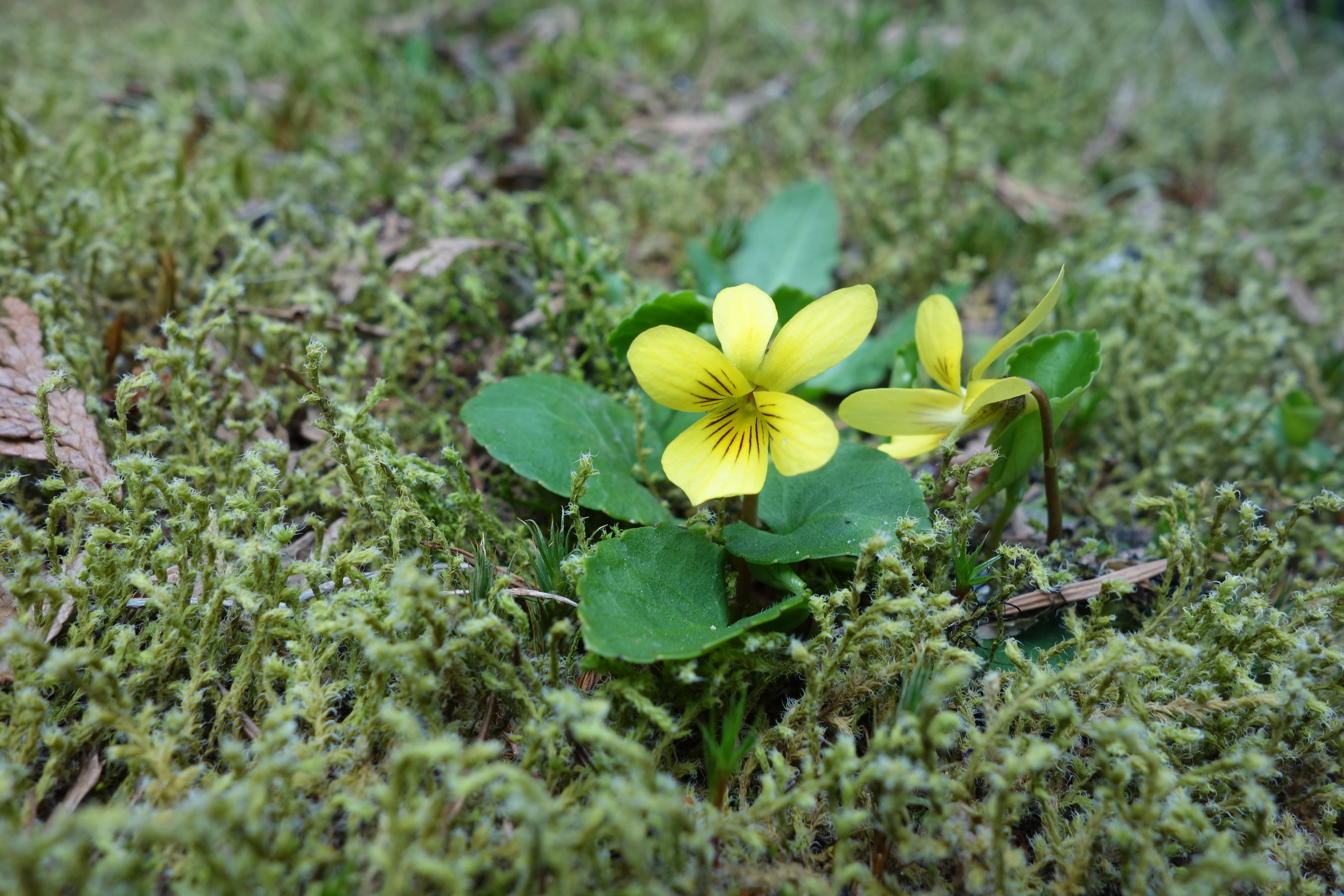
- Habit
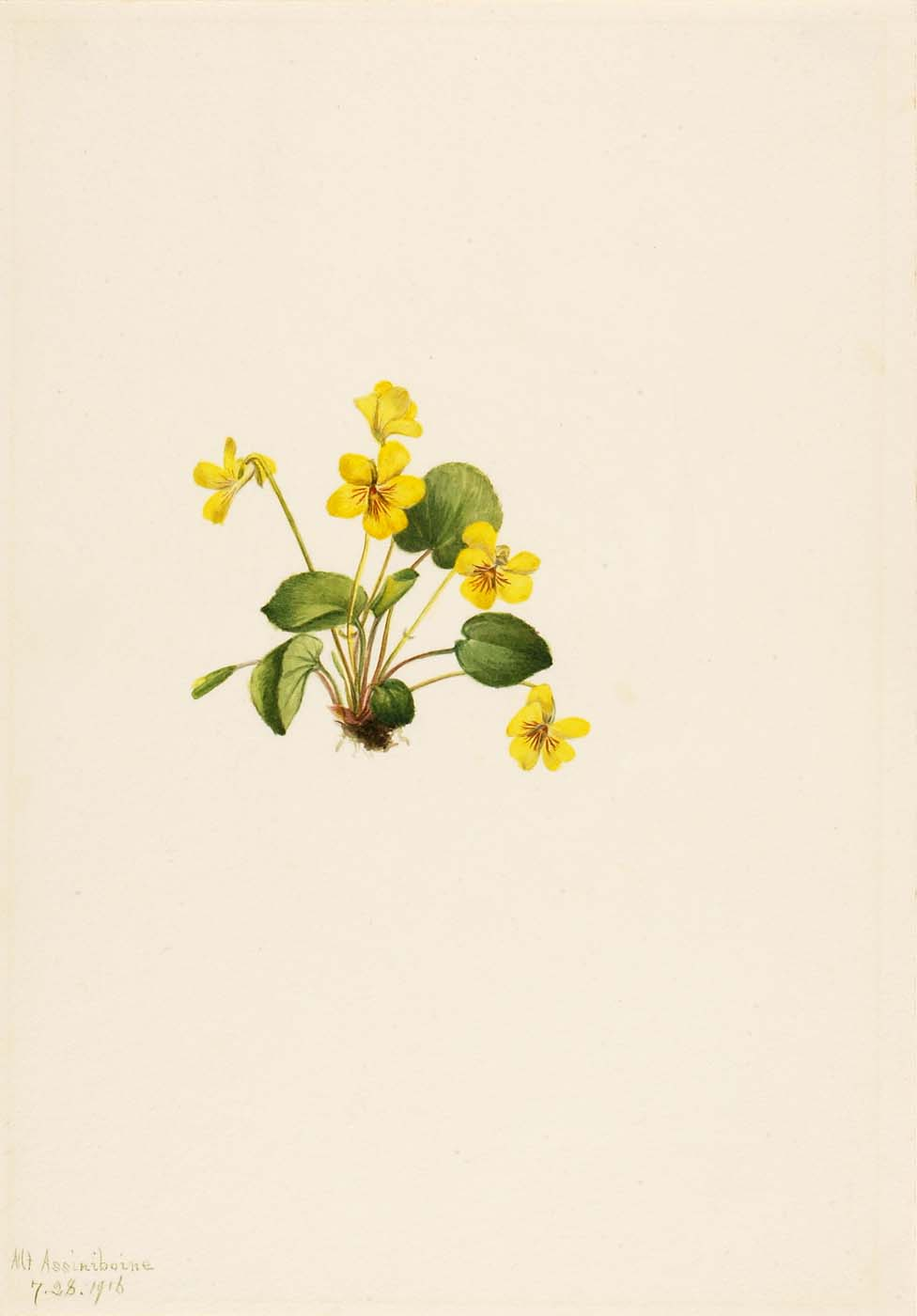
- Botanical illustration by Mary Vaux Walcott

Scientific classification
- Kingdom: Plantae
- Clade: Tracheophytes
- Clade: Angiosperms
- Clade: Eudicots
- Clade: Rosids
- Order: Malpighiales
- Family: Violaceae
- Genus: Viola
- Species: V. orbiculata

Binomial name
- Viola orbiculata (A.Gray) Geyer ex B.D.Jacks.

Synonyms
- Viola sarmentosa var. orbiculata A.Gray; Viola sempervirens var. orbiculata (A.Gray) J.K.Henry; Viola sempervirens subsp. orbiculata (A.Gray) M.S.Baker

= Viola orbiculata =

Species of plant

Viola orbiculata, the darkwoods violet or western roundleaf violet, is a species of flowering plant in the family Violaceae, native to the Pacific Northwest. A perennial reaching 7.5 cm (3 in), it has yellow flowers with purple markings.
