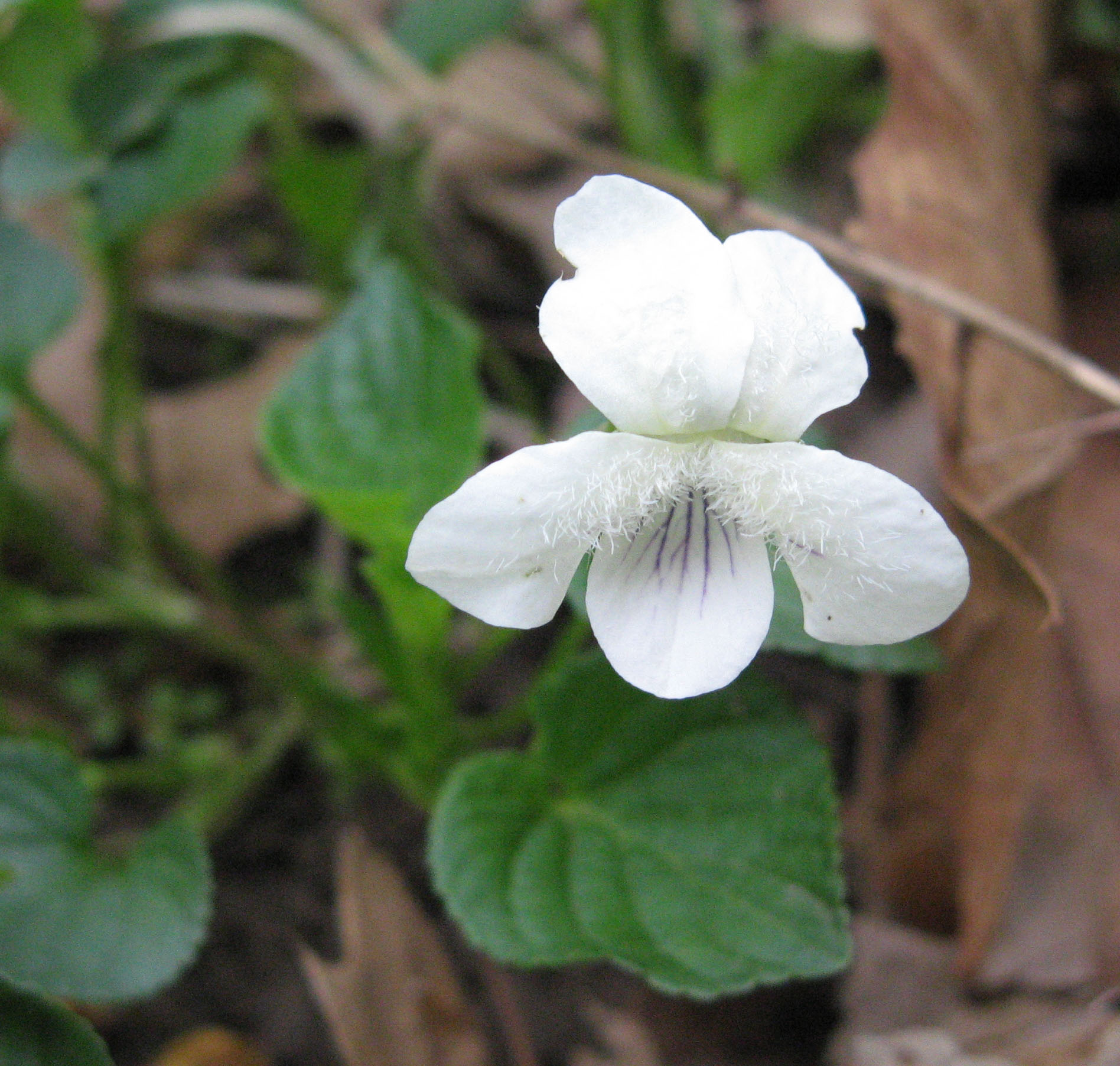

Scientific classification
- Kingdom: Plantae
- Clade: Tracheophytes
- Clade: Angiosperms
- Clade: Eudicots
- Clade: Rosids
- Order: Malpighiales
- Family: Violaceae
- Genus: Viola
- Species: V. striata

Binomial name
- Viola striata Aiton

= Viola striata =

Species of flowering plant

Viola striata is a species of violet known by the common names striped cream violet and creamy violet. It is native to eastern North America, with its distribution being centered in interior areas away from the coastal plain. Its preferred habitat is mesic forests. It is a small, caulescent, perennial herb that has purple-striped white flowers in the spring.

The leaves and blossoms are edible; the latter can be used to make jelly.
