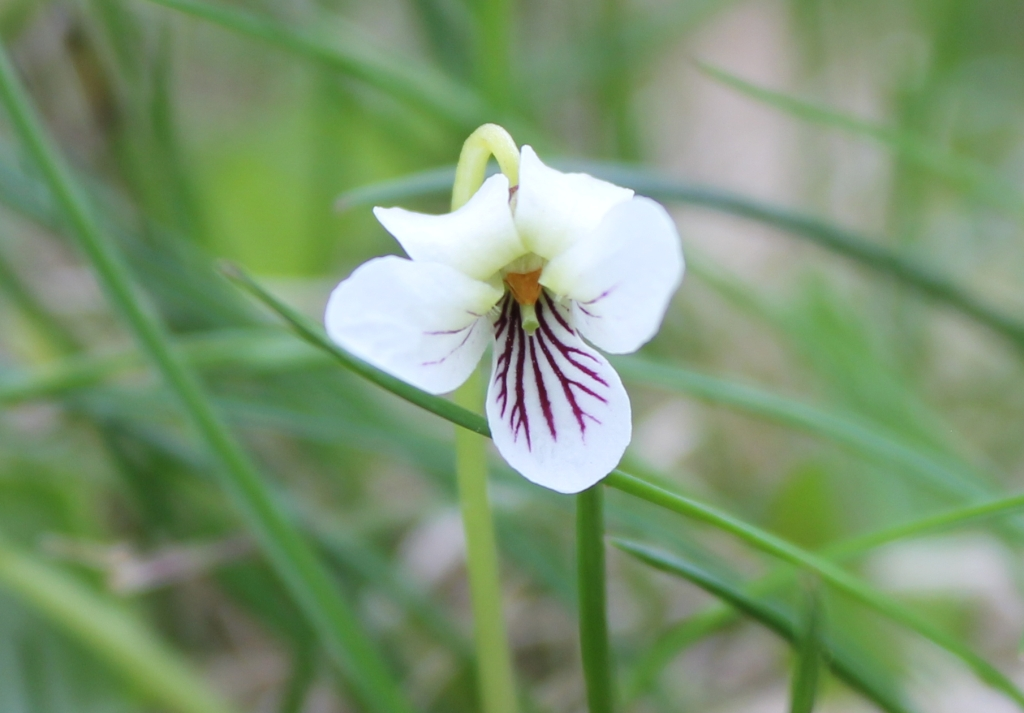

Scientific classification
- Kingdom: Plantae
- Clade: Tracheophytes
- Clade: Angiosperms
- Clade: Eudicots
- Clade: Rosids
- Order: Malpighiales
- Family: Violaceae
- Genus: Viola
- Species: V. macloskeyi

Binomial name
- Viola macloskeyi F.E.Lloyd
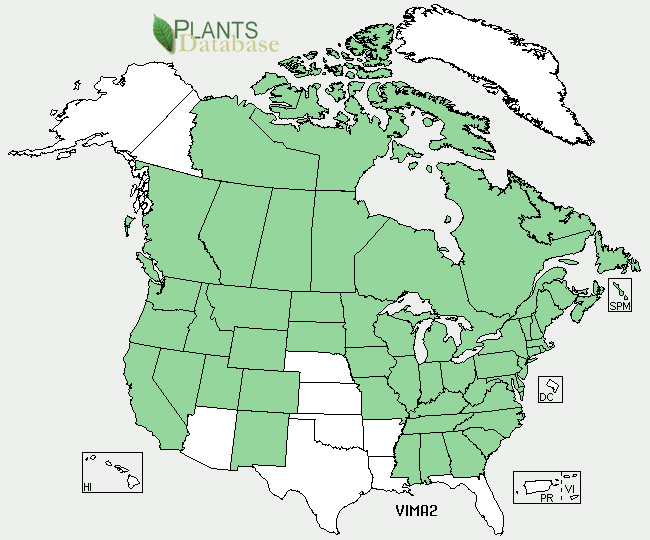
- Viola macloskeyi in US-Canada

= Viola macloskeyi =

Species of flowering plant

Viola macloskeyi (small white violet, northern white violet, smooth white violet, sweet white violet, western sweet violet, western sweet-white violet, wild white violet) is a flowering perennial plant in the violet family (Violaceae).

It is native to Canada, the northeastern, north-central, northwestern, southeastern, and southwestern United States and California, and the French islands of Saint Pierre and Miquelon.
