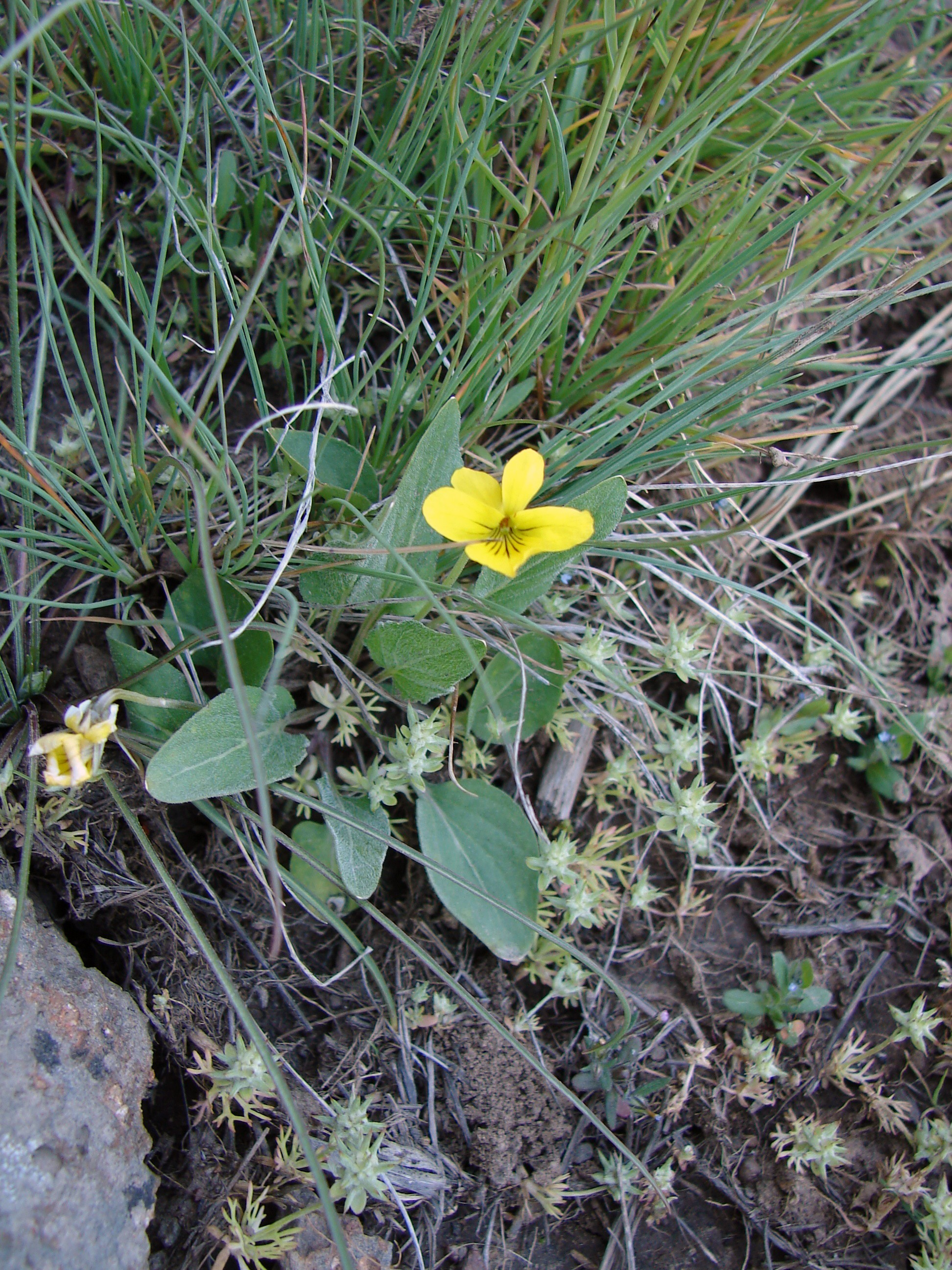

Scientific classification
- Kingdom: Plantae
- Clade: Tracheophytes
- Clade: Angiosperms
- Clade: Eudicots
- Clade: Rosids
- Order: Malpighiales
- Family: Violaceae
- Genus: Viola
- Species: V. nuttallii

Binomial name
- Viola nuttallii Pursh

= Viola nuttallii =

Species of flowering plant

Viola nuttallii (Nuttall's violet or yellow prairie violet) is a perennial herbaceous plant in the violet family (Violaceae), and is one of the few violet species with lanceolate leaves. It is native to the western Canada and the north-central and western United States, appearing in upper steppe lands, forests, and alpine ridges.

The genus name Viola means violet in Latin. For Nuttall's violet the only purple coloring is the nectar guides in the throat of the flower. The species name is given in honor of noted botanist Thomas Nuttall.

The plant is highly variable, usually with bright yellow petals. The veined, elliptical leaves are 2.5–10 centimeters (1–4 in) long.

The species serves as a larval host for the Coronis fritillary butterfly.

The leaves and flowers of the plant are edible as well as high in vitamins A and C. However, the rhizomes, fruits, and seeds are high in saponins and should not be eaten.
