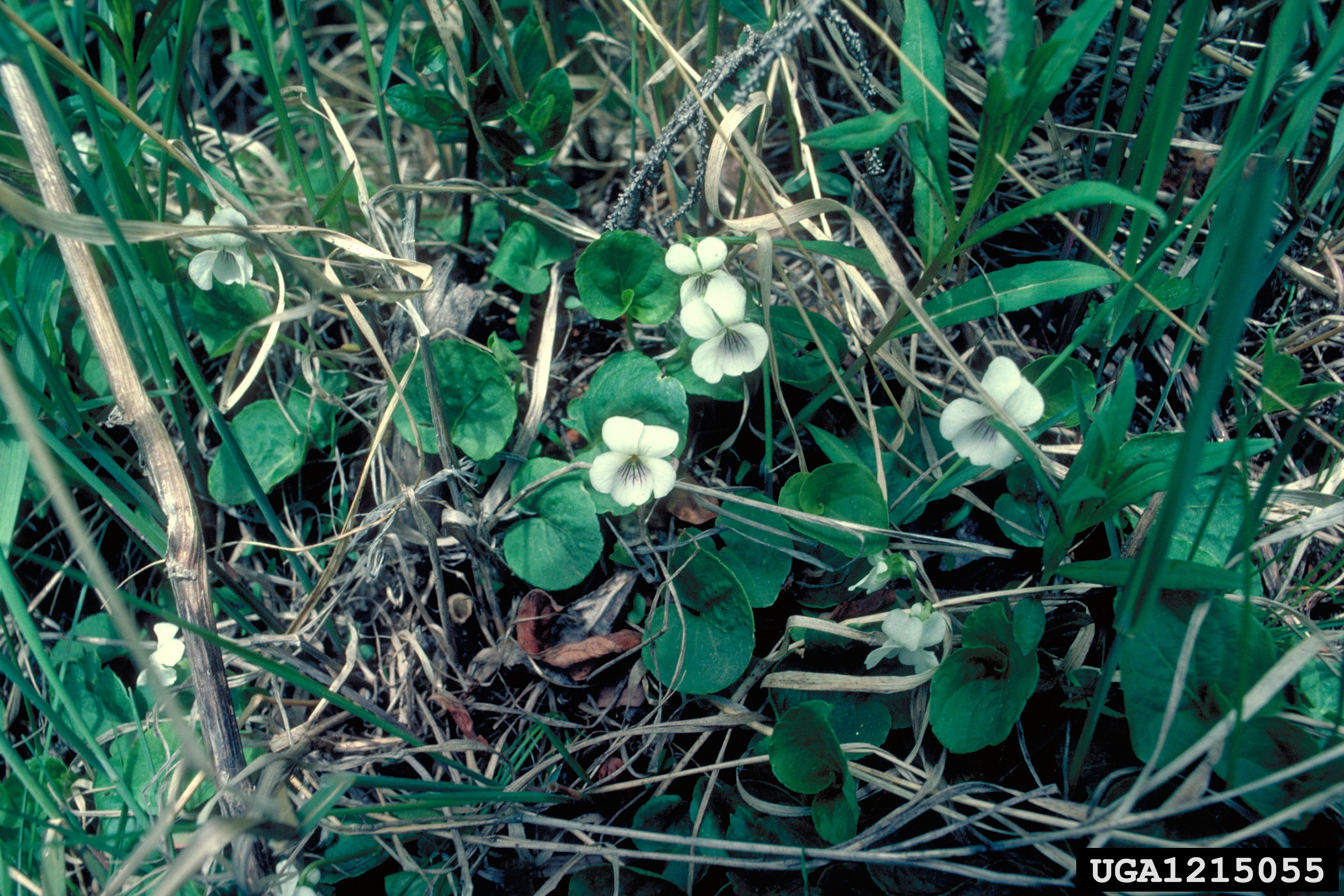

Conservation status
- Secure (NatureServe)

Scientific classification
- Kingdom: Plantae
- Clade: Tracheophytes
- Clade: Angiosperms
- Clade: Eudicots
- Clade: Rosids
- Order: Malpighiales
- Family: Violaceae
- Genus: Viola
- Species: V. renifolia

Binomial name
- Viola renifolia A.Gray

= Viola renifolia =

Species of flowering plant

Viola renifolia is a species of violet known by the common names white violet and kidneyleaf violet. It is native to northern North America, where it has a widespread distribution across Canada and the northern United States as far south as Washington, Colorado, and New York.

Kidneyleaf violet is a perennial herb growing up to 10 centimeters tall. It does not have stems, rhizomes, or stolons. The kidney-shaped leaf blades are 3 to 6 centimeters long and are borne on petioles up to 15 centimeters long. The flower is 1 to 1.5 centimeters long and white in color with purple lines on the lower three petals. The fruit is a purplish capsule.

This violet grows in white spruce and black spruce forests, and temperate coniferous forests. Near the Great Lakes it grows in swamps and wooded areas.

== Conservation status in the United States ==
It is listed as endangered in Connecticut, as threatened in Iowa, as extirpated in Pennsylvania, and as sensitive in Washington.
