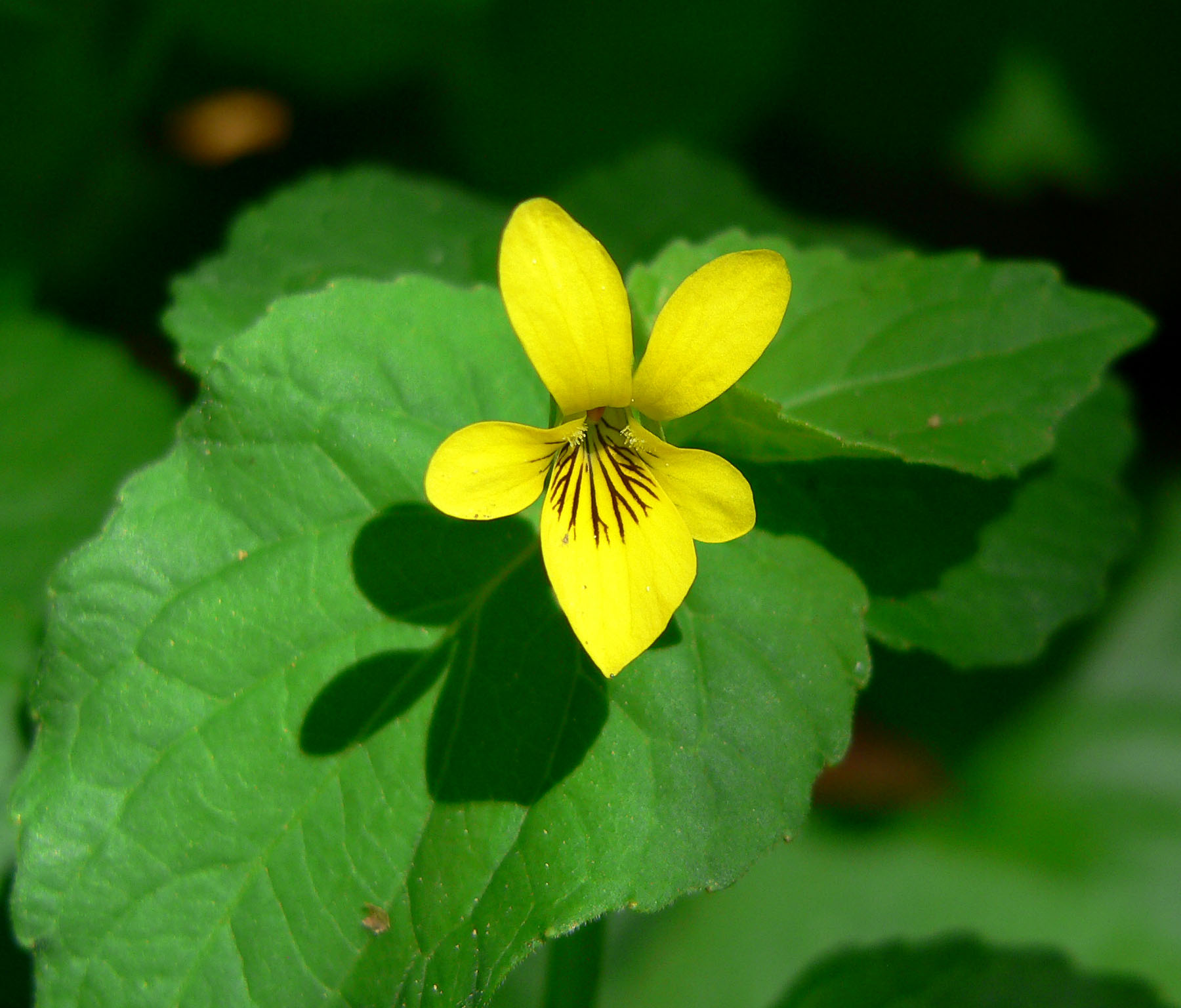

Scientific classification
- Kingdom: Plantae
- Clade: Embryophytes
- Clade: Tracheophytes
- Clade: Spermatophytes
- Clade: Angiosperms
- Clade: Eudicots
- Clade: Rosids
- Order: Malpighiales
- Family: Violaceae
- Genus: Viola
- Species: V. glabella

Binomial name
- Viola glabella Nutt.

= Viola glabella =

Species of flowering plant

Viola glabella, the stream violet or pioneer violet, is usually found along streams or in moist woods in northeastern Asia and northwestern North America.

Its petals are yellow on both sides, with the exception of dark purple nectar guides on the front of the lower three petals. The flowers arise from the same stems as the leaves. Viola glabella is a perennial herb, growing to 0.1 m (0 ft 4in) by 0.2 m (0 ft 8in) and blooming from April to July. The plant is deciduous and dies back completely to its roots during Autumn.

Viola glabella prefers moist, well-drained soil and can grow in part shade. Acidic and neutral soils are suitable for Viola glabella, which prefers a pH between 6 and 6.5, and becomes chlorotic if the pH is too high.

Young leaves and flower buds are edible, raw or cooked, but the yellow flowers can cause diarrhoea.
