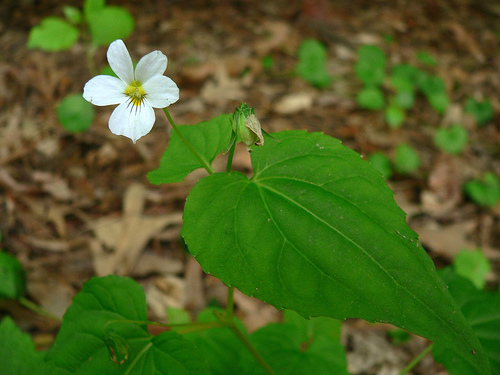

Scientific classification
- Kingdom: Plantae
- Clade: Tracheophytes
- Clade: Angiosperms
- Clade: Eudicots
- Clade: Rosids
- Order: Malpighiales
- Family: Violaceae
- Genus: Viola
- Species: V. canadensis

Binomial name
- Viola canadensis L.

Synonyms
- Lophion canadense (L.) Spach; Lophion rydbergii (Greene) Nieuwl. & Lunell; Viola geminiflora Greene; Viola muriculata Greene; Viola neomexicana Greene; Viola neo-mexicana Greene; Viola rydbergii Greene; Lophion rugulosum (Greene) Lunell, syn of var. rugulosa; Viola scopulorum (A.Gray) Greene, syn of var. scopulorum

= Viola canadensis =

Species of flowering plant

Viola canadensis is a flowering plant in the Violaceae family. It is commonly known as Canadian white violet, Canada violet, tall white violet, or white violet. It is widespread across much of Canada and the United States, from Alaska to Newfoundland, south as far as Georgia and Arizona. It is a perennial herb and the Latin-specific epithet canadensis means of Canada.

Viola canadensis bears white blooms with yellow bases and sometimes streaks of purple. The petals are purple-tinged on the backside. The leaves are heart-shaped, with coarse, rounded teeth.

Subspecies and varieties

- Viola canadensis var. canadensis
- Viola canadensis subsp. canadensis
- Viola canadensis var. rugulosa (Greene) C.L. Hitchc.
- Viola canadensis subsp. scopulorum (A. Gray) House

== Conservation status in the United States ==
It is listed as endangered in Illinois, Maine, and New Jersey, as threatened in Connecticut, and having a historical range in Rhode Island.

== Uses ==
The leaves and blossoms are edible. The latter can be used to make jelly.

The South Ojibwa use a decoction of the root for pains near the bladder.
