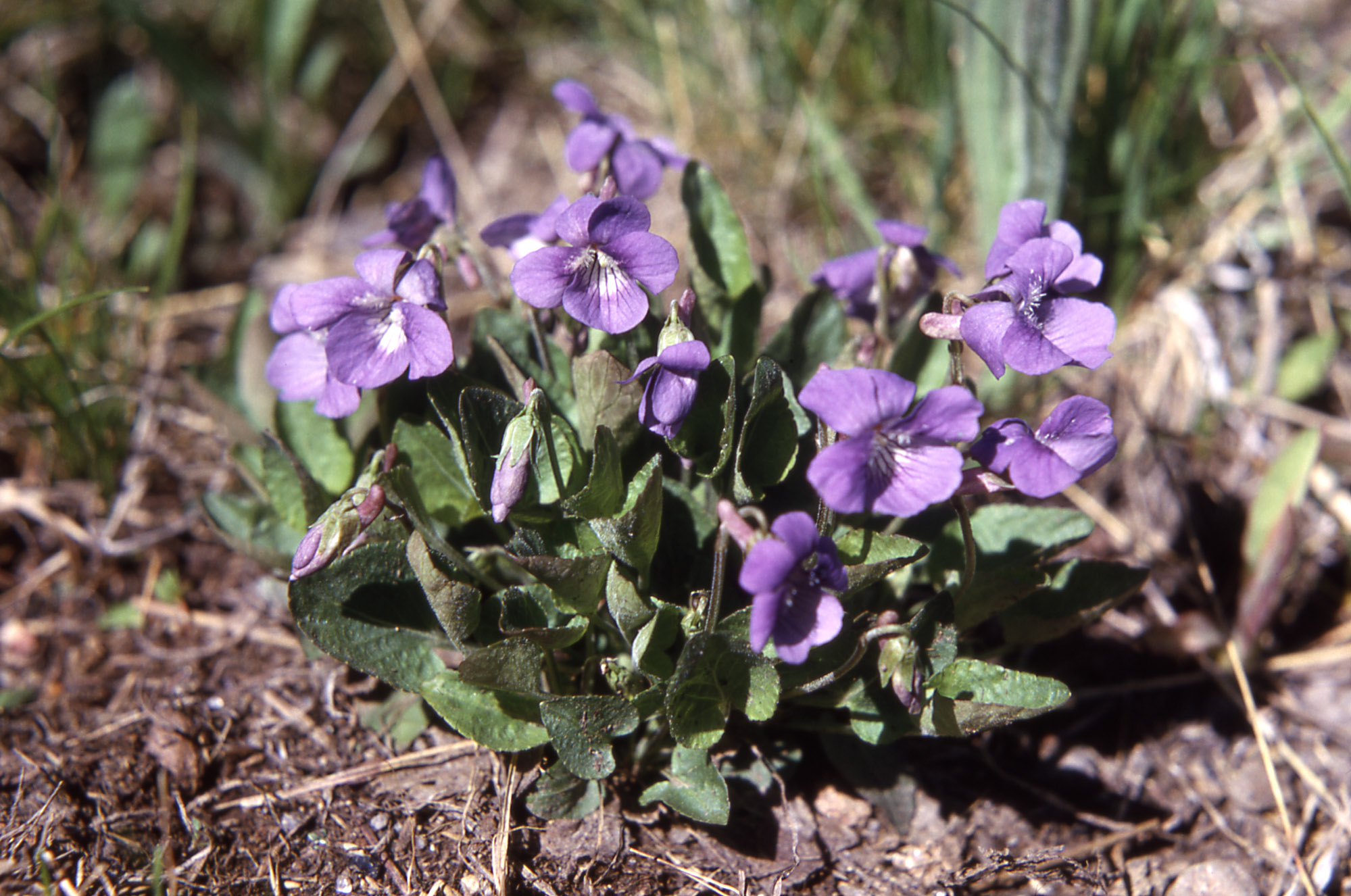

Scientific classification
- Kingdom: Plantae
- Clade: Tracheophytes
- Clade: Angiosperms
- Clade: Eudicots
- Clade: Rosids
- Order: Malpighiales
- Family: Violaceae
- Genus: Viola
- Species: V. nephrophylla

Binomial name
- Viola nephrophylla Greene
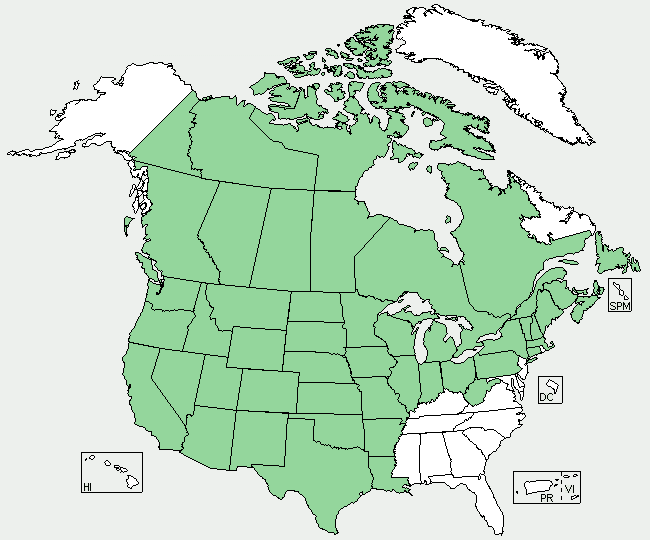
- Distribution of Viola nephrophylla

Synonyms
- Viola maccabeana M.S. Baker; Viola pratincola Greene; Viola retusa Greene

= Viola nephrophylla =

Species of flowering plant

Viola nephrophylla (northern bog violet, Leconte violet, or kidney leaved violet) syn. Viola nephrophylla Greene f. albinea (Farw.), Viola pratincola Greene, Viola retusa Greene, is an annual or perennial forb in the Violet family (Violaceae) native to North America.

Viola nephrophylla was named by Edward Lee Greene in 1896 from specimens he collected near Montrose, Colorado. The species name, nephrophylla, is from the Greek for "kidney shaped leaves".

Its habitats include moist meadows and open woods.

== Conservation status within the United States ==
It is listed endangered in Massachusetts, New York, and Ohio, as threatened in New Hampshire, and as a special concern in Connecticut.

== Native American ethnobotany ==
The Ramah Navajo use the plant as a ceremonial emetic.
