= Hartz Mountains National Park =

- IUCN category II (national park)
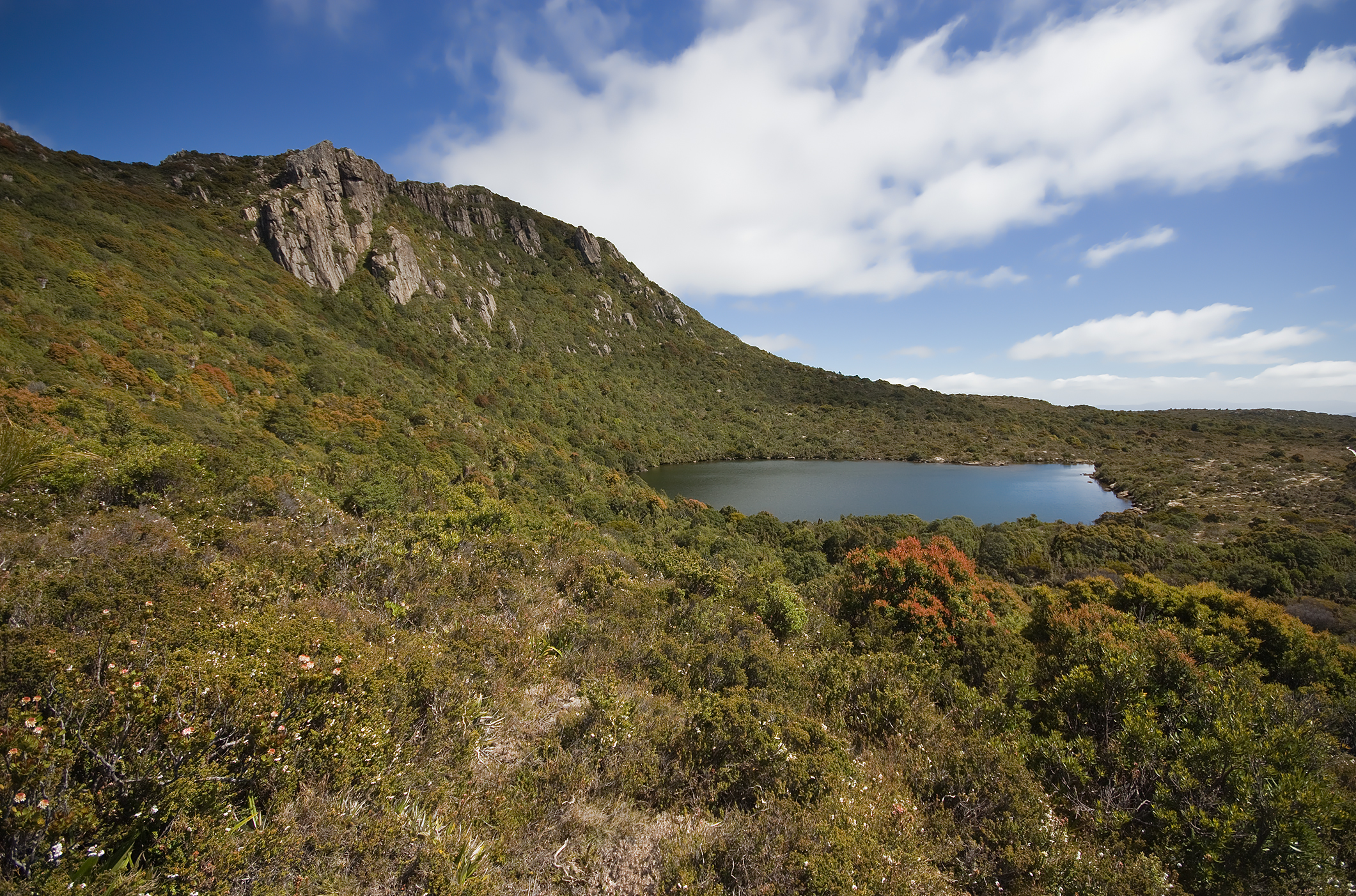
- Ladies Tarn, Hartz National Park

- Location within Tasmania
- Interactive map of Hartz Mountains National Park
- Location: Tasmania
- Nearest city: Huonville
- Coordinates: 43°13′47″S 146°45′22″E
- Area: 71.4 km^{2} (27.6 sq mi)
- Established: 1939
- Visitors: 11800 (in 2005)
- Governing body: Tasmania Parks and Wildlife Service
- Website: Official website

UNESCO World Heritage Site
- Criteria: Cultural: iii, iv, vi, vii; natural: viii, ix, x
- Reference: 181
- Inscription: 1982 (6th Session)

Hartz Mountains National Park is located in the south of Tasmania, Australia. It is one of 19 Tasmanian National Parks, and in 1989 it was included in the Tasmanian Wilderness World Heritage Area, in recognition of its natural and cultural values. The Hartz Mountains were named after the Harz mountain range in Germany.

== Geography and geology ==
Most of the park is over 600 metres above sea level, with altitudes ranging from 160 m at the Picton River to 1,255 m at Hartz Peak. The backbone of rock in the park is dolerite, while the southern areas at lower altitudes are constituted from sedimentary rocks formed from sediments deposited by marine, glacial and freshwater sources between 355 and 180 million years ago. The relief has been modified over time by several ice ages, forming cirques, horn peaks, aretes and glacial troughs.

== Flora and fauna ==
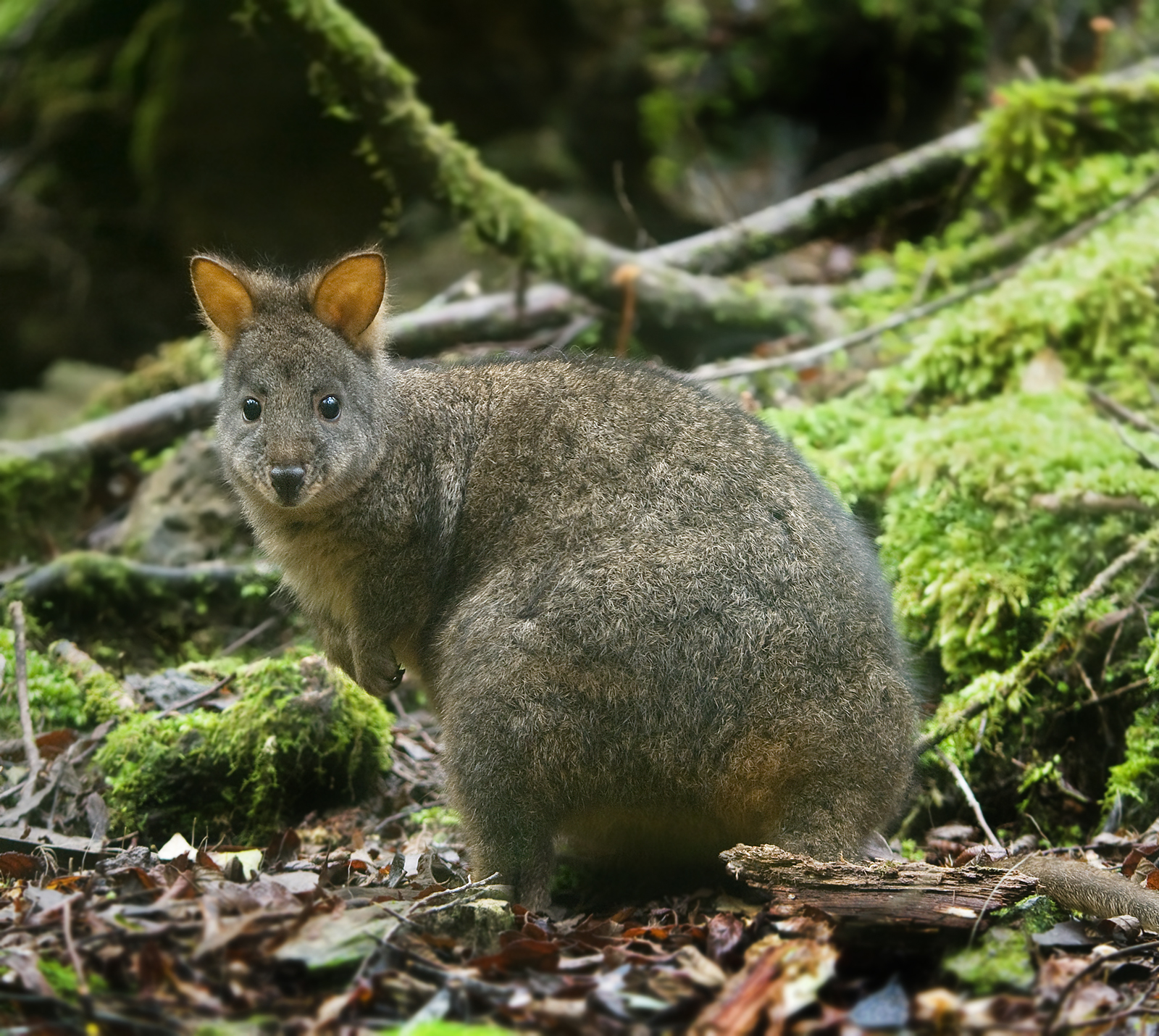
Tasmanian pademelons inhabit the park

The varied vegetation includes wet eucalypt forests, mixed forests dominated by stringybark, rainforests, sub-alpine and alpine forests. The rainforest communities are dominated by myrtle, sassafras, leatherwood and native laurel. The sub-alpine forests are dominated by three eucalypt types: snow gum, varnished gum, and yellow gum (Eucalyptus subcrenulata). Much of the understorey is made of heath plants, including the Tasmanian waratah.

Most mammals in the park are nocturnal, and include Bennett's wallabies, Tasmanian pademelons, brushtail possums, echidnas and platypus. Among amphibians outstanding is the moss froglet which was discovered at Hartz Mountains in 1992. Some of the common birds in the park include the eastern spinebill, green rosella, forest raven and several honeyeaters.

== Human history ==
The area of the park was once inhabited by the Mellukerdee aboriginal people. The first Europeans came to the area in the 19th century in search of Huon pine timber.

In the 1840s early settlers including the Geeves family founded the township of Geeveston, and laid the first track to the Hartz Mountains. As a result, the area became one of Tasmania's earliest popular bushwalking destinations. The increasing popularity of the area for recreation led to it being declared a scenic reserve in 1939. In 1951 it was proclaimed to a national park, and in 1989 it was included in the Tasmanian Wilderness World Heritage Area.

== Climate ==
The Hartz Mountains area experiences typical south-west weather conditions. In all seasons there can be snow, chilling rains, low temperatures, strong winds, upslope fog and sudden weather changes.

Climate data for the region are sourced from Keoghs Pimple, at an altitude of 831 metres (2,726 ft) and operating since 1996. It is an extremely rainy climate with 252 such days per annum, though which tends to fall as light showers or drizzle, with frequent snowfalls that can occur at any time of the year. The mean afternoon relative humidity, is likewise extraordinary.

Climate data for Hartz Mountain (Keoghs Pimple, 1996–2024); 831 m AMSL; 43.20° S, 146.77° E
Month	Jan	Feb	Mar	Apr	May	Jun	Jul	Aug	Sep	Oct	Nov	Dec	Year
Record high °C (°F)	35.2 (95.4)	32.6 (90.7)	34.0 (93.2)	24.3 (75.7)	18.8 (65.8)	14.8 (58.6)	15.4 (59.7)	16.6 (61.9)	24.8 (76.6)	26.5 (79.7)	30.0 (86.0)	34.0 (93.2)	35.2 (95.4)
Mean daily maximum °C (°F)	17.9 (64.2)	17.2 (63.0)	14.5 (58.1)	11.0 (51.8)	8.5 (47.3)	6.9 (44.4)	6.0 (42.8)	6.6 (43.9)	8.6 (47.5)	11.0 (51.8)	13.8 (56.8)	15.1 (59.2)	11.4 (52.6)
Mean daily minimum °C (°F)	7.2 (45.0)	7.2 (45.0)	6.3 (43.3)	4.6 (40.3)	3.4 (38.1)	2.2 (36.0)	1.4 (34.5)	1.4 (34.5)	1.9 (35.4)	2.7 (36.9)	4.4 (39.9)	5.3 (41.5)	4.0 (39.2)
Record low °C (°F)	−0.1 (31.8)	−0.2 (31.6)	−0.8 (30.6)	−1.8 (28.8)	−2.5 (27.5)	−3.0 (26.6)	−3.7 (25.3)	−4.4 (24.1)	−3.4 (25.9)	−3.4 (25.9)	−2.8 (27.0)	−1.2 (29.8)	−4.4 (24.1)
Average precipitation mm (inches)	61.4 (2.42)	62.0 (2.44)	74.2 (2.92)	73.0 (2.87)	90.9 (3.58)	101.1 (3.98)	105.7 (4.16)	129.1 (5.08)	101.5 (4.00)	98.9 (3.89)	76.4 (3.01)	83.0 (3.27)	1,038.7 (40.89)
Average precipitation days (≥ 0.2 mm)	16.2	16.3	19.4	20.1	23.5	22.0	25.3	25.3	23.3	22.7	19.4	19.7	253.2
Average afternoon relative humidity (%)	67	69	77	84	90	91	92	86	84	79	73	73	80
Source: Australian Bureau of Meteorology

== See also ==
- List of national parks of Tasmania
