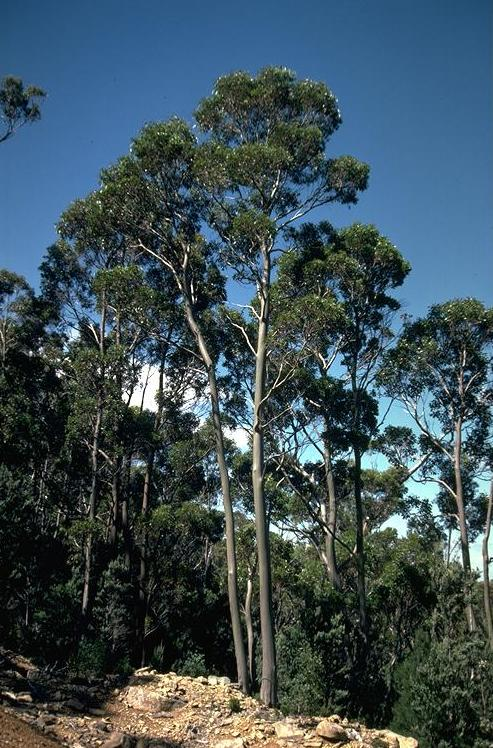
- Eucalyptus subcrenulata in Mount Field National Park

Scientific classification
- Kingdom: Plantae
- Clade: Embryophytes
- Clade: Tracheophytes
- Clade: Spermatophytes
- Clade: Angiosperms
- Clade: Eudicots
- Clade: Rosids
- Order: Myrtales
- Family: Myrtaceae
- Genus: Eucalyptus
- Subgenus: Eucalyptus subg. Symphyomyrtus
- Species: E. subcrenulata

Binomial name
- Eucalyptus subcrenulata Maiden & Blakely

= Eucalyptus subcrenulata =

Tasmanian alpine yellow gum

Species of eucalyptus

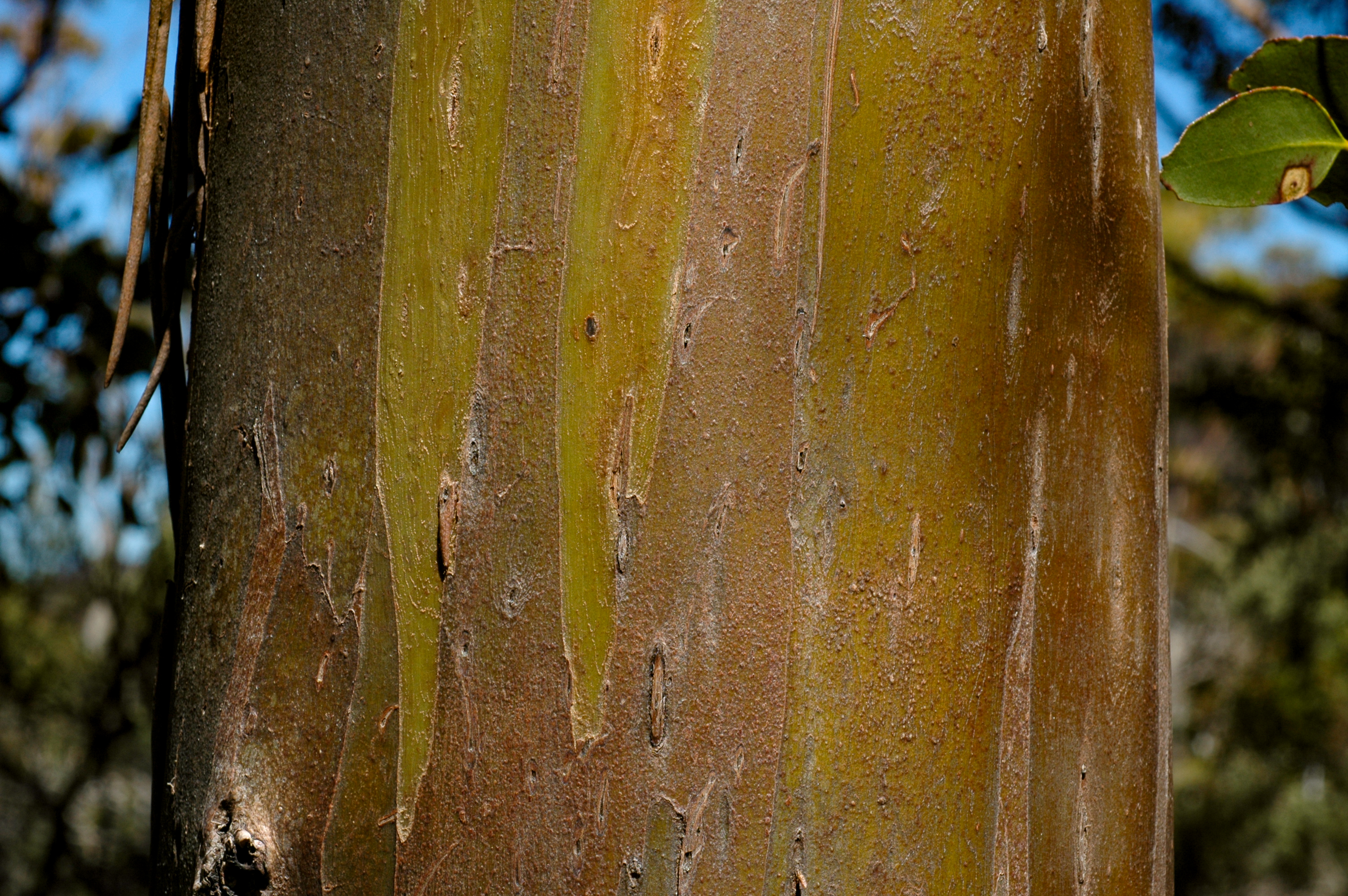
E. subcrenulata distinctive younger bark colouration.

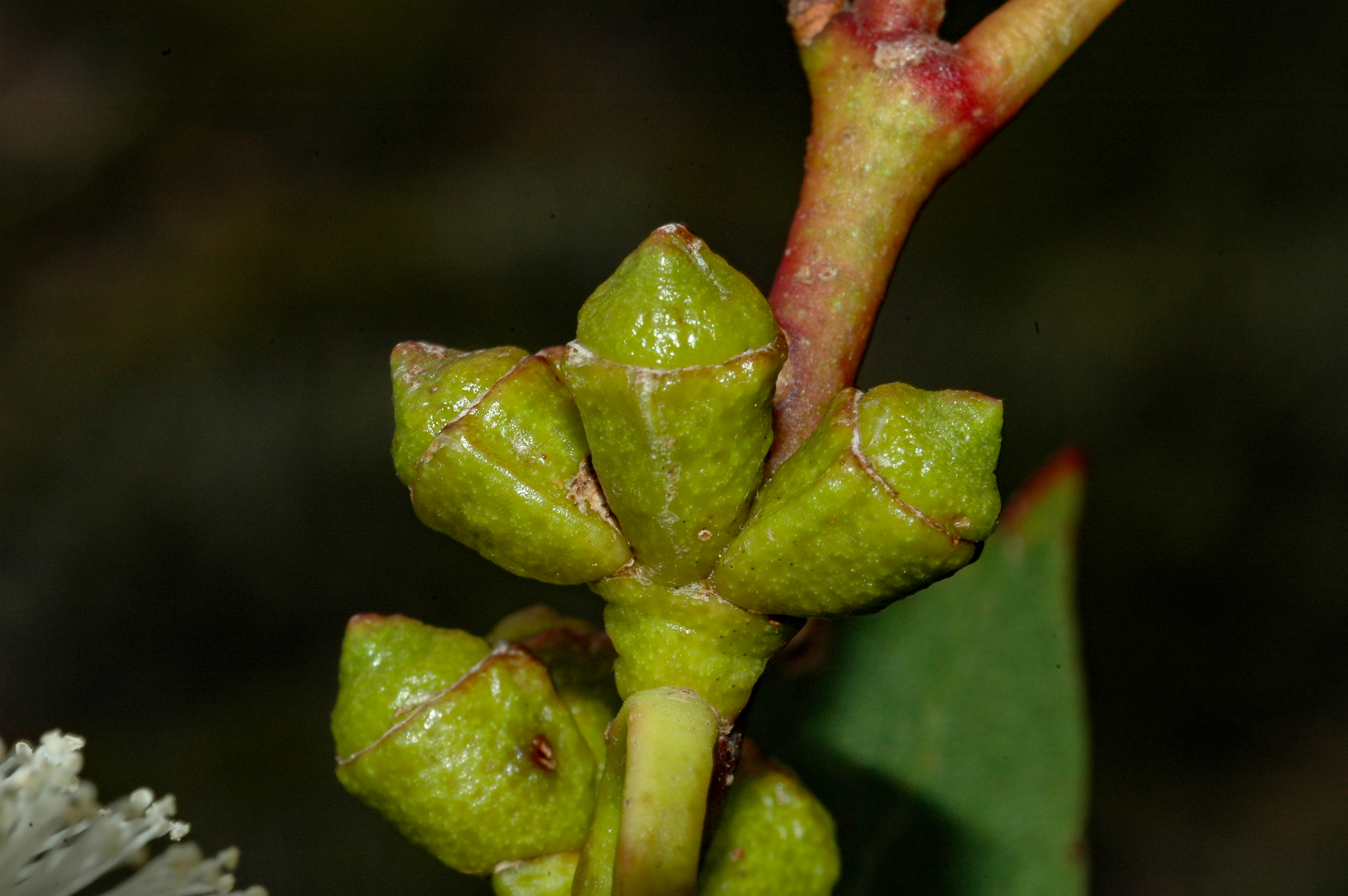
Flower buds

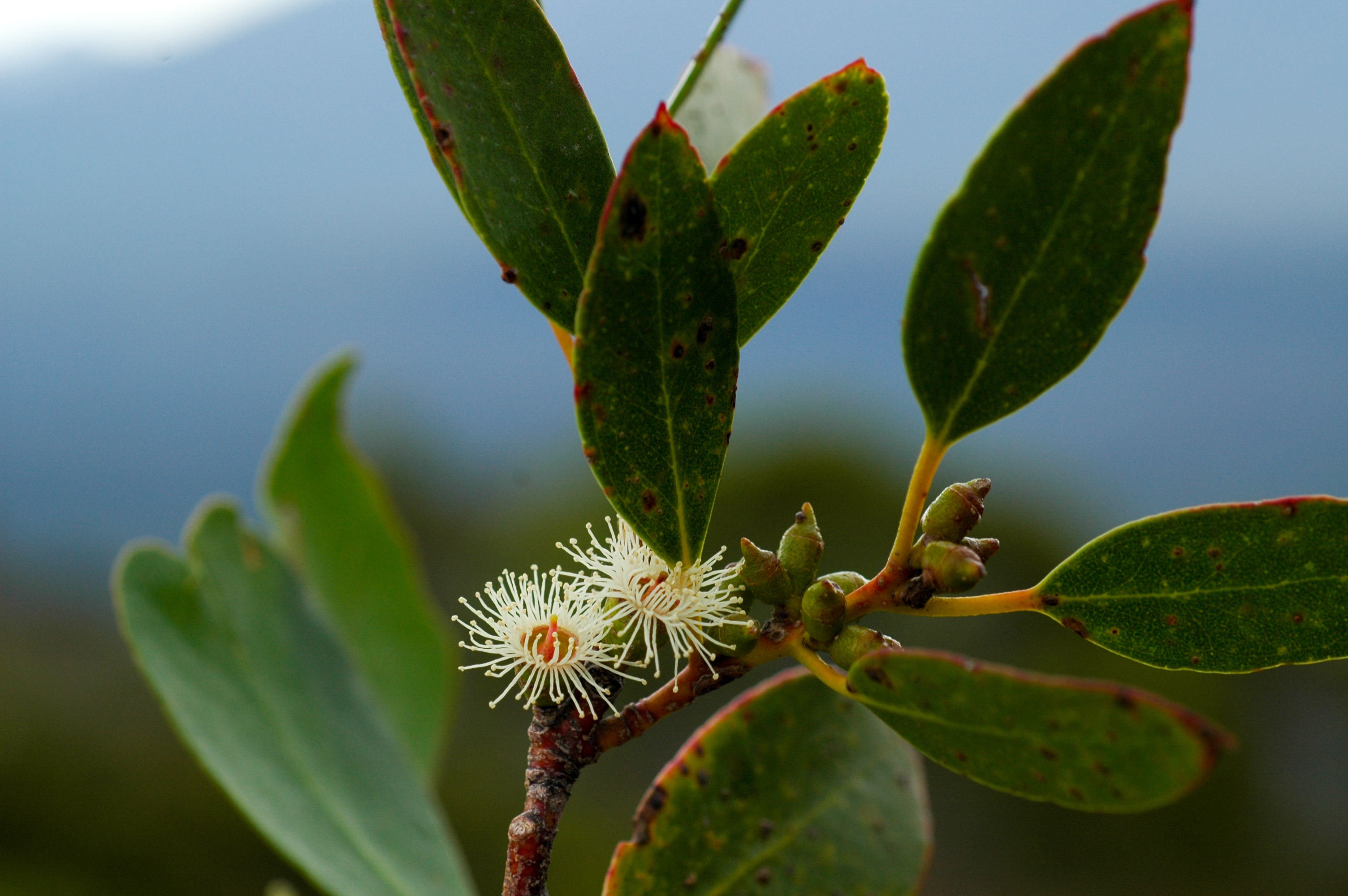
Distinctive white flower clusters

Eucalyptus subcrenulata, commonly known as Tasmanian alpine yellow gum, is a species of small to medium-sized tree that is endemic to the highlands of Tasmania. It has smooth bark, glossy green, lance-shaped to egg-shaped adult leaves, flower buds in groups of three, white flowers and hemispherical to bell-shaped fruit. It is similar to E. johnstonii, E. vernicosa and E. urnigera.

== Description ==
Eucalyptus subcrenulata is a tree that typically grows to a height of 18–20 m (59–66 ft), sometimes a tall, straight tree to 60 m (200 ft), and forms a lignotuber. It has smooth, pale grey to brown or yellowish bark, often with horizontal black scars. Young plants and coppice regrowth have stems that are square in cross-section, sometimes with a wing on each corner and sessile leaves, arranged in opposite pairs. These leaves are egg-shaped to round, glossy green, 30–85 mm (1.2–3.3 in) long and 30–50 mm (1.2–2.0 in) wide with small teeth on the edge. Adult leaves are arranged alternately, lance-shaped to egg-shaped, the same shade of glossy green on both sides, 52–135 mm (2.0–5.3 in) long and 20–45 mm (0.79–1.77 in) wide, tapering at the base to a petiole 15–37 mm (0.59–1.46 in) long. The edge of the leaves sometimes have small teeth, the veins are at an angle greater than 45° to midrib and the leaves have a strong spicy aroma when crushed.

The flower buds are arranged in leaf axils in groups of three on an unbranched peduncle 2–6 mm (0.079–0.236 in) long, the individual buds sessile. Mature buds are oval, 6–8 mm (0.24–0.31 in) long and 4–6 mm (0.16–0.24 in) wide with a rounded to beaked operculum. Flowering occurs from November to May, peaking between January and March, and the flowers are white. The fruit is a sessile, woody, hemispherical to bell-shaped capsule 5–7 mm (0.20–0.28 in) long and 5–9 mm (0.20–0.35 in) wide with the valves at rim level or slightly above.

== Taxonomy and naming ==
Eucalyptus subcrenulata was first formally described in 1929 by Joseph Maiden and William Blakely in Maiden's book A Critical Revision of the Genus Eucalyptus, from specimens he collected near Mount Field East in 1906. The specific epithet (subcrenulata) is derived from the Latin sub- meaning "somewhat" or "not completely" and crenulatus meaning "having small, rounded teeth", referring to the leaf edges.

This eucalypt is in the subgenus Symphyomyrtus, section Maidenaria, series Semiunicolores along with two other Tasmanian species, Tasmanian yellow gum (E. johnstonii), varnished gum (E. vernicosa) and two mainland species, Mt Imlay mallee (E. imlayensis) and Nunniong gum (E. elaeophloia. Eucalypts in section Maidenaria have cotyledons with two lobes, flower buds in leaf axils and with two opercula, stamens with versatile anthers and flattened seeds with a ventral hilum. The species in the series Semiunicoloreshave smooth bark, juvenile leaves mostly arranged in opposite pairs and with toothed margins, glossy green crown leaves, flower buds in threes and sessile fruit.

Eucalyptus johnstonii tends to occur at lower altitudes than E. subcrenulata and E. vernicosa, usually a small-leaved shrub, at the highest. It is also similar to urn gum (E. urnigera) in series Orbiculares but that species is distinguished by its urn-shaped fruit. The mainland species have more greyish leaves.

== Distribution and habitat ==
Eucalyptus subcrenulata grows on exposed ridges, plateaus and slopes in subalpine woodland on the central and western highlands of Tasmania, including in the Mount Field National Park and Great Western Tiers. It also occurs with E. coccifera in the more exposed subalpine woodlands.

== Use in horticulture ==
Tasmanian alpine yellow gum grows best in well-drained soil in a sunny location. It is frost resistant but must be kept watered. It is recognised as being very cold-tolerant in both New Zealand and Britain. Evans (1986) even identified E. subcrenulata as being a promising species for planting in milder areas of the United Kingdom.
