= Eucalyptus elaeophloia =

Nunniong gum

Conservation status
- Endangered (IUCN 3.1)

Scientific classification
- Kingdom: Plantae
- Clade: Tracheophytes
- Clade: Angiosperms
- Clade: Eudicots
- Clade: Rosids
- Order: Myrtales
- Family: Myrtaceae
- Genus: Eucalyptus
- Species: E. elaeophloia

Binomial name
- Eucalyptus elaeophloia Chappill, Crisp & Prober

Synonyms
- Eucalyptus sp. (Brumby Point)

Species of eucalyptus

Eucalyptus elaeophloia, commonly known as Nunniong gum or olive mallee, is a species of tree or mallee that is endemic to a restricted area in Victoria. It has mostly smooth greenish to greyish bark, glossy green, lance-shaped adult leaves, flower buds in groups of three, white flowers and conical or hemispherical fruit.

== Description ==
Eucalyptus elaeophloia is a tree or mallee that typically grows to a height of 4–12 m (13–39 ft) and forms a lignotuber. It has smooth greenish to greyish bark, sometimes with rough bark at the base. Young plants and coppice regrowth have most leaves arranged in opposite pairs, elliptical to egg-shaped or almost round, 30–40 mm (1.2–1.6 in) long and 20–40 mm (0.79–1.57 in) wide. Adult leaves are arranged alternately, glossy green, lance-shaped to egg-shaped or curved, 30–40 mm (1.2–1.6 in) long and 20–40 mm (0.79–1.57 in) wide on a flattened petiole 8–20 mm (0.31–0.79 in) long. The flower buds are arranged in leaf axils in groups of three on an unbranched peduncle 2–4 mm (0.079–0.157 in) long, the individual buds sessile. Mature buds are oval, 5–7 mm (0.20–0.28 in) long and 3–5 mm (0.12–0.20 in) wide with a conical operculum. Flowering occurs in March and the flowers are white. The fruit is a sessile, woody, conical or hemispherical capsule 4–5 mm (0.16–0.20 in) long and 6–8 mm (0.24–0.31 in) wide with the valves extended well beyond the rim of the fruit.

== Taxonomy and naming ==
Eucalyptus elaeophloia was first formally described in 1990 by Jennifer Chappill, Michael Crisp and Suzanne Prober in the journal Australian Systematic Botany. The type material was collected in 1987 from Brumby Point in the Alpine National Park. The specific epithet (elaeophloia) is derived from the ancient Greek word elaia meaning "olive", referring to the greenish colour of the bark.

This species is closely related to Eucalyptus imlayensis which occurs in New South Wales.

== Distribution ==
Nunniong gum is only known from the Nunniong Plateau.

Due to widespread bushfires in 2003, the known habitat of the species was completely burnt, however most individuals have since resprouted from trunks and lignotubers.

== Conservation status ==
This species is listed as "vulnerable" on the Department of Sustainability and Environment's Advisory List of Rare Or Threatened Plants In Victoria. The IUCN Red List assesses the species as endangered.

== See also ==
- List of Eucalyptus species
