= Brumby Point =

Mountain in Victoria, Australia

Coordinates: 37°03′11″S 148°04′44″E

Brumby Point is a peak on the remote Nunniong Plateau in the Alpine National Park in Victoria, Australia. Distinct from the similarly named Brumby Hill to the north-west, it is bounded by Reedy Creek Chasm to the north and Little Reedy Creek to the south. The locality has been noted for visible folds in the Ordovician rock. A number of rare plant species occur in the area including Eucalyptus elaeophloia and Leptospermum jingera. The "brumby mallee-gum", recently discovered in this location, was formally described in 2013 and assigned the name Eucalyptus phoenix. The seven kilometre long Brumby Point four wheel drive track which traversed the ridge leading up to the point was earmarked for permanent closure in 1992.

== See also ==
- Alpine National Park
- List of mountains in Australia § Victoria
