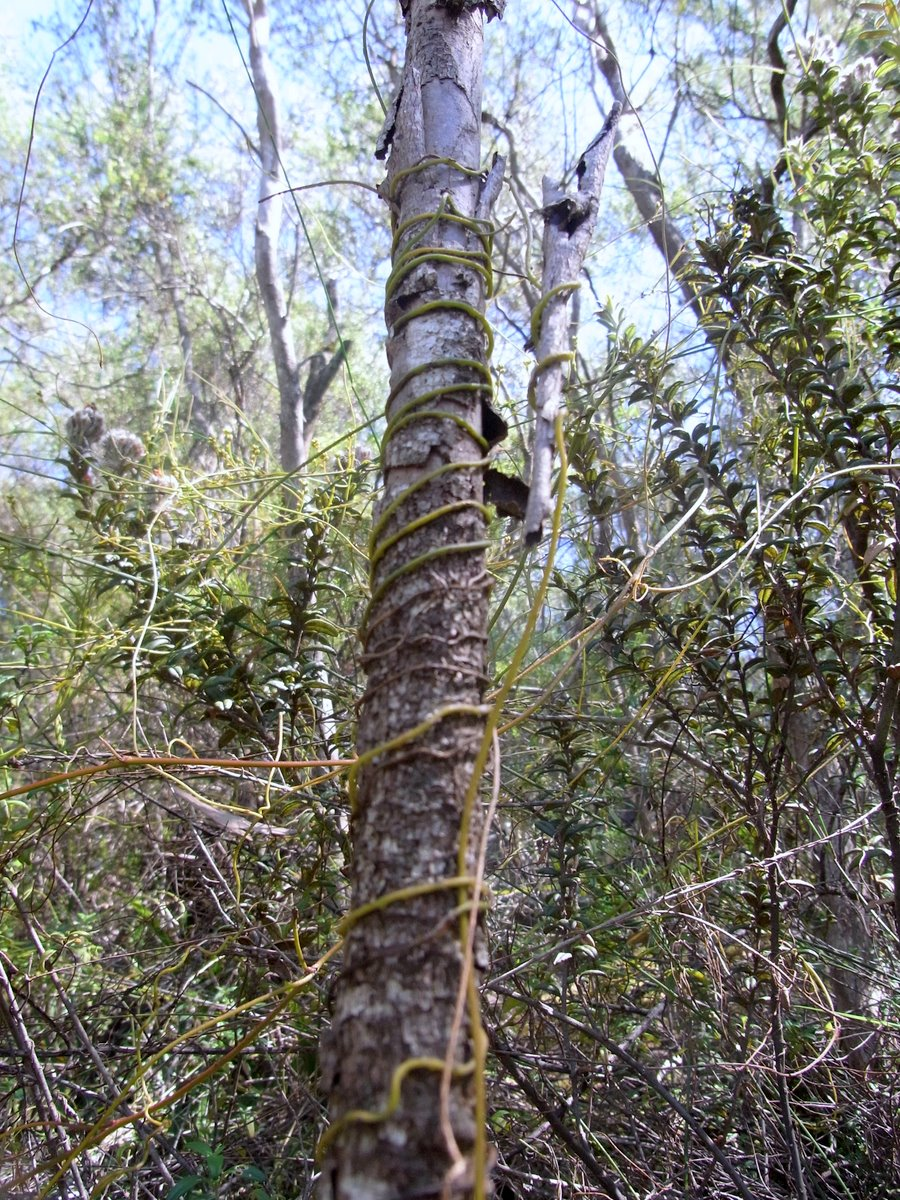
- Cassytha pubescens on a mallee, Mount Imlay National Park, Australia

Scientific classification
- Kingdom: Plantae
- Clade: Tracheophytes
- Clade: Angiosperms
- Clade: Magnoliids
- Order: Laurales
- Family: Lauraceae
- Genus: Cassytha
- Species: C. pubescens

Binomial name
- Cassytha pubescens R.Br.

Synonyms
- Cassytha phaeolasia F.Muell.; Cassytha paniculata R.Br.

= Cassytha pubescens =

Species of plant

Cassytha pubescens is a native Australian hemiparasitic vine species, in the Laurel family. Common names for the species include devils twine, dodder-laurel, spilled devil's twine, snotty gobble or downy dodder-laurel. It is a widespread and common species in south eastern Australia. The species was first formally described in 1810 by the Scottish botanist Robert Brown in Prodromus Flora Novae Hollandiae et Insulae Van Diemen (Prodromus of the Flora of New Holland and Van Diemen's Land). Leaves are reduced to scales and photosynthesis is achieved through chlorophyll contained in the plants stems. Stems are between 0.5mm and 1.5mm in diameter and the haustoria are between 2 and 3 mm long.

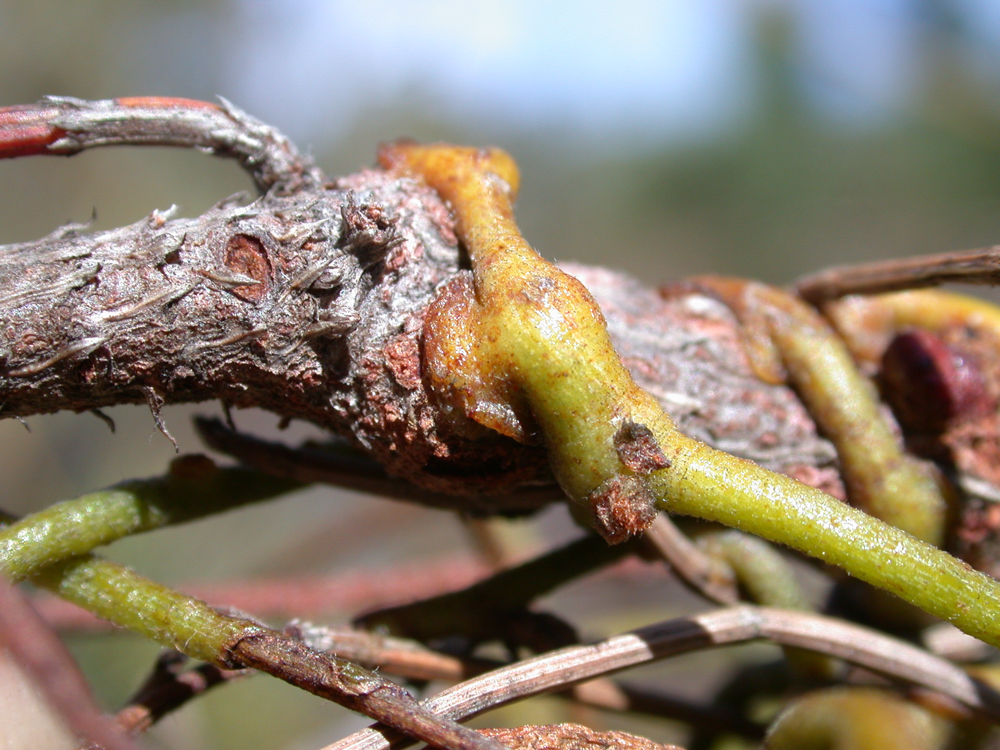
Cassytha pubescense haustoria on a host, Mt Field National Park, Tasmania

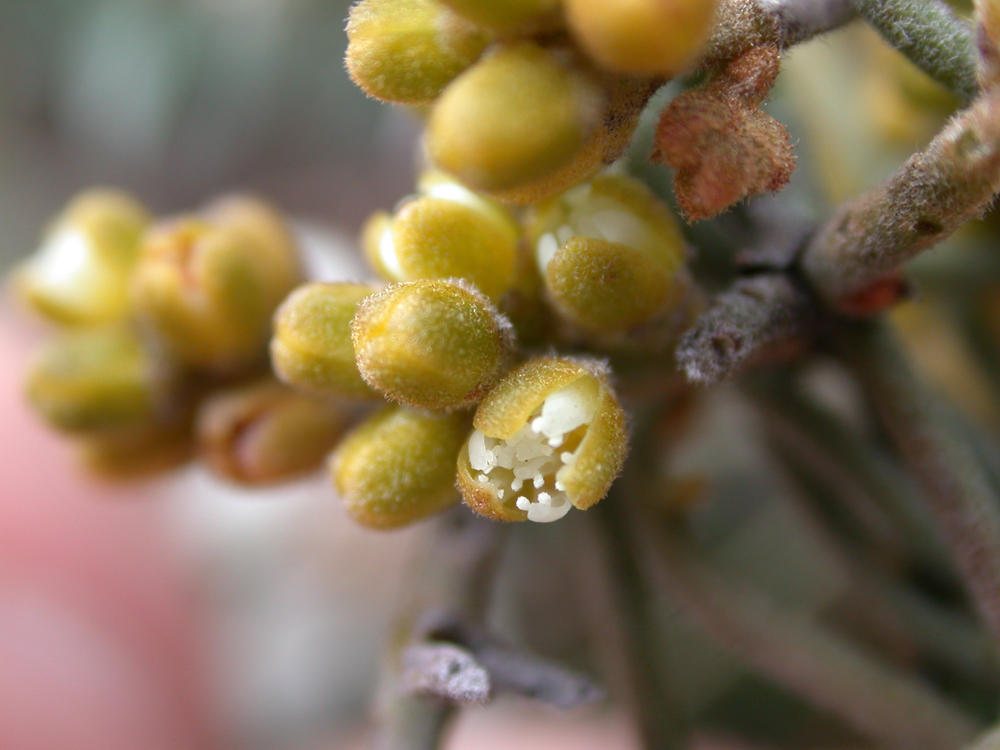
Cassytha pubescense flowering, Mt Field National Park, Tasmania

Cassytha pubescens is often compared with the genus Cuscuta (Convolvulaceae) due to similarities in their morphology and herbaceous parasitic habit.

== Description ==
Cassytha pubescens grows as a photosynthetic stem that twines around itself and around the branches of its host. Stems are between 0.5 and 1.5 mm thick and can be highly variable in appearance. In darker more humid conditions the stems have been noted to be dark green in colour, glabrescent and with very few pale grey hairs however stems can be glabrescent to pubescent, smooth to wrinkly and can vary in colour on a single plant.

High variation exists in flowers, fruits, stems and trichomes within individuals, across individuals in a population and across populations of Cassytha pubescens. It has been speculated that the variation is likely a result of a combination of reproductive isolation across populations and in some cases phenotypic modification to different environments. Flowers may occur on spikes, racemes or panicles and are either sessile or almost sessile. Peduncles can be 3-20mm long with or without hairs. Peduncles up to 10 cm have been noted in specimens from NE NSW and QLD. Flowers have pubescent petals and 9 stamens, with the outer stamens dorsiventrally flattened. When fleshy, fruit can be green, greeny-red, grey to greeny-red in colour and may be anywhere between smooth to pubescent. Fruit is globose to obovoid in shape and ranges in size from 6-10mm × 5.5-9mm. Fruit may be covered in dull green to dull-reddy brown bands. Fruit is grey to black when dry/ drying.

Flowering occurs in summer through the months of December to April with fruit developing from March to April.

== Distribution and habitat ==
Cassytha pubescence is widespread along the east coast of Australia not extending into arid regions. The species extends from the south-east of Queensland into the eastern half of NSW and into south-eastern South Australia. The species is also found across eastern and western regions of Victoria and Tasmania. Cassytha pubescence is most commonly found in dry forests in woodlands.

== Ecology ==
Cassytha pubescens has a very wide host range but is mostly confined to both native and invasive woody perennial shrubs. Cassytha pubescens spreads mostly through vegetative growth, using haustoria to fuse itself around the stems of its host. The haustoria in Cassytha pubescens are disk like organs that penetrate the xylem of their host in order to extract water and essential nutrients. Host attachment must occur within the first 6 weeks after germination for survival.

Suggestions have been made to use Cassytha pubescens as a biological control due to its possible adverse effect on invasive hosts compared with native hosts. A study comparing the effects of the hemiparasite on native Leptospermum myrsinoides and the invasive legume Cytisus scoparius, found that Cassytha had little to no effect on the Leptospermum and significantly decreased the biomass and physiological capabilities of the introduced legume.
