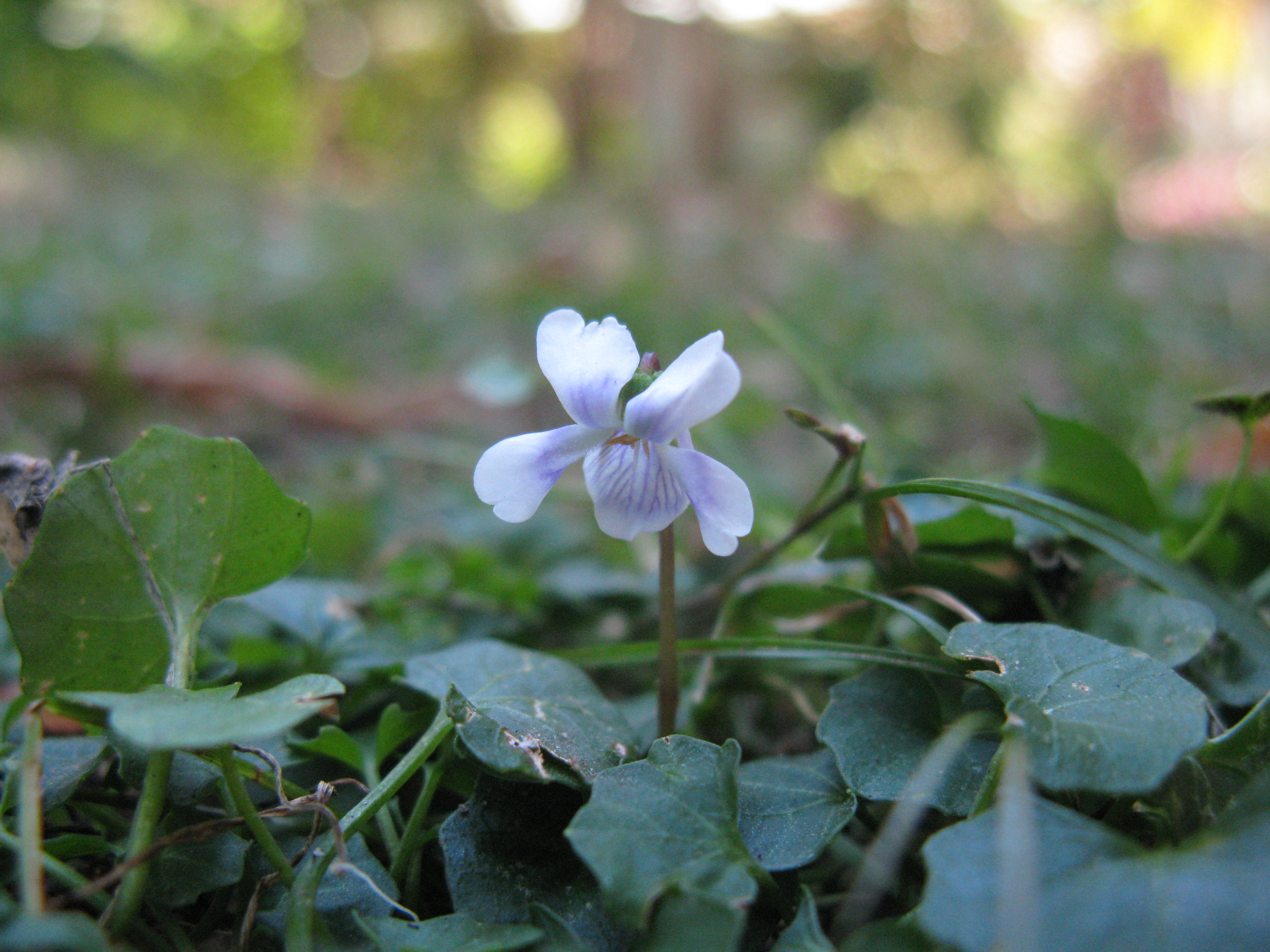

Scientific classification
- Kingdom: Plantae
- Clade: Tracheophytes
- Clade: Angiosperms
- Clade: Eudicots
- Clade: Rosids
- Order: Malpighiales
- Family: Violaceae
- Genus: Viola
- Species: V. hederacea

Binomial name
- Viola hederacea Labill.

= Viola hederacea =

Australian violet

Species of flowering plant

Viola hederacea, the Australian violet, is a species of flowering plant in the family Violaceae, native to Australia.

== Description ==
The Latin specific epithet hederacea means "like ivy", referring to the leaves which resemble the leaves of Hedera species (which are not closely related).

The flowers are usually rather pale and washed-out looking, the anterior petal (the one at the bottom of the flower when looking face on) is widest towards its apex, and the mature seeds are brown. Well-developed leaves of Viola hederacea are also distinctive – semicircular in outline, about as broad as long, and usually rather dark green above and paler beneath.

== Distribution ==
This small herbaceous perennial is common and widespread in Victoria and Tasmania, along the Great Dividing Range in New South Wales north at least to the Barrington Tops area, in the far south-east of South Australia, and in a small area of the Adelaide Hills between Belair and Mount Lofty.

== Cultivation ==
True Viola hederacea is infrequently grown in gardens. It is a less spectacular plant than the cultivated species Viola banksii, with a more open, less robust habit and less striking flowers. Nevertheless, it is easy to cultivate.

Most ornamental cultivars labelled as Viola hederacea are actually Viola banksii, which was until recently included within V. hederacea but differs in the more richly coloured flowers with an almost circular anterior petal and almost circular leaves with a deep sinus (V. hederacea has paler flowers with an obovate anterior petal and more or less reniform leaves with a broad sinus).
