= Gaudium jingera =

Stringybark tea-tree

Scientific classification
- Kingdom: Plantae
- Clade: Tracheophytes
- Clade: Angiosperms
- Clade: Eudicots
- Clade: Rosids
- Order: Myrtales
- Family: Myrtaceae
- Genus: Gaudium
- Species: G. jingera

Binomial name
- Gaudium jingera (Lyne & Crisp) Peter G.Wilson
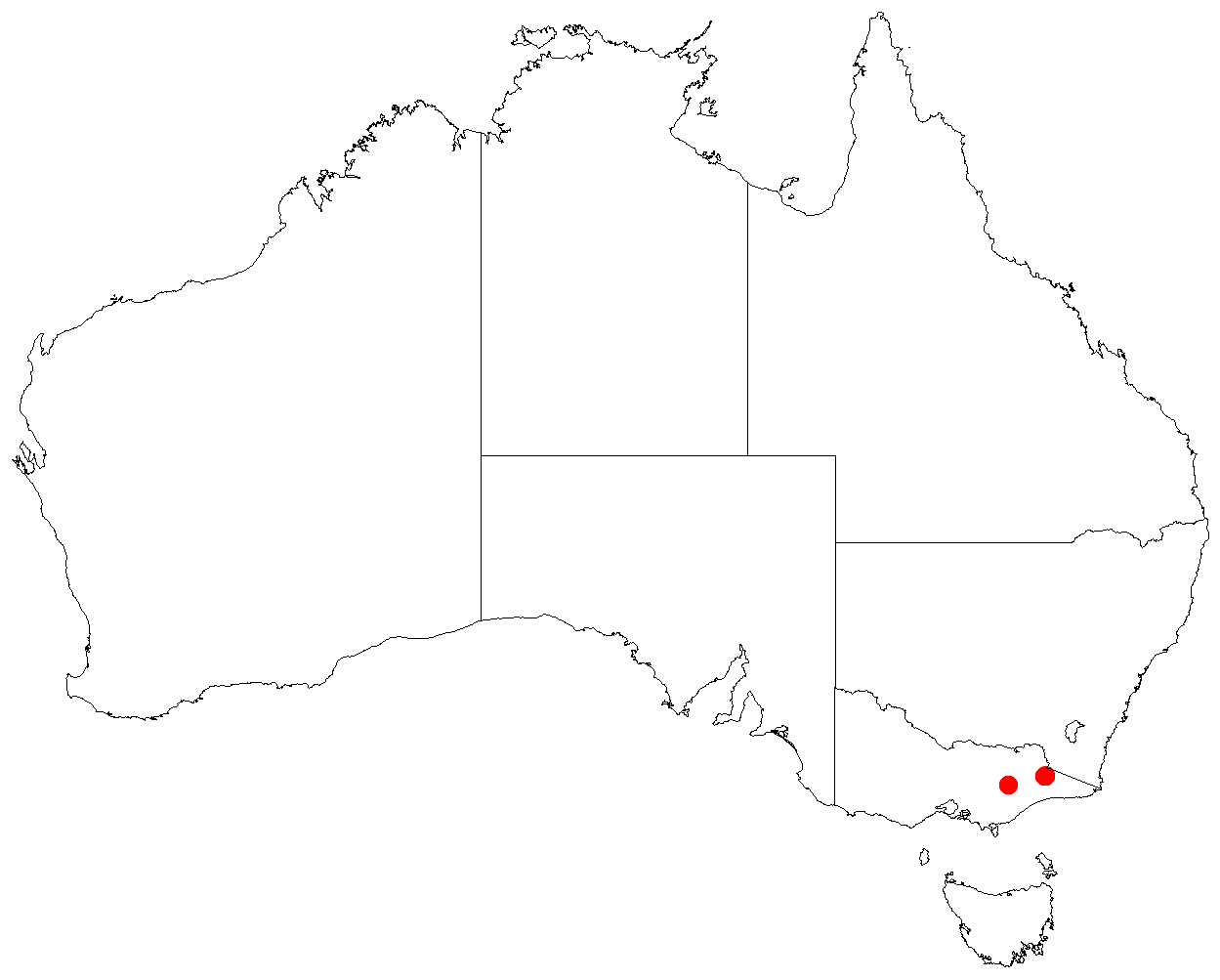
- Occurrence data from AVH

Synonyms
- Leptospermum jingera Lyne & Crisp

Species of shrub

Gaudium jingera, commonly known as the stringybark tea-tree, is a species of flowering plant in the family Myrtaceae and is endemic to Victoria, Australia. It has papery bark on the larger branches, smooth bark on the younger stems, narrowly egg-shaped to elliptical leaves, white flowers and silky-hairy, hemispherical fruit.

== Description ==
Gaudium jingera is a shrub that typically grows to a height of 0.5–2 m (1 ft 8 in – 6 ft 7 in) and has papery bark on the larger branches, smooth bark on the younger stems, the younger stems silky hairy at first. The leaves are narrow egg-shaped to elliptical, 6–10 mm (0.24–0.39 in) long and 2–3.5 mm (0.079–0.138 in) wide on a petiole about 1 mm (0.039 in) long. The flowers are arranged singly or in pairs in leaf axils and are 6–10 mm (0.24–0.39 in) in diameter. The floral cup is silky-hairy, 2.5–3 mm (0.098–0.118 in) long and 1.5–2 mm (0.059–0.079 in) wide and the five sepals are narrow triangular, about 1 mm (0.039 in) long. The five petals are white, circular and 3–4 mm (0.12–0.16 in) wide and there are between ten and thirteen stamens. Flowering mainly occurs from December to January and the fruit is a hemispherical capsule 2–3 mm (0.079–0.118 in) long and wide with the remains of the sepals attached.

== Taxonomy and naming ==
Gaudium jingera was first formally described in 1996 by Andrew Lyne and Michael Crisp in the journal Australian Systematic Botany, based on plant material collected by Lyne from Brumby Point on the Nunniong Plateau in the Alpine National Park in 1994. In 2023, Peter Gordon Wilson transferred the species to the genus Gaudium as G. jingera in the journal Taxon. The specific epithet (jingera) is an Aboriginal word meaning "remote and mountainous, bush-covered country", referring to the habitat of this species.

== Distribution and habitat ==
Stringybark tea-tree grows in low woodland and shrubland and is only known from the type location and The Watchtower in the Snowy Range in Victoria.

== Conservation status ==
This species is listed as "vulnerable" on the Victorian Government Department of Sustainability and Environment's Advisory List of Rare Or Threatened Plants In Victoria.
