= Eucalyptus phoenix =

Brumby mallee-gum

Conservation status
- Data Deficient (IUCN 3.1)

Scientific classification
- Kingdom: Plantae
- Clade: Tracheophytes
- Clade: Angiosperms
- Clade: Eudicots
- Clade: Rosids
- Order: Myrtales
- Family: Myrtaceae
- Genus: Eucalyptus
- Species: E. phoenix

Binomial name
- Eucalyptus phoenix Rule & Forrester

Species of eucalyptus

Eucalyptus phoenix, commonly known as brumby mallee-gum, is a species of mallee that is endemic to a restricted area in Victoria, Australia. It has smooth white to greyish bark, glossy green, lance-shaped adult leaves, flower buds in groups of between five and eleven, white flowers and hemispherical fruit.

== Description ==
Eucalyptus phoenix is a mallee that typically grows to a height of 5 m (16 ft) and forms a lignotuber. It has smooth white to light grey bark that is shed in thin strips and plates. Young plants and coppice regrowth have dull, light green to bluish leaves that are slightly paler on the lower side, egg-shaped to more or less round, 50–80 mm (2.0–3.1 in) long and 15–40 mm (0.59–1.57 in) wide. Adult leaves are the same shade of shiny green on both sides, lance-shaped to egg-shaped, 80–100 mm (3.1–3.9 in) long and 20–30 mm (0.79–1.18 in) wide on a petiole 10–17 mm (0.39–0.67 in) long. The flower buds are arranged in leaf axils in groups of between five and eleven on a thin, unbranched peduncle 8–14 mm (0.31–0.55 in) long, the individual buds on pedicels 3–4 mm (0.12–0.16 in) long. Mature buds are club-shaped, 6–8 mm (0.24–0.31 in) long and 3–4 mm (0.12–0.16 in) wide with a conical operculum 3–5 mm (0.12–0.20 in) long and 3–4 mm (0.12–0.16 in) wide. Flowering occurs from late spring to early summer the flowers are white. The fruit is a woody, hemispherical capsule about 8 mm (0.31 in) long and wide with the valves level with the rim.

== Taxonomy and naming ==
Eucalyptus phoenix was first formally described in 2013 by Kevin Rule and Susan G. Forrester in the journal Muelleria from material collected near Brumby Point. The specific epithet (phoenix) "commemorates the serendipitous discovery of a small amount of the seed of this rare new plant following the apparently all-consuming fire of 2013." Like the fabled Phoenix of Greek mythology, this species arose from the flames.

== Distribution ==
Brumby mallee is only known from a population of fewer than 100 mature plants near Brumby Point on a spur in subalpine woodland at an elevation of about 1,360 m (4,460 ft).

== Conservation status ==
This species is listed as "endangered" in Victoria.

== See also ==
- List of Eucalyptus species
