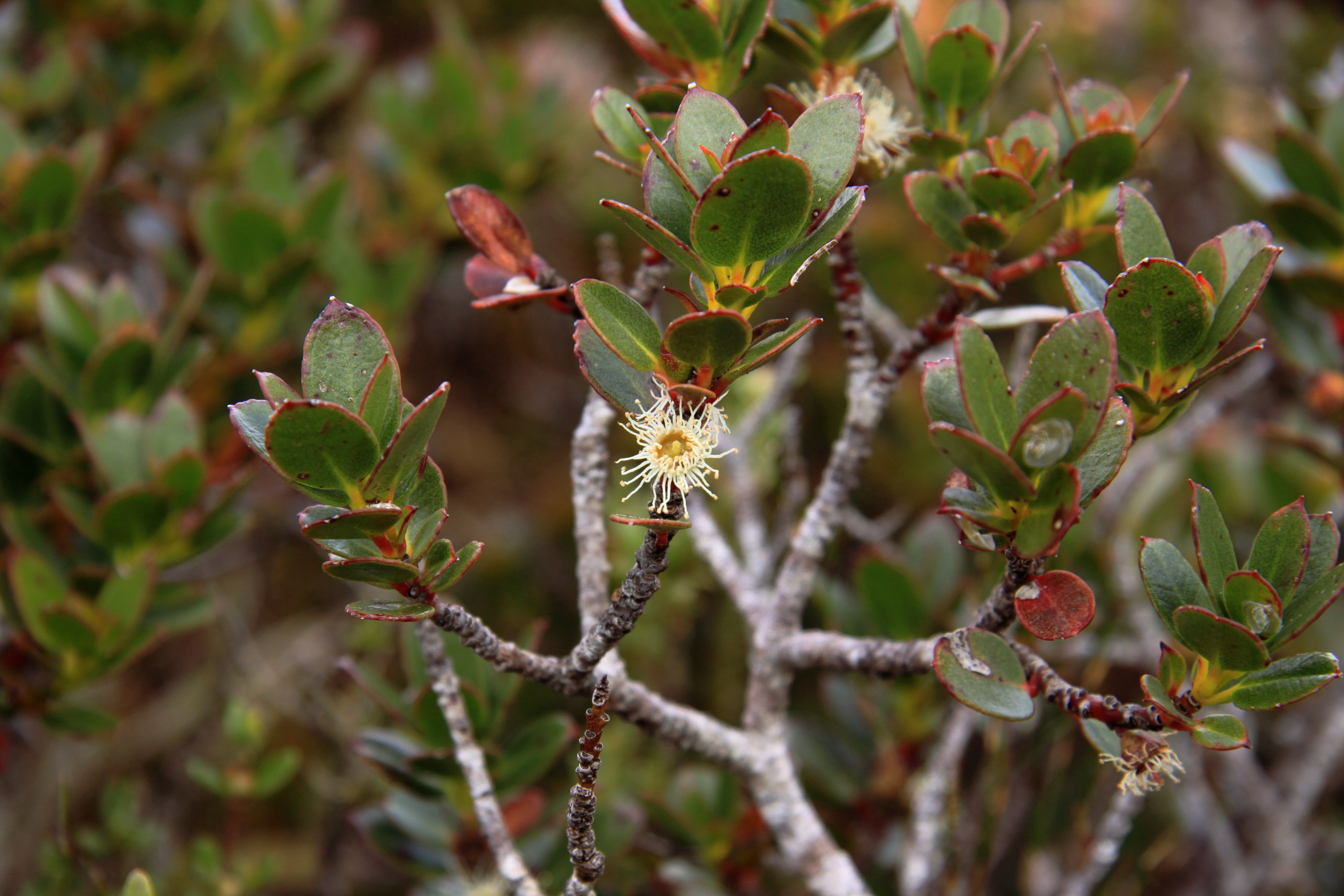

Scientific classification
- Kingdom: Plantae
- Clade: Tracheophytes
- Clade: Angiosperms
- Clade: Eudicots
- Clade: Rosids
- Order: Myrtales
- Family: Myrtaceae
- Genus: Eucalyptus
- Species: E. vernicosa

Binomial name
- Eucalyptus vernicosa Hook.f.

= Eucalyptus vernicosa =

Varnished gum

Species of eucalyptus

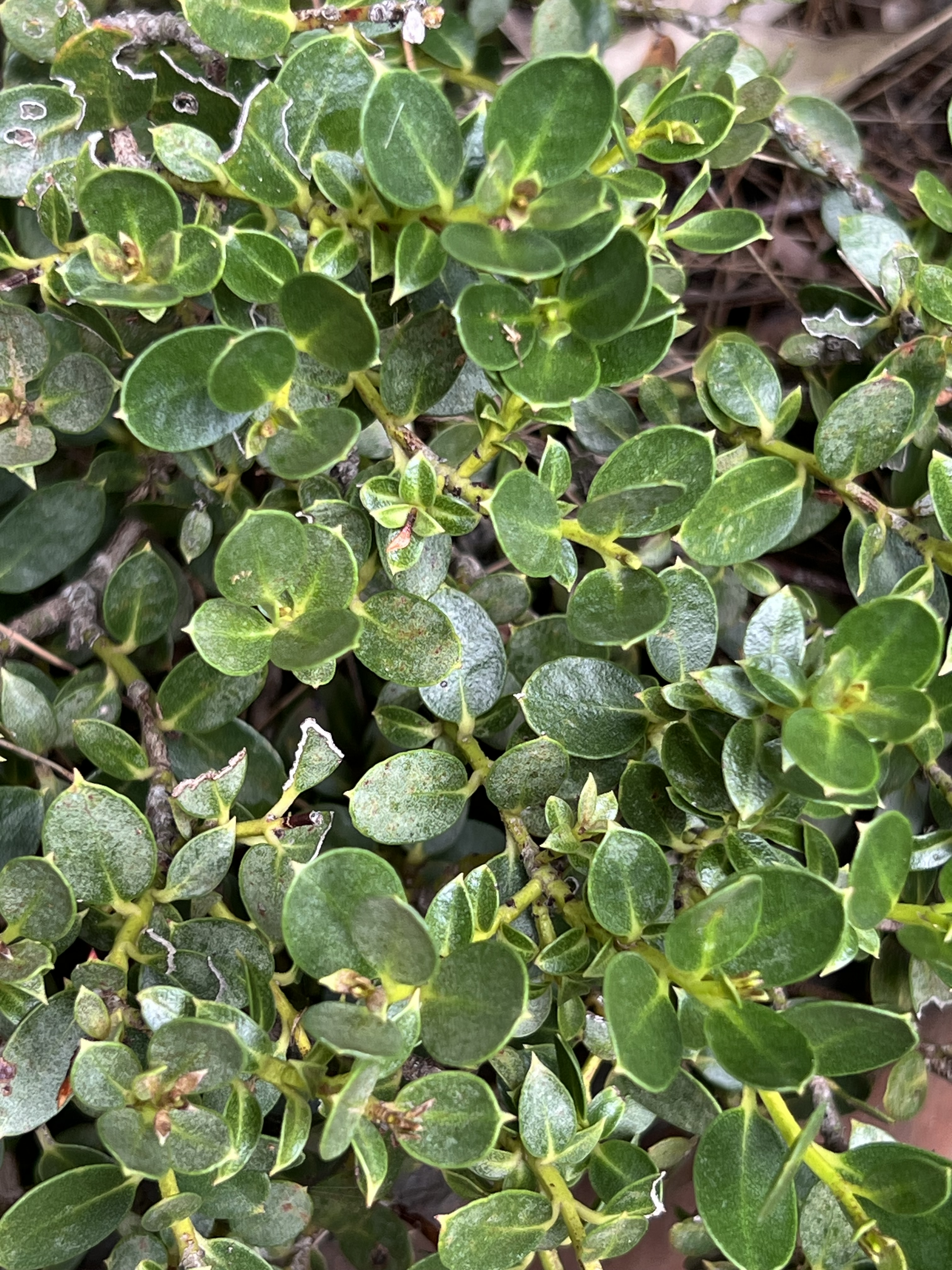
Foliage

Eucalyptus vernicosa, commonly known as varnished gum, is a species of shrub or a mallee that is endemic to mountainous areas of Tasmania. It has smooth greyish bark, crowded, egg-shaped to elliptical or round leaves, flower buds singly or in groups of three in leaf axils, white flowers and hemispherical or bell-shaped fruit.

== Description ==
Eucalyptus vernicosa is a shrub that typically grows to a height of 1 m (3 ft 3 in) or a mallee to 4 m (13 ft) and forms a lignotuber. It has smooth grey or greyish brown bark. Young plants and coppice regrowth have crowded, sessile, glossy green, egg-shaped leaves that are 7–20 mm (0.28–0.79 in) long and 3–15 mm (0.12–0.59 in) wide and arranged in opposite pairs. Adult leaves are crowded, glossy green, egg-shaped to elliptical or round, 10–32 mm (0.39–1.26 in) long and 8–15 mm (0.31–0.59 in) wide with a rounded base, on a petiole 1–8 mm (0.039–0.315 in) long, arranged in opposite pairs or alternately. The flower buds are arranged in groups of three in leaf axils on an unbranched peduncle up to 2 mm (0.079 in) long, the individual buds sessile or almost so. Sometimes two of the buds in a group are lost so the buds appear singly. Mature buds are oval, 8–9 mm (0.31–0.35 in) long and 3–5 mm (0.12–0.20 in) wide, greenish brown and finely wrinkled with a conical operculum that is shorter than the floral cup. Flowering occurs in most months, peaking from December to February and the flowers are white. The fruit is a woody hemispherical or bell-shaped capsule 5–8 mm (0.20–0.31 in) long and 5–9 mm (0.20–0.35 in) wide with the valves near rim level.

== Taxonomy ==
Eucalyptus vernicosa was first formally described in 1847 by Joseph Dalton Hooker in William Jackson Hooker's London Journal of Botany from specimens collected by Ronald Campbell Gunn on "Mount Fatigue, altitude 4000 feet". A specimen of Actinotus bellidoides held in the Royal Botanic Gardens, Kew, also collected on "Mount Fatigue" gives its location as "about 12 to 16 miles S.S.W. off [the St] Clair and about 4000 ft High [Van Dieman's Land]". Mount Arrowsmith is found at approximately this location, and was named "Fatigue Hill" until 1855. The specific epithet is from the Latin word vernicosus meaning "varnished" or "shining", referring to the glossy appearance of the leaves.

== Distribution and habitat ==
Eucalyptus vernicosa is endemic to Tasmania, and is only found in alpine regions in the west to southwest, including Cradle Mountain. It grows between 700m and 1350m above sea level, usually on peaty acid soils on top of quartzite or sandstone bedrock. It is usually found above the tree line, and can be a dominant component of alpine heath communities, along with Richea, Athrotaxis, and Orites. This habitat typically has high average rainfall varying from 1000mm to 2500mm per year, and very cold winters with continuous frosts and snow for several months. The harsh climate and nutritiously poor soils probably explain the small size and tough leaves.

Eucalyptus vernicosa has been traditionally cited as an example of a morphological continuum with E. johnstonii, and E. subcrenulata. A study from Mount Arrowsmith showed a strong relationship within those three species, linking altitude with changes in glaucousness, leaf morphology, growth rates, habit, capsule shape, bark thickness and degree of frost resistance. It was suggested that they represented close relatives of one species that was diverging to adapt to an environmental cline. However more recent genetic studies show that E. vernicosa is more distantly related to the E. johnstonii/E. subcrenulata complex, and the apparent morphological clinal intergradation between E. vernicosa and E. subcrenulata is probably a result of parallel evolution.

== Uses ==
=== Use in horticulture ===
A number of Tasmanian alpine Eucalypts, including E. vernicosa, are grown as ornamental trees and shrubs in Europe, and especially in the United Kingdom, due to their evergreen habit and similarity of climate.

=== Essential oils ===
In the early 20th century E. vernicosa was harvested for its oil, which was believed to have medicinal properties.
