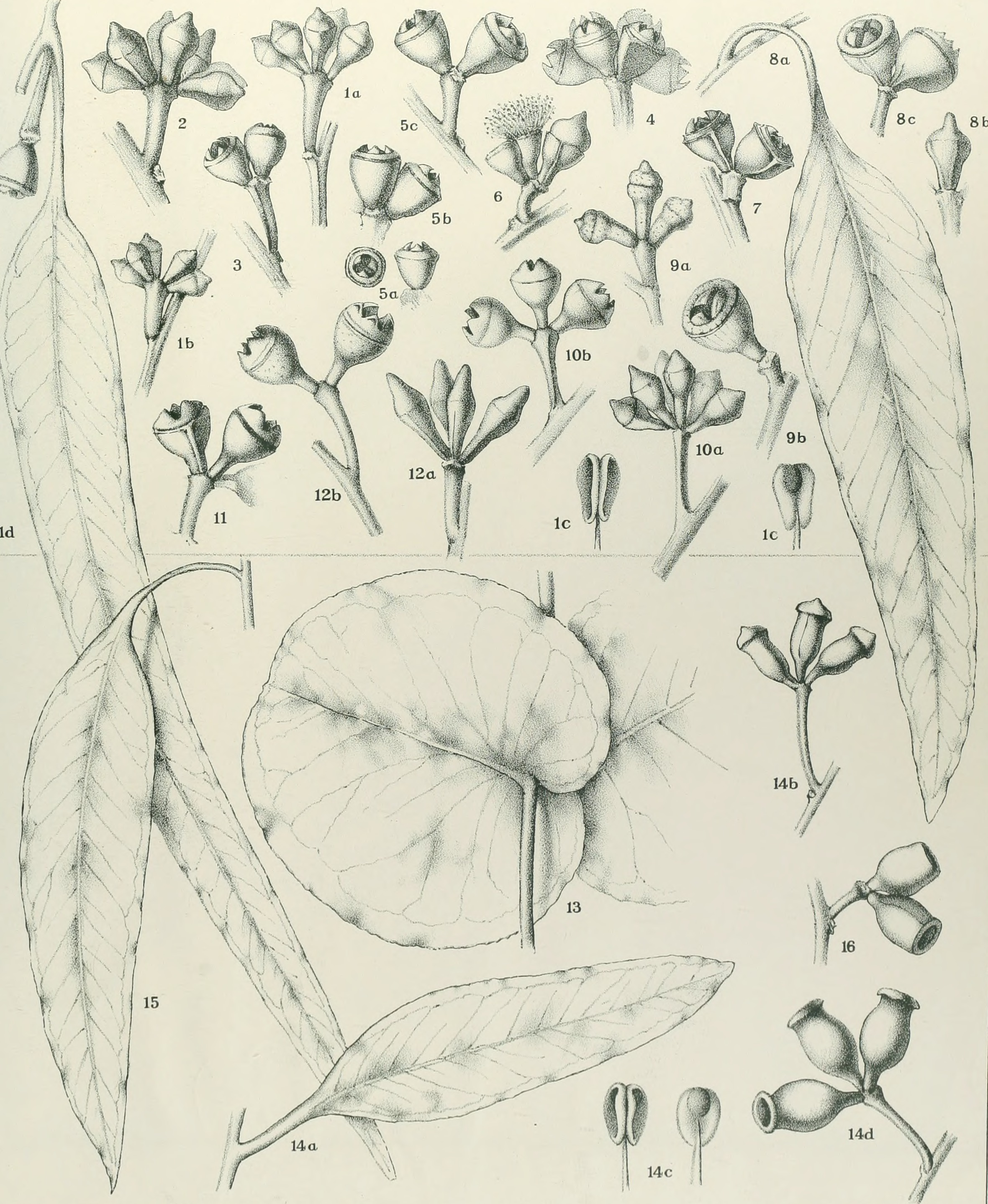
- Sketches of E. urnigera from A critical revision of the genus Eucalyptus (1903-33).

Scientific classification
- Kingdom: Plantae
- Clade: Tracheophytes
- Clade: Angiosperms
- Clade: Eudicots
- Clade: Rosids
- Order: Myrtales
- Family: Myrtaceae
- Genus: Eucalyptus
- Species: E. urnigera

Binomial name
- Eucalyptus urnigera Hook.f.

Synonyms
- Eucalyptus urnigera var. elongata Rodway; Eucalyptus urnigera Hook.f. var. urnigera

= Eucalyptus urnigera =

Urn gum

Species of eucalyptus

Eucalyptus urnigera, commonly known as urn tree, is a species of small to medium-sized tree that is endemic to Tasmania. It has smooth bark, lance-shaped or elliptical leaves, flower buds in groups of three, white flowers and urn-shaped fruit.

== Description ==
Eucalyptus urnigera is an evergreen tree that typically grows to a height of 5–15 m (16–49 ft), although specimens up to 45 m (148 ft) have been recorded in sheltered lower altitude positions. The spread of the tree is typically to 10 m (33 ft). The tree has a lignotuber and often a gnarled appearance in exposed areas, however, in more sheltered and lower altitude sites it grows tall and straight. The bark is smooth, mottled grey, orange-tan to olive green over cream and is shed in flakes and the branchlets are often glaucous. Young plants and coppice regrowth have leaves that are sessile, heart-shaped to round, 12–28 mm (0.47–1.10 in) long and 13–28 mm (0.51–1.10 in) wide, arranged in opposite pairs with stem-clasping bases and finely notched or scalloped edges. The leaves range from being dark green in sheltered environments to glaucous in exposed areas. Adult leaves are arranged alternately, the same shade of green on both sides, lance-shaped to broadly lance-shaped or elliptical, 35–90 mm (1.4–3.5 in) long and 10–28 mm (0.39–1.10 in) wide, tapering to a petiole 7–30 mm (0.28–1.18 in) long. The lateral veins diverge at angles of 25-60 degrees.

The flower buds are arranged in leaf axils in groups of three on a down-turned peduncle 5–25 mm (0.20–0.98 in) long, the individual buds on pedicels 1–13 mm (0.039–0.512 in) long. Mature buds are cylindrical or urn-shaped and often glaucous, 10–13 mm (0.39–0.51 in) long and 5–7 mm (0.20–0.28 in) wide with a flattened hemispherical, slightly beaked operculum that is wider than the floral cup at the join. Flowering occurs in most months with a peak from April to July, and the flowers are white. The fruit is a woody, urn-shaped capsule 9–15 mm (0.35–0.59 in) long and 6–11 mm (0.24–0.43 in) wide with the valves below rim level.

=== Variation in leaf colour ===
Unlike many eucalypts, E. urnigera displays a morphological unity across the species with one important exception. There is a significant variation in the level of glaucicity (waxiness) between E. urnigera in lower altitude shady forest and those trees in the more exposed higher altitude sites. This was studied by Barber and Jackson in 1957 and followed up in later studies. E. urnigera at lower altitudes (560–670 m) and in sheltered sites are uniformly green whereas at higher altitude (950–1050 m), E. urnigera is uniformly glaucous. The transition from one phenotype to the other is most clearly seen on a steep section of walking track below the Chalet on the Pinnacle Road. Within 200 m altitude the transition is made. It is believed that the lower light conditions of the relatively closed sub-alpine forest favours the green leaved phenotype, being able to more efficiently photosynthesize in lower light conditions than the glaucous phenotype. However, at the more exposed higher altitude where there is more direct sunlight the glaucous phenotype is favoured. The wax coating reflects infra redlight and probably assists in protecting the tree from frost. Further research has explored reflectance of ultraviolet and photosynthetically active radiation.

== Taxonomy ==
The species was first formally described by the nineteenth century English botanist, Joseph Hooker, in William Jackson Hooker's London Journal of Botany in 1847, from specimens collected by the colonial botanist Ronald Campbell Gunn from Mount Wellington and Lake Echo. The specific epithet (urnigera) comes from the Latin urna, meaning "urn" and gero, meaning "to bear". It relates to the distinctive urn shaped buds and seed capsules.

== Distribution and habitat ==
Eucalyptus urnigera is an endemic Tasmanian alpine eucalypt of the sub genus Symphomyrtus and is the dominant eucalypt species at altitudes from 600 to 1,000 metres (1,969 to 3,281 ft) on moist but well drained dolerite slopes and talus. It is restricted to the mountains of south eastern Tasmania, the Mount Wellington range, Mount Field and isolated pockets from Tylers Hill near Southport, 100 kilometres (62 mi) south of Hobart, north to Alma Tier near Interlaken and Mount Seymour east of Oatlands in central Tasmania and a small population on the eastern side of Maria Island off the east coast. Typically, it is found below the range of E. coccifera (snow gum) and above the mixed and wet sclerophyll forests of the lower slopes although it will grow within both vegetation types.

== Ecology ==
The flowers of E. urnigera are pollinated by birds such as yellow-throated honeyeater (Lichenostomus flavicollis), black-headed honeyeater (Melithreptus affinis) and strong-billed honeyeater (Melithreptus validirostris).

== Use in horticulture ==
Eucalyptus urnigera does not have any commercial use as a timber tree in Tasmania but it is prized as a specimen tree in cooler regions of the United States of America and in the British Isles. Grafton Nursery in Worcestershire (UK) considers it superior to E.gunni, a eucalypt commonly grown in the UK. Its colourful bark and foliage make it a valuable as a garden ornamental. Its lignotuber enables coppicing and is proposed as one of the varieties for United Kingdom firewood production.

== See also ==
- List of Eucalyptus species

== Footnotes ==
- Williams, K.J, and Potts, B.M., The Natural Distribution of Eucalyptus Species in Tasmania, Cooperative Research Centre for Temperate Hardwood Forestry, Department of Plant Science, University of Tasmania, Hobart 7001, p 115, based on description in Curtis, W. M., & Morris, D. L., The Students Flora of Tasmania, Part 1, second edition 1975, Hobart, p 217
- Reid, J.M., Hill, R.S., Brown, M.J., Hovenden, M.J. Eds, Vegetation of Tasmania, Hobart, 2005, p 203 quoting work of Savva, M., Potts, B. M., Reid, J.B. (1988). The breeding system and gene flow in Eucalyptus urnigera. In ‘Pollination’ ‘88’. (Eds R.B. Knots, M.B. Sing and J.L. Troiani) pp 176–182 (Plant Cell Biology Research Centre: Melbourne.)
- Close, D.C., Davidson, N.J., Shields, C.B., and Wiltshire, R., Reflectance and Phenolics of green and glaucous leaves of Eucalyptus urnigera, Australian Journal of Botany 55(5) 561-567
- Barber, H.N., and Jackson,.W. D. (1957), Natural Selection in Eucalyptus, Nature 179, pp 1267–1269, cited in Vegetation of Tasmania.
- Birdlife of Wellington Park
