= Suzanne Mary Prober =

Australian botanist

- Born: 31 July 1964 (age 62); Hobart, Tasmania, Australia
- Education: University of Sydney, Bachelor of Science in Agriculture; Australia National University, PhD in Vegetation Ecology
- Occupations: Botanist, ecologist

Suzanne Mary Prober (born in Hobart on 31 July 1964) is an Australian botanist and ecologist.

She received her Bachelor of Science in Agriculture (Honors) from the University of Sydney in 1985 and a PhD in Vegetation Ecology from the Australian National University in 1990.

She is a principal research scientist with CSIRO Land and Water in Perth, Western Australia. Understanding, controlling and restoring the natural diversity, ecosystem function and resilience of plant groups are Prober's main research interests. She focuses on temperate eucalypt woodlands and remnant vegetation in versatile landscapes. Prober currently leads the Great Western Ecosystems Research Network, and is Facility Director of TERN (Terrestrial Ecosystem Research Network) OzFlux. OzFlux is responsible for maintaining datastreams that measure the exchange of energy, carbon and water between the atmosphere and important Australian ecosystems.

The standard author abbreviation Prober is used to indicate this person as the author when citing a botanical name.

== Research interests ==
Prober's research focuses on:

- Adaptation of natural ecosystems to climate change
- Ecosystem function and management
- Fire ecology
- Aboriginal ecological knowledge
- Conservation and biodiversity
- Plant-soil interactions; mycorrhizae
- Invasive species ecology
- Temperate eucalypt woodlands

== Publications ==
Prober's research has resulted in over 100 publications since 2009 which can be found in the semi-complete list at http://people.csiro.au/P/S/Suzanne-Prober/PublicationsHistory.aspx.
