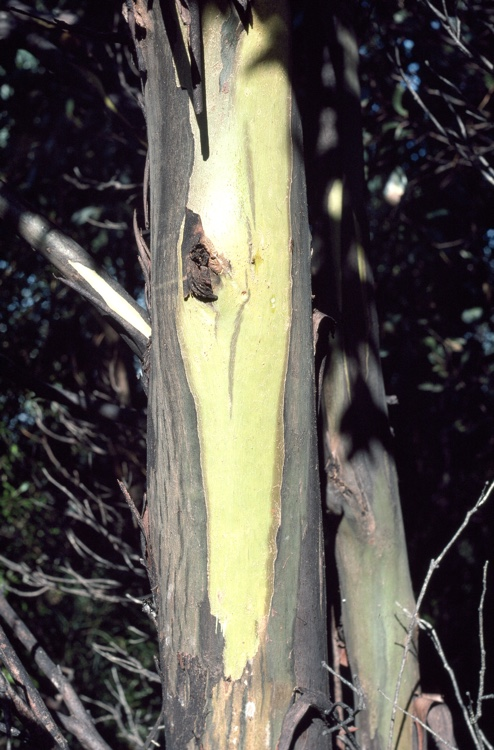
- Trunk of E. johnstonii

Conservation status
- Near Threatened (IUCN 3.1)

Scientific classification
- Kingdom: Plantae
- Clade: Tracheophytes
- Clade: Angiosperms
- Clade: Eudicots
- Clade: Rosids
- Order: Myrtales
- Family: Myrtaceae
- Genus: Eucalyptus
- Species: E. johnstonii

Binomial name
- Eucalyptus johnstonii Maiden

= Eucalyptus johnstonii =

Tasmanian yellow gum

Species of eucalyptus

Eucalyptus johnstonii, commonly known as Tasmanian yellow gum, is a species of medium-sized to tall tree endemic to Tasmania. It has smooth yellow to greenish bark, lance-shaped adult leaves, flower buds in groups of three, white flowers and hemispherical or bell-shaped fruit.

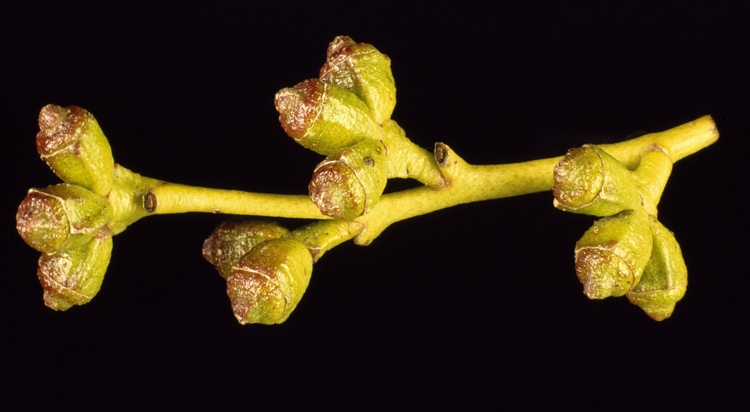
Flower buds

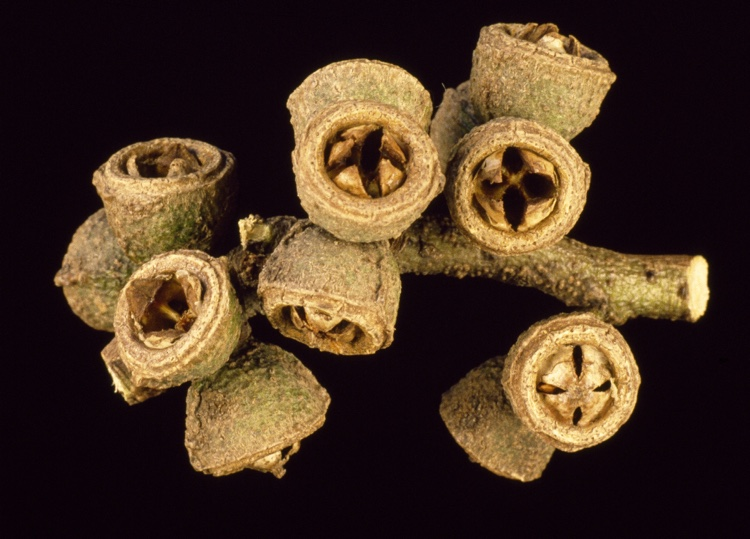
Fruit

== Description ==
Eucalyptus johnstonii is a tree that typically grows to a height of 40–50 m (130–160 ft) and forms a lignotuber. It has smooth yellow to brownish or greenish bark, sometimes with persistent fibrous bark near the base. Young plants and coppice regrowth have stems that are more or less square in cross-section with a broad wing on each corner and sessile. The juvenile leaves are egg-shaped to almost round, 25–60 mm (0.98–2.36 in) long, 13–45 mm (0.51–1.77 in) wide and arranged in opposite pairs. Adult leaves are lance-shaped or curved, more or less the same glossy green on both sides, 65–150 mm (2.6–5.9 in) long and 20–40 mm (0.79–1.57 in) wide on a petiole 15–30 mm (0.59–1.18 in) long. The flower buds are arranged in leaf axils on a thick, unbranched peduncle 3–10 mm (0.12–0.39 in) long, the individual buds sessile. Mature buds are oblong to diamond-shaped, 8–11 mm (0.31–0.43 in) long and 6–9 mm (0.24–0.35 in) wide with a rounded operculum with a central knob. Flowering mainly occurs from February to April and the flowers are white. The fruit is a woody hemispherical or bell-shaped capsule 7–10 mm (0.28–0.39 in) long and 9–13 mm (0.35–0.51 in) wide with the valves protruding above the rim of the fruit.

== Taxonomy and naming ==
Eucalyptus johnstonii was first formally described in 1922 by Joseph Maiden and the description was published in Volume 6 of his book, A Critical Revision of the Genus Eucalyptus. The specific epithet honours Robert Mackenzie Johnston.

Maiden noted that the species had already been described in 1886 by Thomas Bather Moore. Moore gave it the name Eucalyptus muelleri, a name that was already used for a different species, making it an illegitimate name. Maiden gave a further description and a diagram of the same species in Volume 3 of his book.

== Distribution and habitat ==
Tasmanian yellow gum grows in tall forest on mountains and plateaus in south-eastern Tasmania including on Mount Wellington, Bruny Island, and the Tasman Peninsula.

== See also ==
- List of Eucalyptus species
