= List of Iowa state forests =

This is a list of Iowa state forests.

| Name | Location (of main entrance) | Major forest | Area (ac) | Area (ha) |
|---|---|---|---|---|
| Backbone State Forest | Delaware County | No | 186 | 75 |
| Barkley State Forest | Boone County | No | 40 | 16 |
| Gifford State Forest | Pottawattamie County | No | – | – |
| Holst State Forest | Boone County | No | 314 | 127 |
| Loess Hills State Forest | Harrison County, Monona County | Yes | 10,600 | 4,300 |
| Pilot Mound State Forest | Boone County | No | 34 | 14 |
| Shimek State Forest | Lee County, Van Buren County | Yes | 9,148 | 3,702 |
| Stephens State Forest | Lucas County | Yes | 14,112 | 5,711 |
| White Pine Hollow State Forest | Dubuque County | No | 712 | 288 |
| Yellow River State Forest | Allamakee County | Yes | 8,503 | 3,441 |

== See also ==
- List of national forests of the United States
