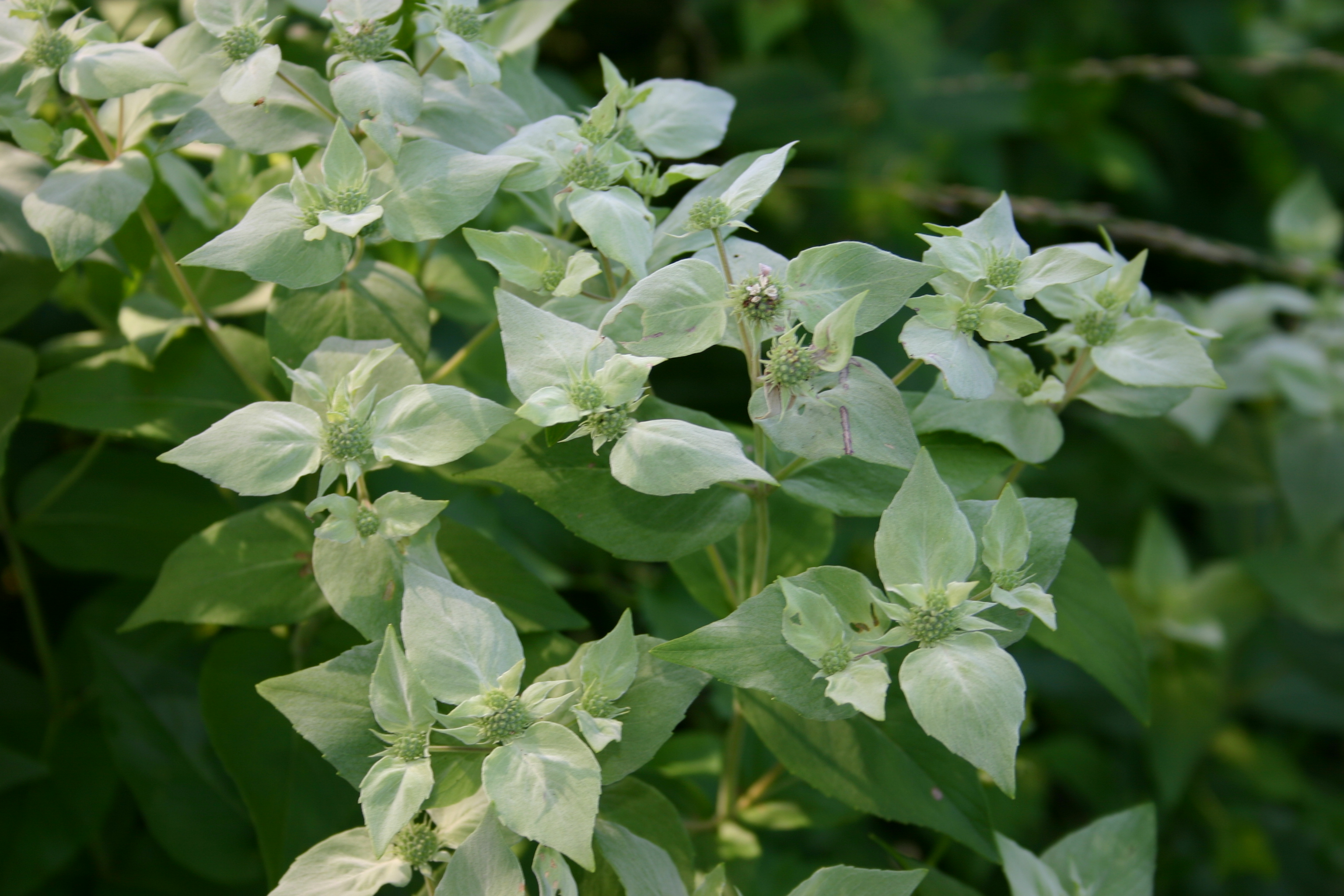
- Pycnanthemum muticum flowering heads and bracts

Conservation status
- Secure (NatureServe)

Scientific classification
- Kingdom: Plantae
- Clade: Embryophytes
- Clade: Tracheophytes
- Clade: Angiosperms
- Clade: Eudicots
- Clade: Asterids
- Order: Lamiales
- Family: Lamiaceae
- Genus: Pycnanthemum
- Species: P. muticum

Binomial name
- Pycnanthemum muticum (Michx.) Pers.

Synonyms
- Brachystemum muticum Michx.; Koellia mutica (Michx.) Britton ex Small & Vail; Pycnanthemum arkansanum Fresen.; Pycnanthemum ovatum Nutt. ex Benth.; Pycnanthemum pilosum var. leptodon Benth.; Thymus serratus Poir.

= Pycnanthemum muticum =

North American species of mint plant

Pycnanthemum muticum, commonly known as clustered mountain mint, is a plant from the genus Pycnanthemum that is native to the eastern United States. It grows in well-watered dappled woodlands and meadows in the wild. It is also planted in gardens because it is highly attractive to butterflies and other pollinators.

== Description ==
Pycnanthemum muticum is a herbaceous perennial plant that grows to 40–100 centimeters (16–39 in) in height. Stems branch quite often, with the lower branches being short and leafy and upper ones nearly reaching the same height as the main stem. The stems have the typical square cross section characteristic of mints. The plants stand upright (erect) and spread by adapted underground stems (rhizomes). The ends of the stems are covered in very small hairs towards their ends.

The leaves are larger towards the base of the plant, have toothed edges, and are directly attached to the main stem (sessile). They vary in shape from rounded rectangles (oblong leaves) to being somewhat egg-shaped lance points (ovate-lanceolate). At their largest they are 4–7 centimeters (1.6–2.8 in) long. The leaves of Pycnanthemum muticum are fuzzy in texture with very tiny hairs and are gray-green. They also have very distinct veins; this characteristic, along with the compactness of the flowering heads, helps to distinguish this species from others of its genus.

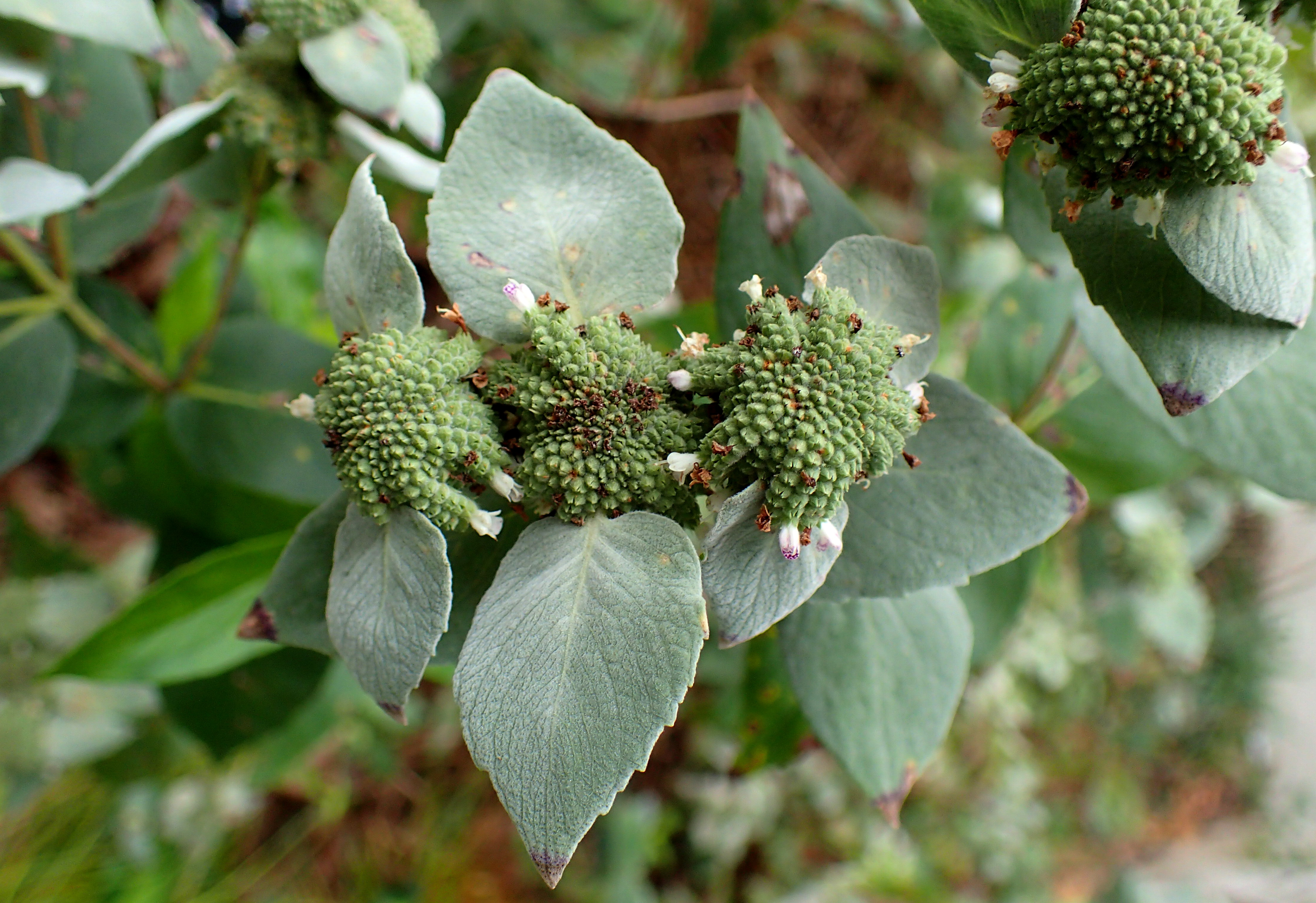
Pycnanthemum muticum flowers

The flowers of Pycnanthemum muticum are small and densely packed into heads but surrounded by large silvery colored bracts. They are mostly located at the ends of the stems, but a few will be found in the joints of the leaves and stems (the axils). The tiny petals are pink to white in color. The flowering heads measure 8–15 millimeters (0.31–0.59 in) in width and may bloom from July to September.

It is an intensely fragrant plant that strongly smells like the stereotypical mint genus. Plant colonies slowly expand and are long-lived.

== Taxonomy ==
Pycnanthemum muticum was given its first scientific description in 1803 by André Michaux, who named it Brachystemum muticum. In 1806, it was moved to Pycnanthemum with its present name by Christiaan Hendrik Persoon. An additional move was proposed by John Kunkel Small and Anna Murray Vail using the work of Nathaniel Lord Britton in 1893, naming it Koellia mutica, but this is generally regarded as a taxonomic synonym. As of 2024, Pycnanthemum muticum is listed as the correct name by Plants of the World Online, World Flora Online, and the USDA Natural Resources Conservation Service PLANTS database.

=== Names ===
Pycnanthemum is a compound word composed of the Greek words pyknos (meaning "dense", "tight", or "close-packed") and anthos (meaning "flower"). The species name, muticum, is botanical Latin meaning "blunt". From its appearance and a common name for the genus, it is called "clustered mountain mint". It has also been given the common names "short-toothed mountain mint", "hairy mountain-mint", or simply "mountain mint"; however, the name "mountain mint" is often used as the common name for the genus or for other species in it such as Pycnanthemum virginianum.

== Range and habitat ==
This species is found in scattered locations from Florida to Maine on the east coast of the United States and as far west as Texas and Michigan. It is most common in the eastern US in the Appalachian Mountains, in the eastern half of Pennsylvania, New Jersey, Connecticut, Massachusetts, Vermont, and New Hampshire. To the west, it is also quite common in Arkansas and Louisiana.

Pycnanthemum muticum may be found growing wild in woods, swamps, thickets, or fields, usually on moist, freely draining soils.

== Ecology and conservation ==
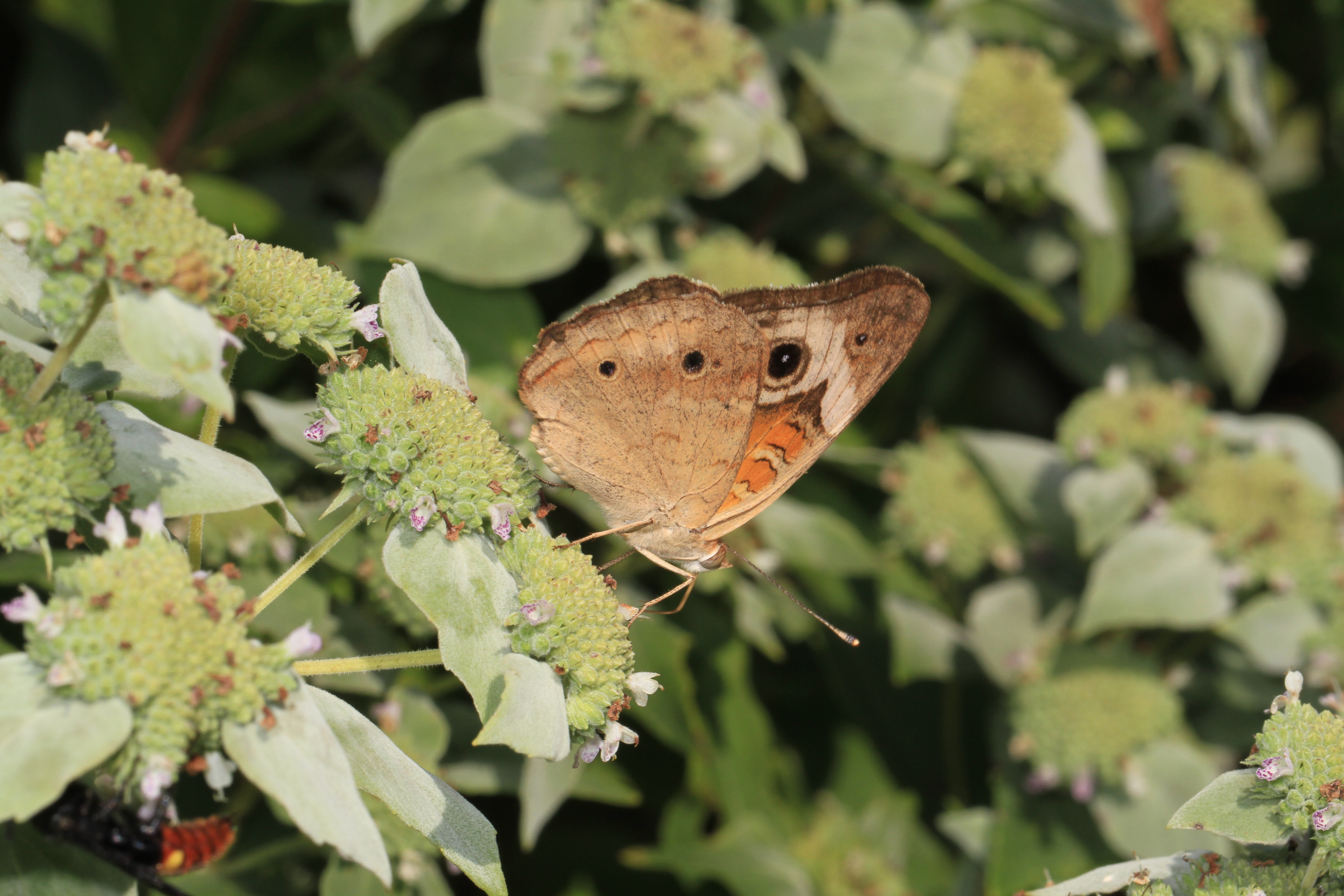
Common buckeye on mountain mint

Along with plants like wild bergamot and dense blazing star, clustered mountain mint is considered high in nectar resources and attracts a diverse set of pollinators. Its flowers are attractive to butterflies such as the gray hairstreak, red-banded hairstreak, eastern tailed-blue, spring azure, and monarch butterfly.

The conservation status of Pycnanthemum muticum was last reviewed by NatureServe in 1985. At that time, they rated it as "globally secure" (G5), meaning they did not find any significant threats and the species is widespread. They have evaluated it at the state level as "apparently secure" (S4) in New Jersey, North Carolina, and Virginia. In Delaware, Georgia, and Ohio they considered it to be "vulnerable" (S3). They also found it to be "imperiled" (S2) in three states, Mississippi, Missouri, and New York, and "critically imperiled" (S1) in four more, Kentucky, Michigan, West Virginia, and Vermont. They thought it may be extirpated from the state of Maine.

== Cultivation ==
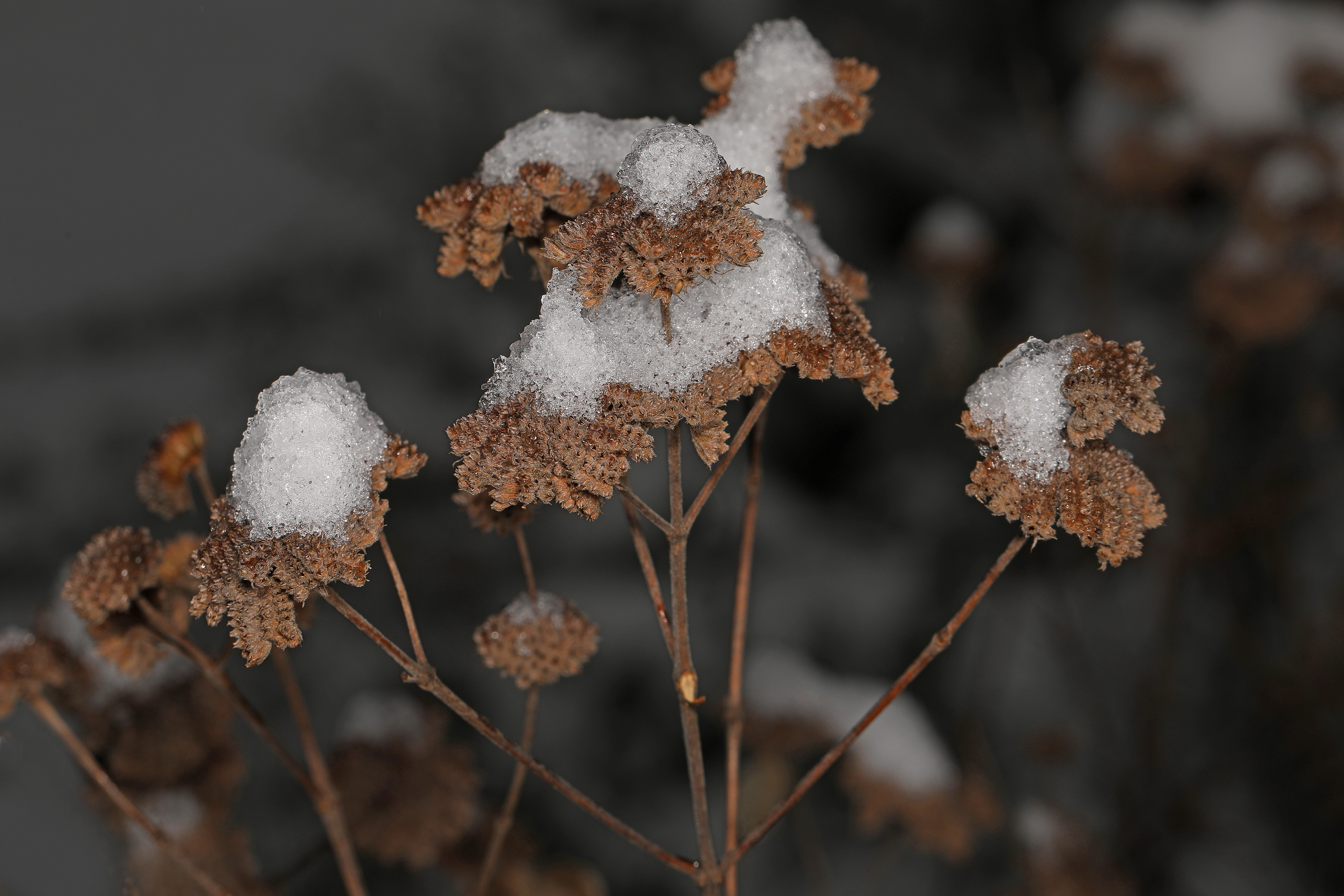
Clustered mountain mint, dry seed heads and stems in winter

Clustered mountain mint is sometimes grown in gardens, particularly ones emphasizing native plants or to benefit pollinators. Many different kinds of insects are attracted to the strong nectar flow including bees, wasps, moths, and butterflies.

They are more valued for the silver colored bracts which last much longer than the blooms. The seedheads dry out and persist over the winter, providing light cover and nesting material to birds.

Clustered mountain mint will grow in full sun or partial shade. It prefers moist soils and has very little drought tolerance. The zone 5 is the minimum USDA hardiness zone where plants will survive the winter. Gardeners propagate plants by division, taking young vigorous growth from the edge of a clump early in the spring.
