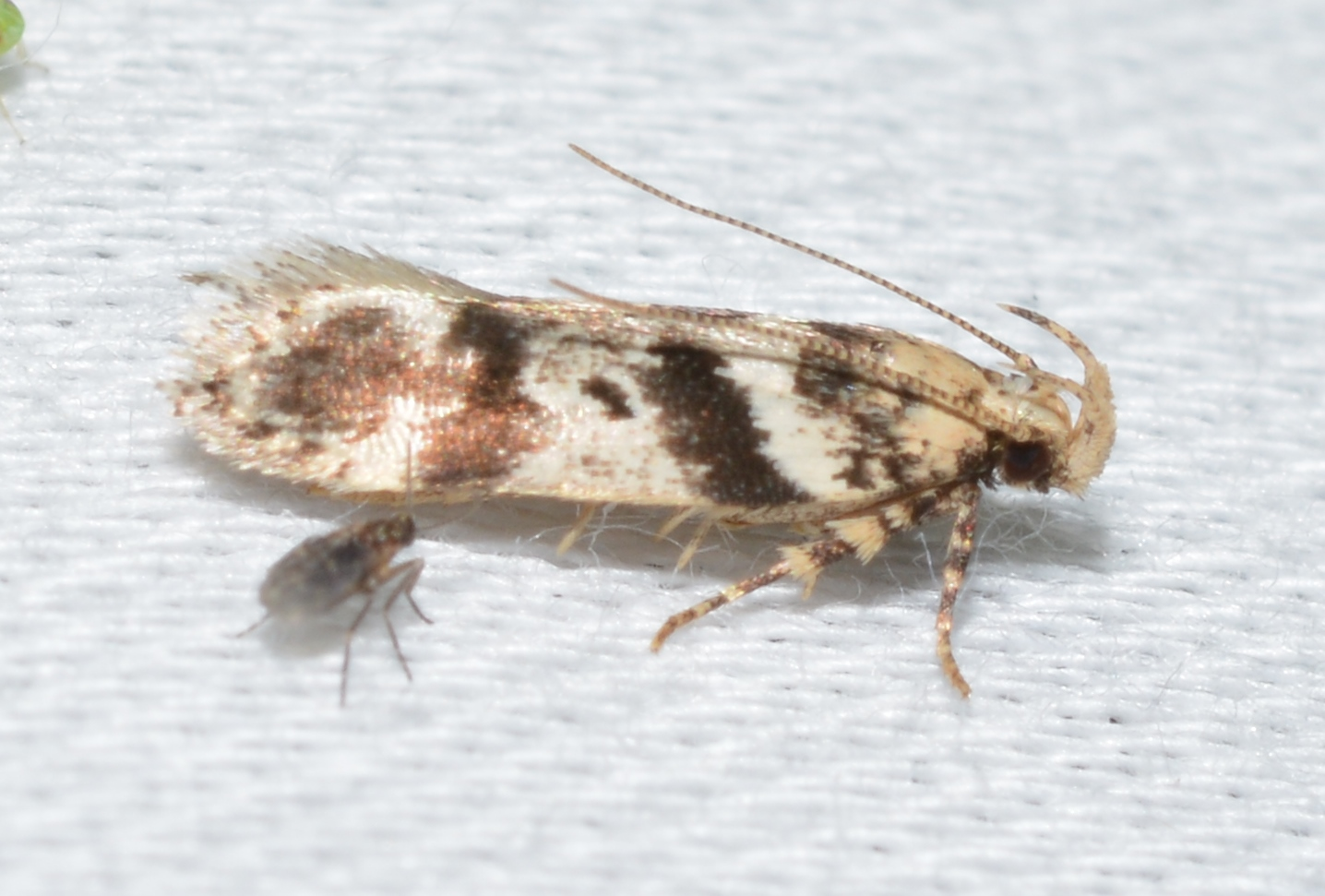

Scientific classification
- Kingdom: Animalia
- Phylum: Arthropoda
- Clade: Pancrustacea
- Class: Insecta
- Order: Lepidoptera
- Family: Gelechiidae
- Genus: Chionodes
- Species: C. pseudofondella

Binomial name
- Chionodes pseudofondella (Busck, 1906)

Synonyms
- Gelechia pseudofondella Busck, 1906

= Chionodes pseudofondella =

Species of moth

Chionodes pseudofondella is a moth in the family Gelechiidae. It is found in North America, where it has been recorded from New Hampshire, southern Ontario, Nebraska, Arkansas and North Carolina.

The wingspan is about 14 mm. The forewings are ochreous white, with dark blackish-brown markings. The extreme base of the costal and dorsal edge is black and there is a small blackish-brown spot near the base, as well as a large outwardly-oblique costal streak from the basal third of the costa reaching to the fold. Beyond the middle of the wing is an ill-defined dark-brown transverse fascia, reaching the dorsal edge. On the middle of the wing, between these two large markings, is a small blackish-brown spot. The apical fourth of the wing is heavily overlaid with dark brown. The hindwings are light fuscous.

The larvae feed on Origanum vulgare, Pycnanthemum flexuosum and Eupatorium hyssopifolium.
