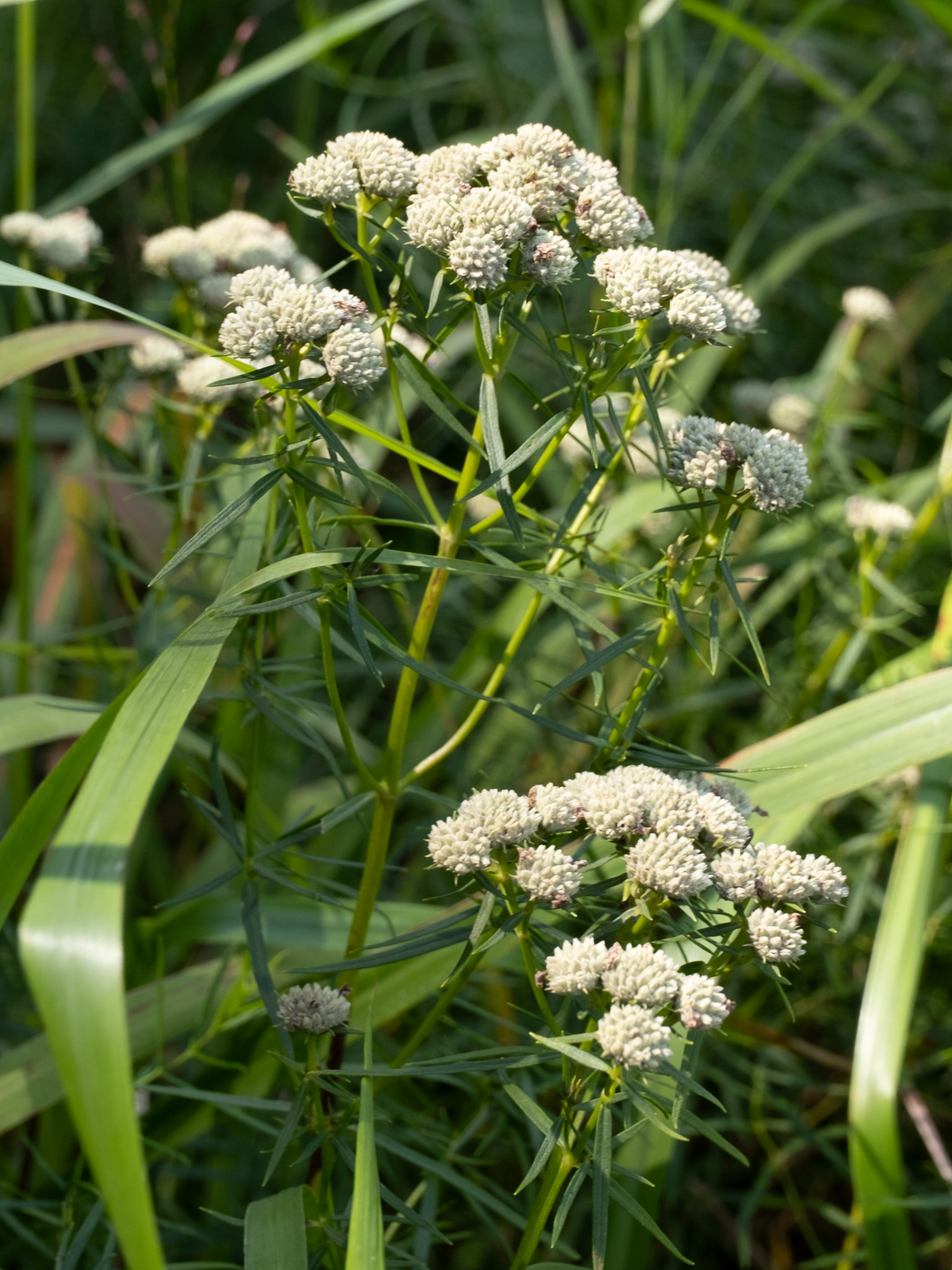

Conservation status
- Secure (NatureServe)

Scientific classification
- Kingdom: Plantae
- Clade: Tracheophytes
- Clade: Angiosperms
- Clade: Eudicots
- Clade: Asterids
- Order: Lamiales
- Family: Lamiaceae
- Genus: Pycnanthemum
- Species: P. tenuifolium

Binomial name
- Pycnanthemum tenuifolium Schrad.

Synonyms
- Pycnanthemum flexuosum auct. non Walter: (misidentified); Pycnanthemum linifolium

= Pycnanthemum tenuifolium =

Species of flowering plant

Pycnanthemum tenuifolium, the narrowleaf mountainmint, slender mountainmint, common horsemint or Virginia thyme, is a perennial herbaceous plant in the mint family, Lamiaceae. It is native to central and eastern North America.

== Description ==
Pycnanthemum tenuifolium is an herbaceous plant with wiry, green, branching stems from 0.6–0.9 metres (2–3 ft) tall. As with other mints, the stems are square in cross section. Leaves are narrow, opposite, and simple, measuring up to 5 centimetres (2 in) long and less than 0.64 centimetres (.25 in) wide. The flowers are white, borne in dense, half-round heads in summer, June through September. Unlike most plants in the genus, the foliage has a very faint mint fragrance.

== Etymology ==
Pycnanthemum is based on the Greek words pyknós (dense) and ανθέμιον (flower). Tenuifolium is from the Latin words tenuis (thin) and folium (leaf).

== Distribution and habitat ==
P. tenuifolium is native to central and eastern North America, from Texas in the west to Maine in the east, Canada in the North, and Florida in the south. Native habitats include dry, open, rocky woods, dry prairies and fields, roadsides, pine barrens, streams, and open wet thickets.

== Ecology ==
The plant attracts native bees, bumblebees, honey bees, and butterflies.
