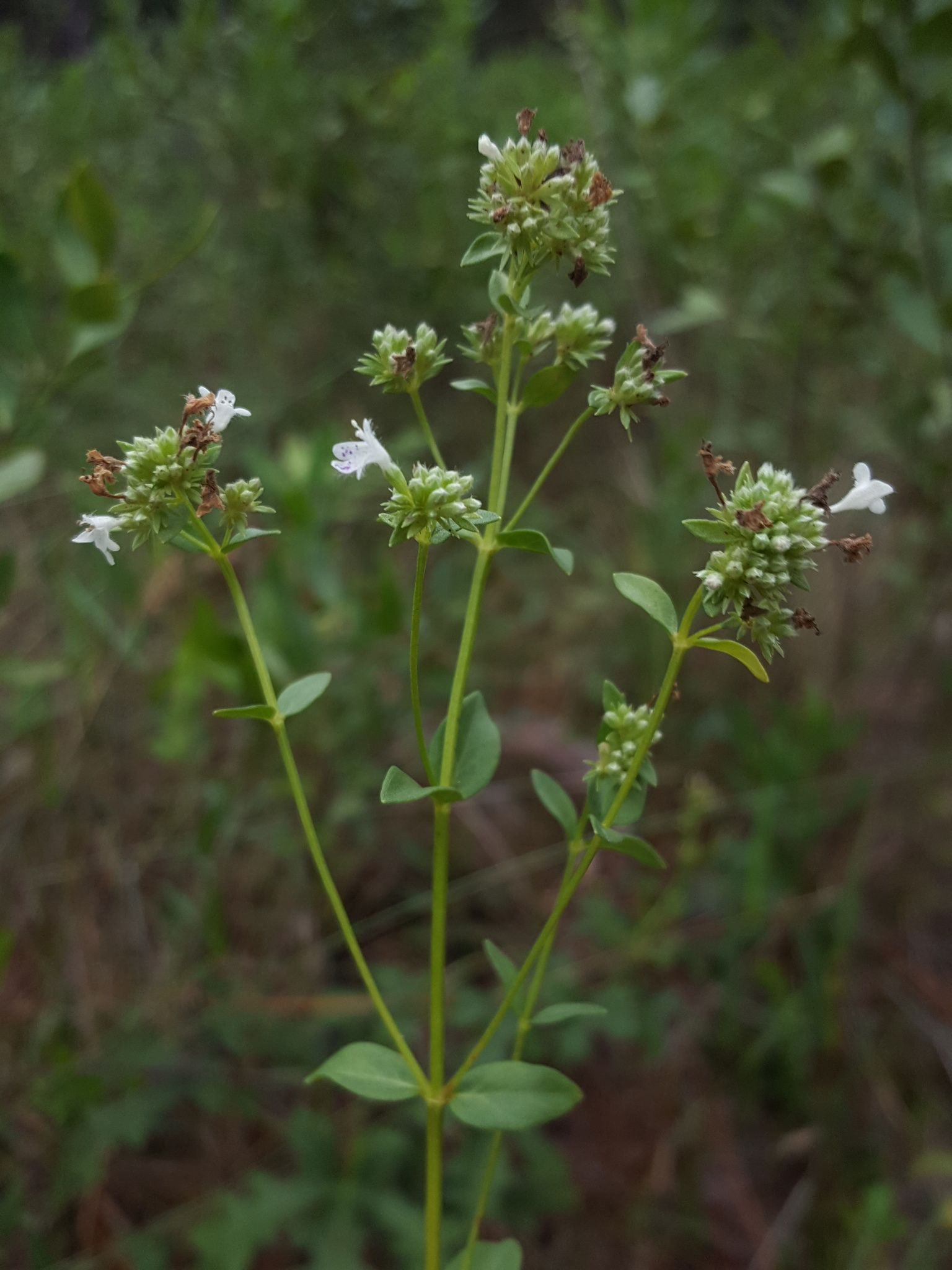

Scientific classification
- Kingdom: Plantae
- Clade: Tracheophytes
- Clade: Angiosperms
- Clade: Eudicots
- Clade: Asterids
- Order: Lamiales
- Family: Lamiaceae
- Genus: Pycnanthemum
- Species: P. nudum

Binomial name
- Pycnanthemum nudum Nutt.

= Pycnanthemum nudum =

Species of flowering plant

Pycnanthemum nudum is a species of flowering plant in the mint family known by the common names Coastal Plain mountainmint and smooth mountain-mint. It is endemic to the Southeastern United States and has a limited range across Alabama, Florida, Georgia, and South Carolina. Along with P. californicum, P. nudum presents no transitional morphology when compared to the rest of Pycnanthemum. This lack of transitional forms is noteworthy in a genus with such widespread reticulation.
