= Pycnanthemum torreyi =

Scientific classification
- Kingdom: Plantae
- Clade: Tracheophytes
- Clade: Angiosperms
- Clade: Eudicots
- Clade: Asterids
- Order: Lamiales
- Family: Lamiaceae
- Genus: Pycnanthemum
- Species: P. torreyi

Binomial name
- Pycnanthemum torreyi Benth.

Species of flowering plant

Pycnanthemum torreyi, common name Torrey's mountainmint, is a perennial plant native to the United States.

== Conservation status in the United States ==
It is listed as endangered in Connecticut, Illinois, Maryland, New Hampshire, New Jersey, New York (state) and Pennsylvania. It is listed as a special concern in Tennessee.
