= Pycnanthemum monotrichum =

Scientific classification
- Kingdom: Plantae
- Clade: Tracheophytes
- Clade: Angiosperms
- Clade: Eudicots
- Clade: Asterids
- Order: Lamiales
- Family: Lamiaceae
- Genus: Pycnanthemum
- Species: P. monotrichum

Binomial name
- Pycnanthemum monotrichum Fernald

Species of flowering plant

Pycnanthemum monotrichum, commonly known as one-hair mountain-mint, is an extinct species of herbaceous perennial plant in the family Lamiaceae endemic to Southeastern Virginia. Pycnanthemum monotrichum inhabited dry, sandy woodlands and clearings in Virginia's coastal plain. It is a poorly known taxon and may represent a hybrid, or a more abundant species that has been overlooked. Pycnanthemum monotrichum bloomed from July through September and grew up to four feet tall.
