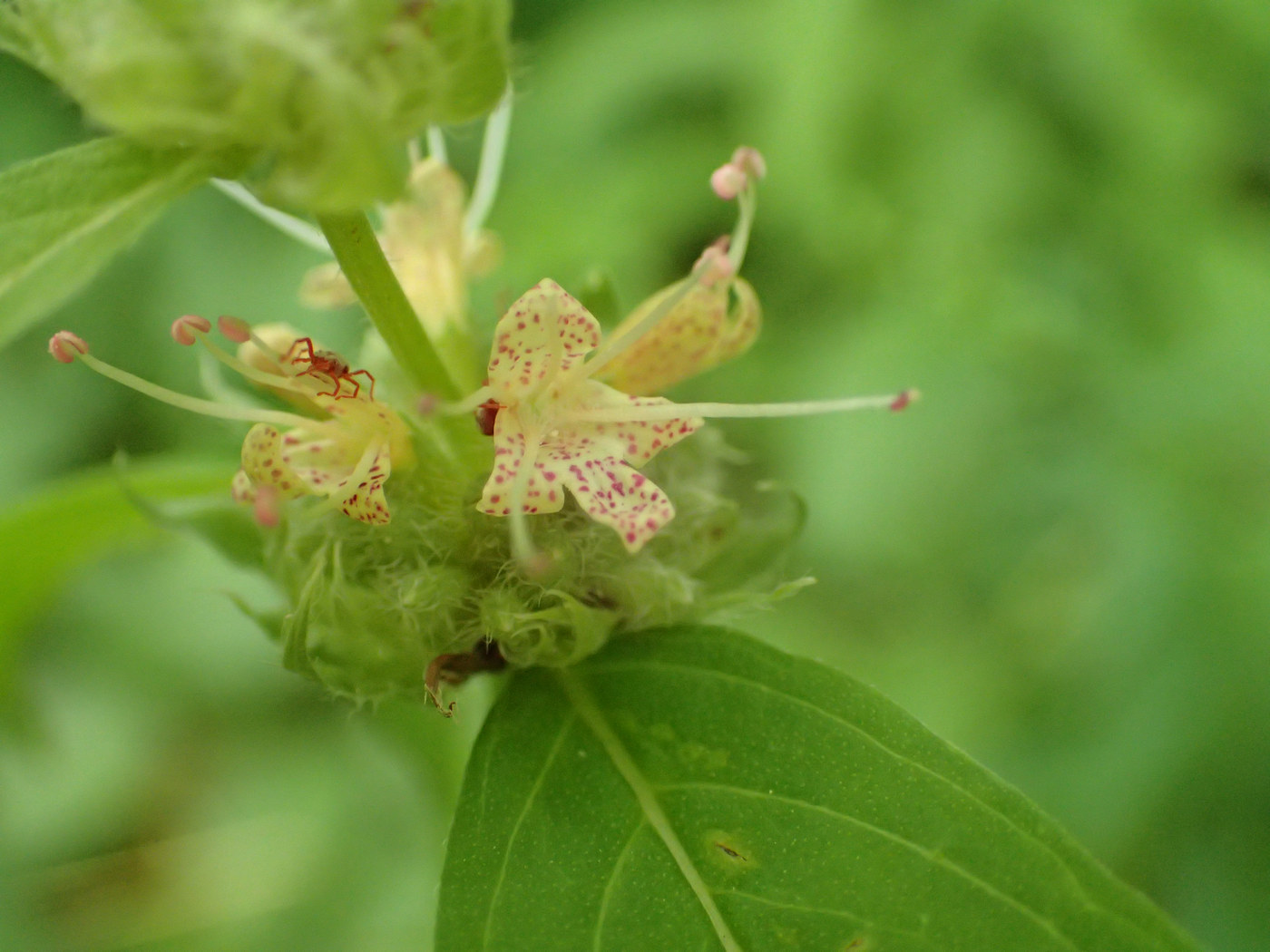

Scientific classification
- Kingdom: Plantae
- Clade: Tracheophytes
- Clade: Angiosperms
- Clade: Eudicots
- Clade: Asterids
- Order: Lamiales
- Family: Lamiaceae
- Genus: Pycnanthemum
- Species: P. montanum

Binomial name
- Pycnanthemum montanum Michx.

= Pycnanthemum montanum =

Species of flowering plant

Pycnanthemum montanum, commonly known as Appalachian mountain-mint, is a species of flowering plant in the mint family (Lamiaceae). It is an aromatic perennial herb native to the United States, where it is found in the Southern Appalachian region.

== Description ==
Pycnanthemum montanum is a perennial herbaceous plant with broad, lanceolate leaves and floral bracts that lack the hoary surface that related members of the genus often have. The calyx lobes and at least the upper part of the calyx tube bear long, spreading hairs that are independent of any apical tuft of bristles.

== Distribution and habitat ==
Pycnanthemum montanum is endemic to the Southern Appalachian region of the United States. Within that area it has been documented from western North Carolina and eastern Tennessee southward into northwestern South Carolina and northern Georgia, where it occupies habitats such as bald summits, soil islands on granitic domes, calcareous woodlands, forests, and forest edges.

== Phenology ==
According to the Flora of the Southeastern United States, plants have been observed to flower from June through August and produce fruit from September through October. User-submitted observations on iNaturalist indicate a similar flowering period, with records showing a wider fruiting period from August through October.
