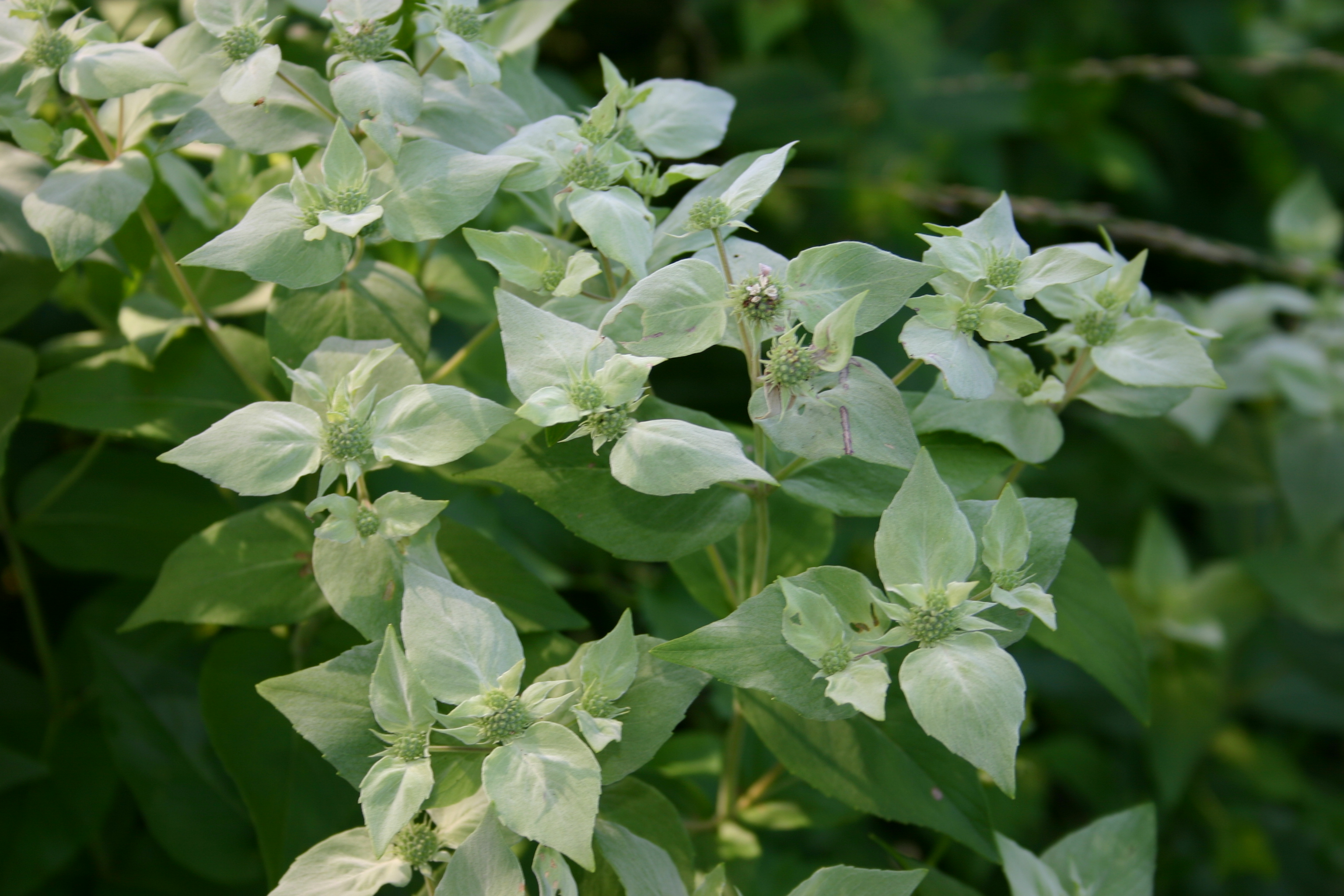
- Short-toothed mountain mint (Pycnanthemum muticum)

Scientific classification
- Kingdom: Plantae
- Clade: Tracheophytes
- Clade: Angiosperms
- Clade: Eudicots
- Clade: Asterids
- Order: Lamiales
- Family: Lamiaceae
- Subfamily: Nepetoideae
- Tribe: Mentheae
- Genus: Pycnanthemum; Michx.

Synonyms
- Furera Adans.; Brachystemum Michx.; Koellia Moench; Tullia Leavenw.; Pycnanthes Raf.

= Pycnanthemum =

Mountain mints

Genus of flowering plants

Pycnanthemum is a genus of herbaceous plants in the mint family (Lamiaceae). Species in this genus are often referred to as mountain mints and they often have a minty or thyme-like aroma when crushed. All species of Pycnanthemum are native to the United States and Canada. The center of diversity for the genus is North Carolina with 13 of the 20 species having been collected therein. Nineteen of the 20 species of Pycnanthemum occur in the Eastern US and Canada, and one disjunct species (P. californicum) occurs in California and Oregon.

Pycnanthemum is derived from Greek. The Greek word "pyknos" has the meaning of "dense", "tight", or "close-packed". It was combined with "anthos" meaning flower to give the genus name.

Pycnanthemum belongs to the true mint subtribe (Menthinae), and it has been shown to be closely related to the Monarda, Blephilia, and the scrub mints of the Southeastern United States. Relationships within the genus remain unresolved. A complicated history of polyploidization paired with cryptic morphologies makes this a challenging group for systematists.

== Species ==
- Pycnanthemum albescens Torr. & A.Gray – white-leaved mountainmint – south-central US
- Pycnanthemum beadlei (Small) Fernald – North Carolina, South Carolina, Virginia, eastern Tennessee, northern Georgia
- Pycnanthemum californicum Torr. ex Durand – Sierra mint – California
- Pycnanthemum clinopodioides Torr. & A.Gray – mid-Atlantic States, Tennessee, Indiana
- Pycnanthemum curvipes (Greene) E.Grant & Epling – southeastern US
- Pycnanthemum flexuosum (Walter) Britton, Sterns & Poggenb. – southeastern US
- Pycnanthemum floridanum E.Grant & Epling – Florida mountainmint – Florida, southern Georgia
- Pycnanthemum incanum (L.) Michx. – hoary mountainmint, hoary basil, wild basil – Ontario, most of US east of the Mississippi River
- Pycnanthemum loomisii Nutt. – Loomis' mountainmint – southeastern US, Ohio Valley
- †Pycnanthemum monotrichum Fernald – Virginia but extinct
- Pycnanthemum montanum Michx. – southern Appalachians
- Pycnanthemum muticum (Michx.) Pers. – short-toothed mountainmint – much of eastern US from east Texas to southern Maine
- Pycnanthemum nudum Nutt. – Coastal Plain mountainmint – southeastern US
- Pycnanthemum pilosum Nutt. ( = P. verticillatum var. pilosum) – hairy mountainmint, whorled mountainmint
- Pycnanthemum pycnanthemoides (Leavenw.) Fernald – southern mountainmint – southeastern US, Ohio Valley
- Pycnanthemum setosum Nutt. – awned mountainmint – southeastern + mid-Atlantic US
- Pycnanthemum tenuifolium Schrad. – little-leaved mountainmint, slender-leaved mountainmint (= P. flexuosum auct. non Walter) – Quebec, Ontario, eastern + central US
- Pycnanthemum torreyi Benth. – Torrey's mountainmint – eastern + east-central US
- Pycnanthemum verticillatum (Michx.) Pers. – whorled mountainmint – Quebec, Ontario, eastern + central US
- Pycnanthemum virginianum (L.) T.Durand & B.D.Jacks. ex B.L.Rob. – Virginia mountainmint – Quebec, Ontario, eastern + central US
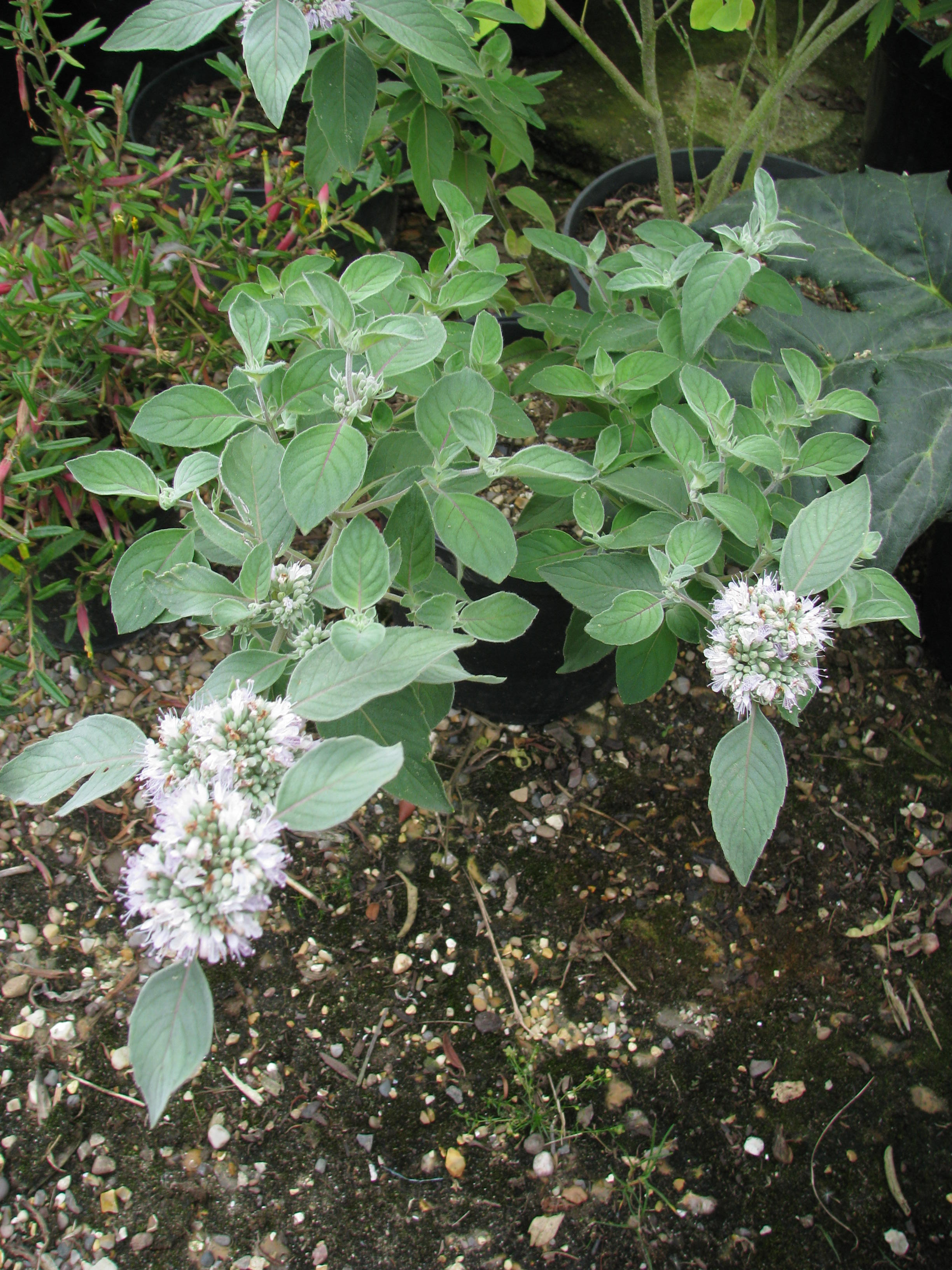
Pycnanthemum curvipes

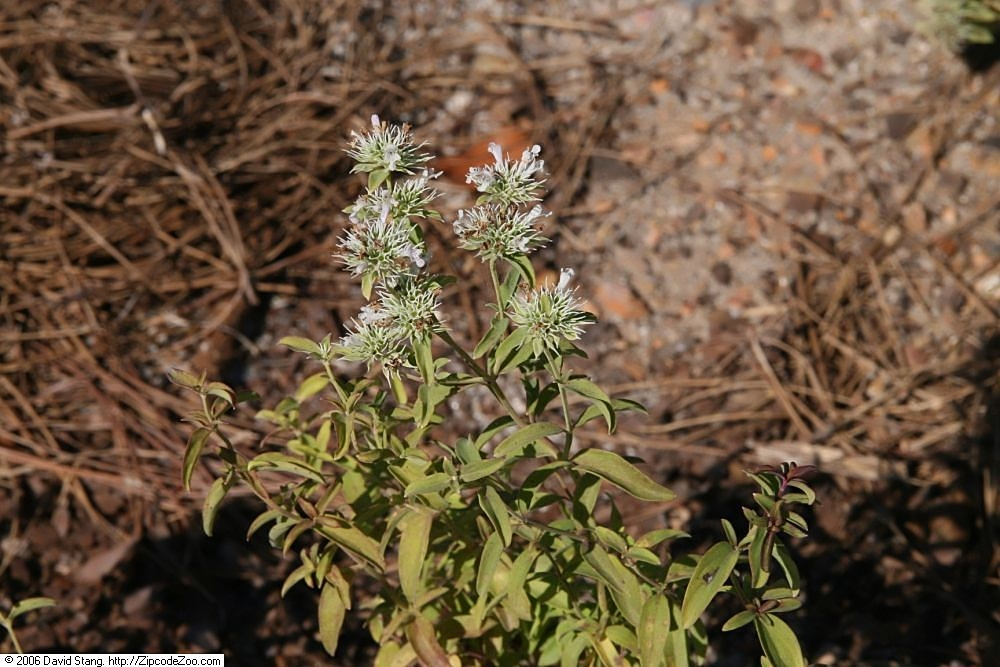
Pycnanthemum flexuosum

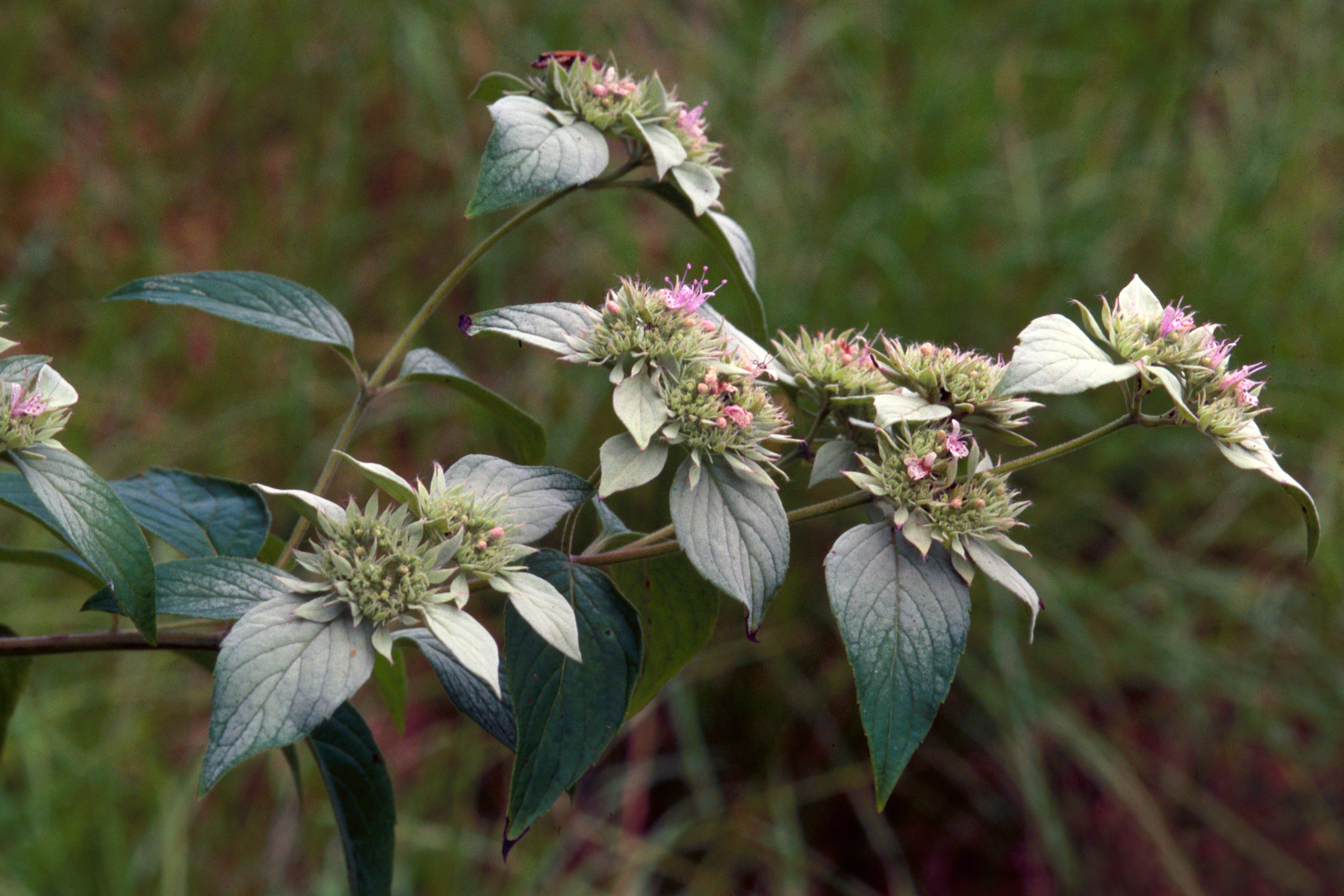
Pycnanthemum incanum

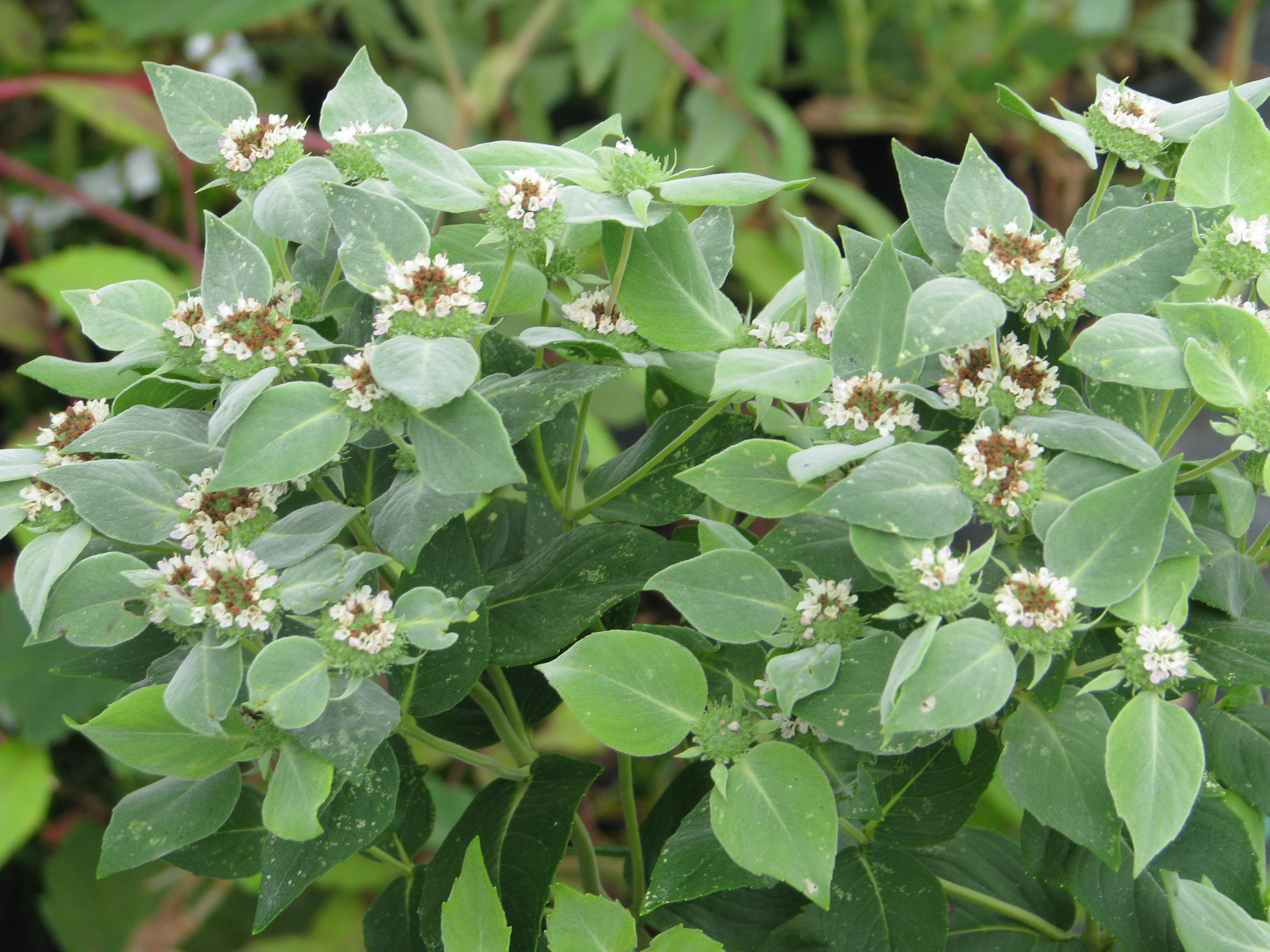
Pycnanthemum muticum

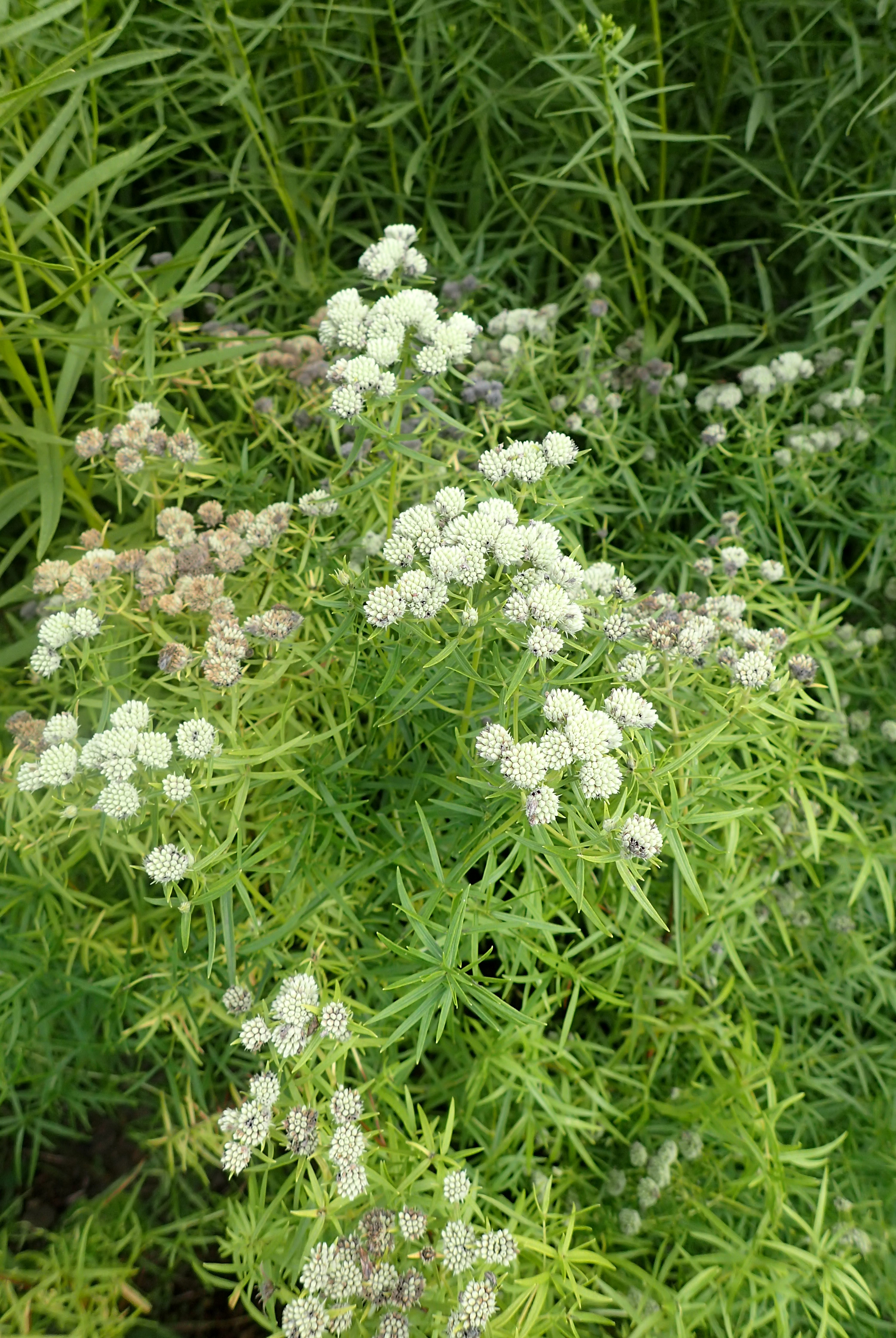
Pycnanthemum tenuifolium with ripening seed

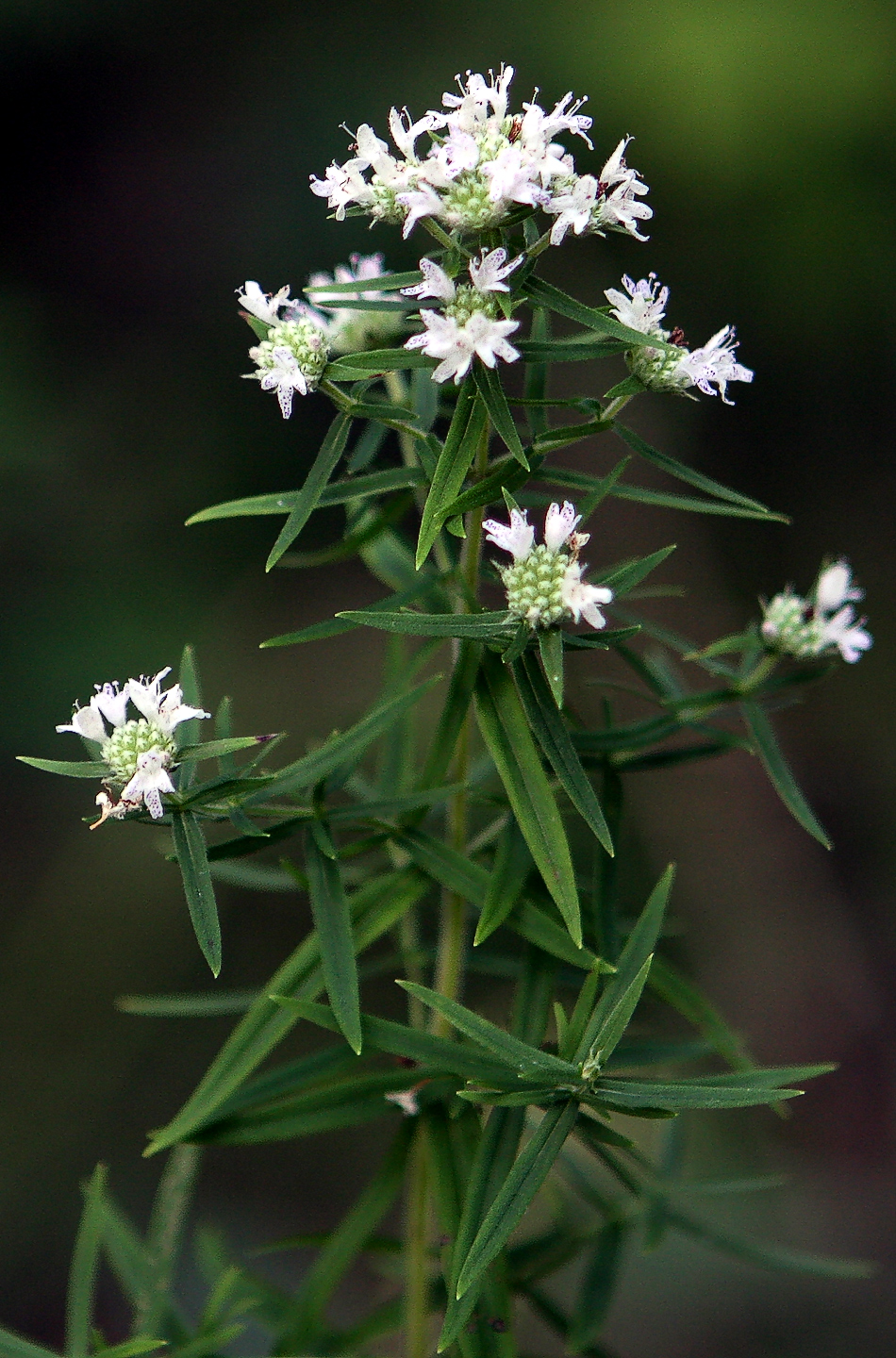
Pycnanthemum virginianum

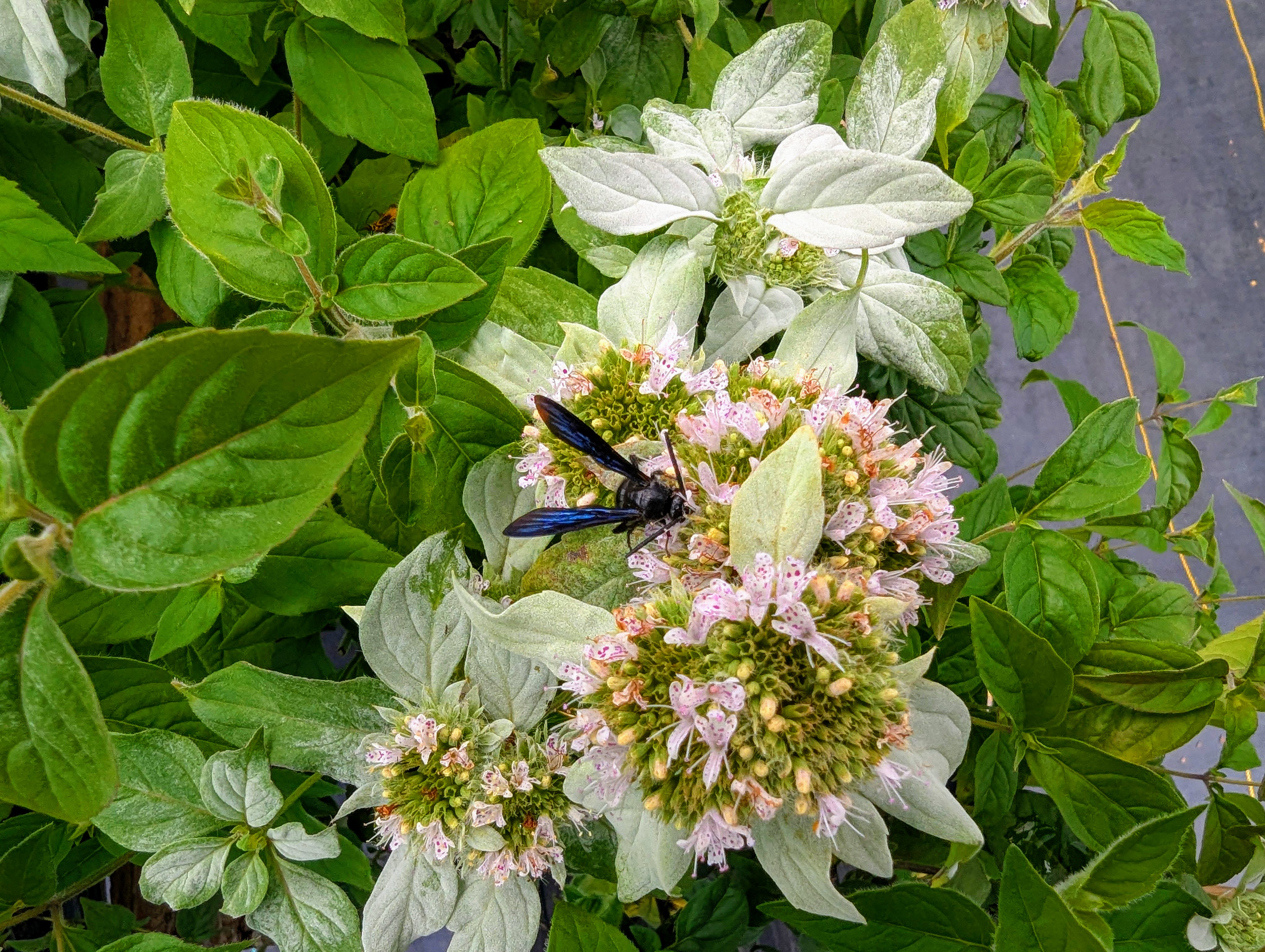
A wasp on blooming Mountain Mint (Pycnanthemum)
