= Hitchcock Nature Center =

Nature preserve in Iowa, United States

Coordinates: 41°24′50″N 95°51′50″W

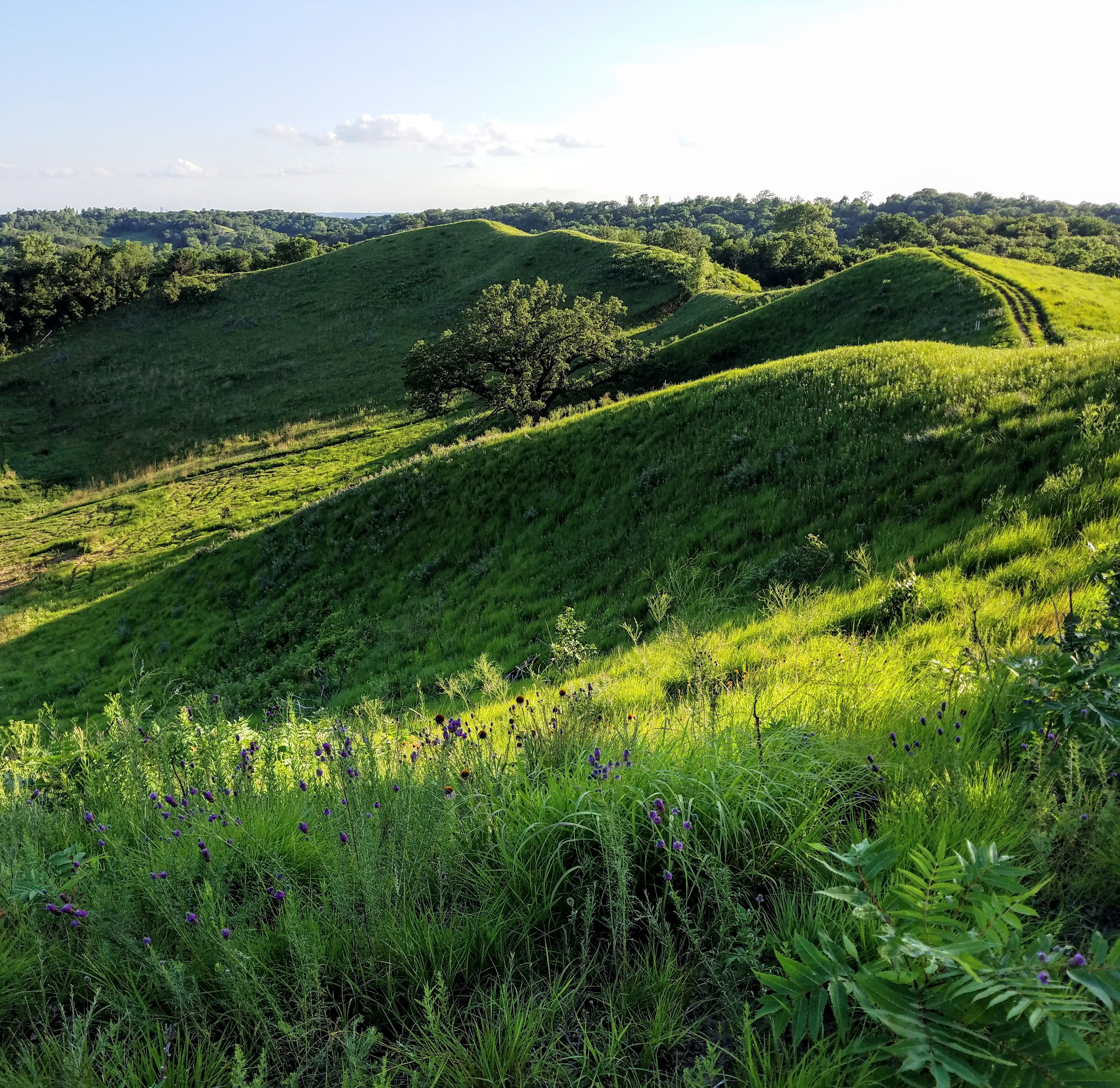
Prairie preserve located in Hitchcock Nature Center

Hitchcock Nature Center (Often referred to as HNC or Hitchcock) is a nature preserve located in Honey Creek, Pottawattamie County, Iowa, and maintained by the Pottawattamie County Conservation Board.

== History ==
Originally started as a YMCA camp, it was eventually purchased by the Pottawattamie County Conservation Board (PCCB). In 1992, Hitchcock Hawkwatch Association (HHA), a volunteer organization of bird and hawk watchers partnered with the PCCB to form the bi-annual Hitchcock Nature Center HawkWatch. Hitchcock is one of the few remaining hawkwatches in the Great Plains.

== Geography ==
Hitchcock nature center is a 1,268-acre (513 ha) preserve located near the center of Iowa's Loess Hills and near the Missouri River Valley. This geographical formation is the result of receding glaciers depositing soil during the end of the last Ice Age. The preserve is now designated as a mix of prairie, forest, and Bur Oak Savanna. It is estimated that nearly 100 separate species of birds nest here annually.
