= Stephens State Forest =

State forest in Iowa, United States

- Location within Iowa Location within the United States
- Coordinates: 41°00′48″N 93°28′51″W
- Area: 15,500 acres (6,300 ha)
- Established: 1930s
- Named for: T. C. Stephens
- Administrator: Iowa Department of Natural Resources
- Website: Official website

Stephens State Forest is a state forest located in Lucas, Clarke, Monroe, Appanoose and Davis counties in Iowa. Stephens State Forest is 15,500 acres and split into 7 separate locations (referred to as Units) that collectively make up the largest state forest in Iowa.

== History ==
Stephen's State Forest was established in the 1930s by the Civilian Conservation Corp (CCC) through an effort to expand hardwood and conifer populations in the area. In the 1950s, the CCC sold the land to the state of Iowa and the forest was converted into a recreational property. The 7 separate parcels of land that make up Stephens State Forest are referred to as the Lucas, Whitebreast, Woodburn, Cedar Creek, Chariton, Thousand Acres, and Unionville Units.

In 1951, the state forest was named after T. C. Stephens, a professor of biology at Morningside College, ornithologist, and conservationist. Prior to this, the collective units of land were referred to as the Lucas-Monroe Forest Area.

In 2008, Stephens State Forest was designated as a Bird Conservation Area (BCA) and the Thousand Acres BCA was designated in 2014.

== Ecology ==
Stephens State Forest consists of tallgrass prairie association, upland hardwood association, bottomland hardwood association, and their respective transition zones. Due to the CCC planting non-native trees in the 1930s. the soil is predominantly made up of forest vegetation.

=== Flora ===
- Tallgrass prairie:
  - Andropogon gerardi (Big bluestem)
  - Panicum virgatum (Switch grass)
  - Sorghastrum nutans (Indian grass)
  - Spartina pectinata (Prairie cordgrass)
  - Echinacea purpurea (Purple coneflower)
  - Lespedeza capitata (Round headed bush clover)
  - Amorpha canescens (Lead plant)
  - Pycnanthemum incanum (Mountain mint)
- Hardwood trees:
  - Quercus alba (White oak)
  - Quercus rubra (Red oak)
  - Quercus velutina (Black oak)
  - Quercus macrocarpa (Bur oak)
  - Quercus imbricaria (Shingle oak)
  - Ulmus rubra (Red elm)
  - Ulmus laevis (White elm)
  - Populus sect. Aigeiros (Cottonwood)
  - Celtis (Hackberry)
  - Fraxinus (Ash)
  - Acer saccharinum (Silver maple)
  - Juglans nigra (Black walnut)
- Coniferous and non-native hardwoods:
  - Picea (Spruce)
  - Robinia pseudoacacia (Black locust)
  - Liriodendron tulipifera (Tulip poplar)
