= Loess Hills =

Hills of the United States

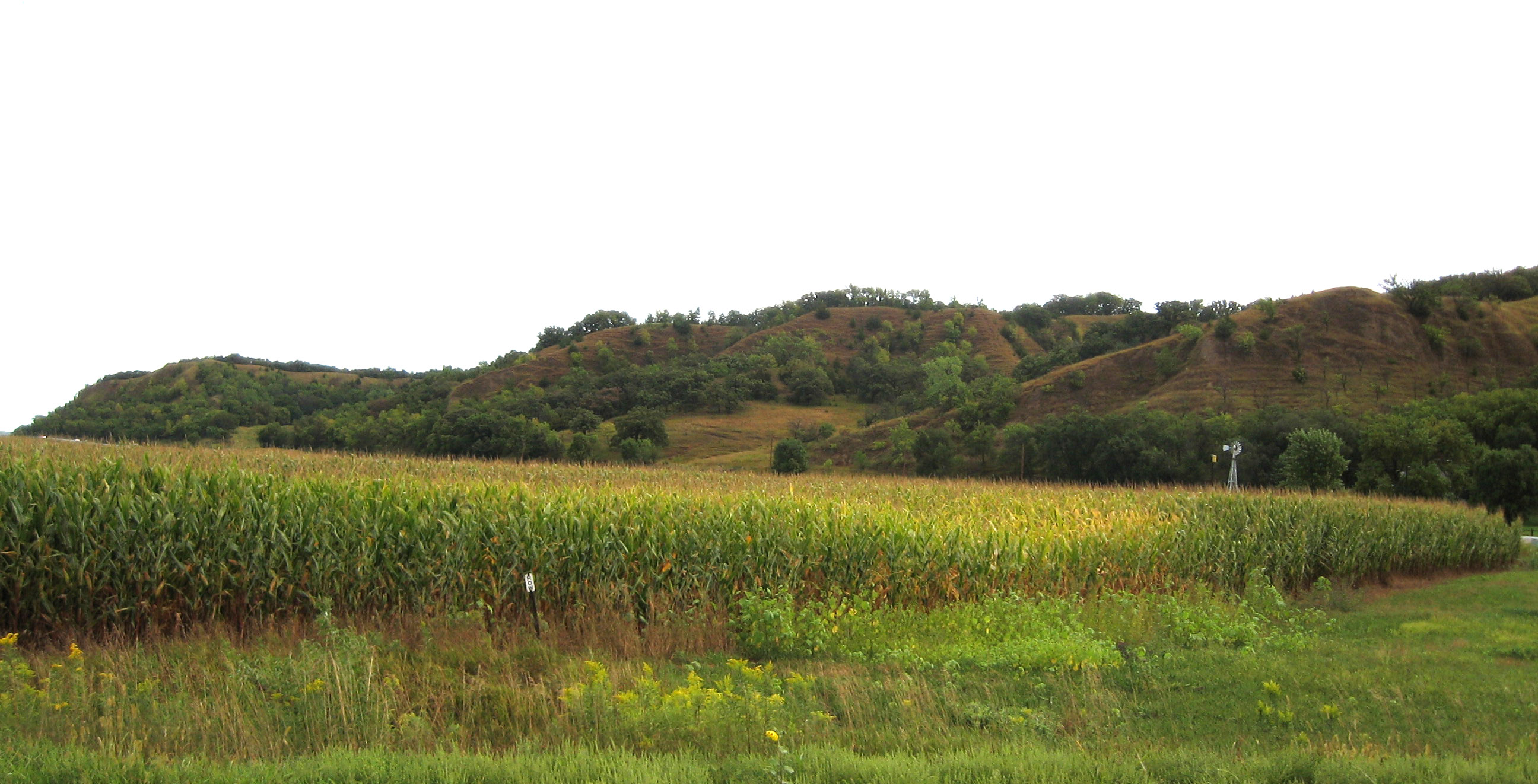
- Loess Hills east of Mondamin, Iowa.
- Interactive map of Loess Hills
- Location: Western Iowa and Missouri, Eastern Nebraska and Kansas, U.S.
- Coordinates: 41°48′05″N 95°59′42″W
- Designated: 1986

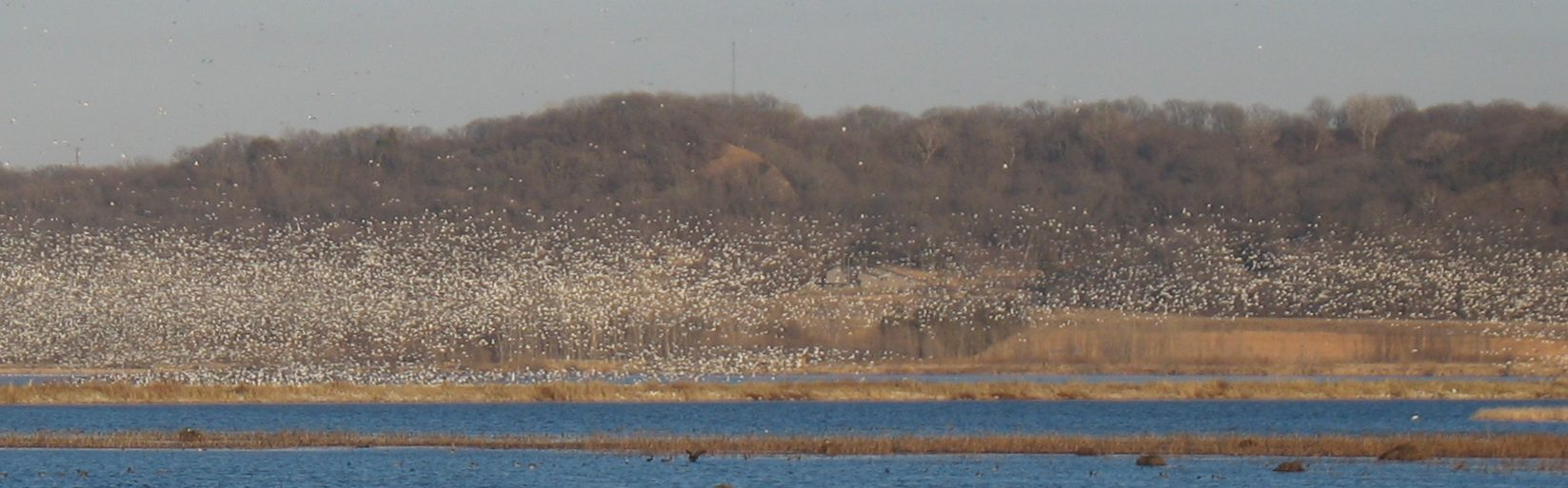
Snow geese flying in front of the Loess Hills at Loess Bluffs National Wildlife Refuge in the Missouri River bottoms near Mound City, Missouri

The Loess Hills are a formation of wind-deposited loess soil in the westernmost parts of Iowa and Missouri, and the easternmost parts of Nebraska and Kansas, along the Missouri River.

== Geology ==
The Loess (/ˈloʊ.əs/, /ˈlʌs/, or /ˈlɛs/) Hills are generally located between 1 and 15 miles (2 and 24 km) east of the Missouri River channel. The Loess Hills rise 200 feet (60 m) above the flat plains forming a narrow band running north–south 200 miles (320 km) along the Missouri River. These hills are the first rise in land beyond the floodplain, forming something of a "front range" for Iowa, and parts of Missouri and Nebraska adjacent to the Missouri River. The Loess land formations of Iowa extend north into South Dakota and are a feature of three state Parks in South Eastern South Dakota: Union Grove State Park, Newton Hills State Park and Blood Run State Park.

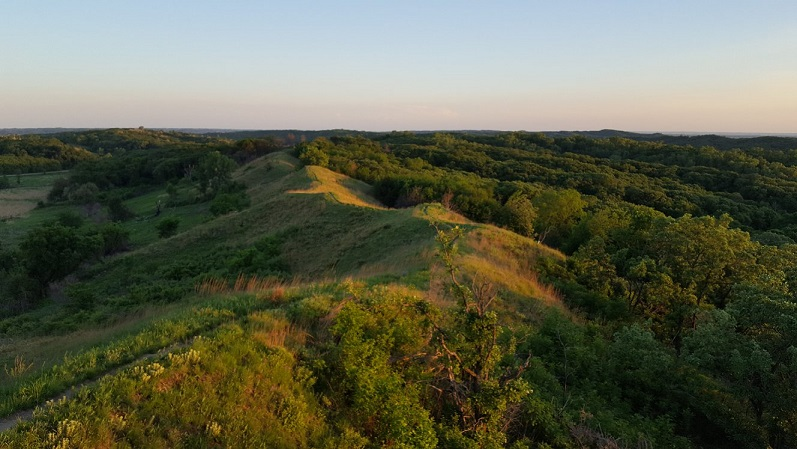
A view of the thin ridges that form the "spine" of the Loess Hills

During the last Ice Age, glaciers advanced into the middle of North America, grinding underlying rock into dust-like "glacial flour." As temperatures warmed, the glaciers retreated and vast amounts of meltwater and sediment flooded the Missouri River Valley. The sediment was deposited on the flood plain, creating huge mud flats. When meltwaters receded, these mud flats were exposed. As they dried, the fine-grained silt was picked up by strong prevailing westerly winds. Huge dust clouds were moved and redeposited over broad areas. The heavier, coarser silt was deposited close to the Missouri River flood plain, forming vast dune fields. The dune fields were eventually stabilized by grass. Due to the erosive nature of loess soil and its ability to stand in vertical columns when dry, the stabilized dunes were eroded into the corrugated, sharply dissected bluffs we see today.

The dominant features of this landscape are "peak and saddle" topography, "razor ridges" (narrow ridges, often less than 10 feet (3 m) wide, which fall off at near ninety-degree angles on either side for 60 feet (18 m) or more), and "cat-step" terraces (caused by the constant slumping and vertical shearing of the loess soil). The soil has a characteristic yellow hue and is generally broken down into several units based on the period of deposition (Loveland, Pisgah, Peoria). Loess is known locally as "sugar clay" because it can be extremely hard when dry, but when wet, loses all cohesion. The Loess Hills of Iowa are remarkable for the depth of the drift layer, often more than 90 feet (27 m) deep. The only comparable deposits of loess to such an extent are located in Shaanxi, China.

== Geography ==
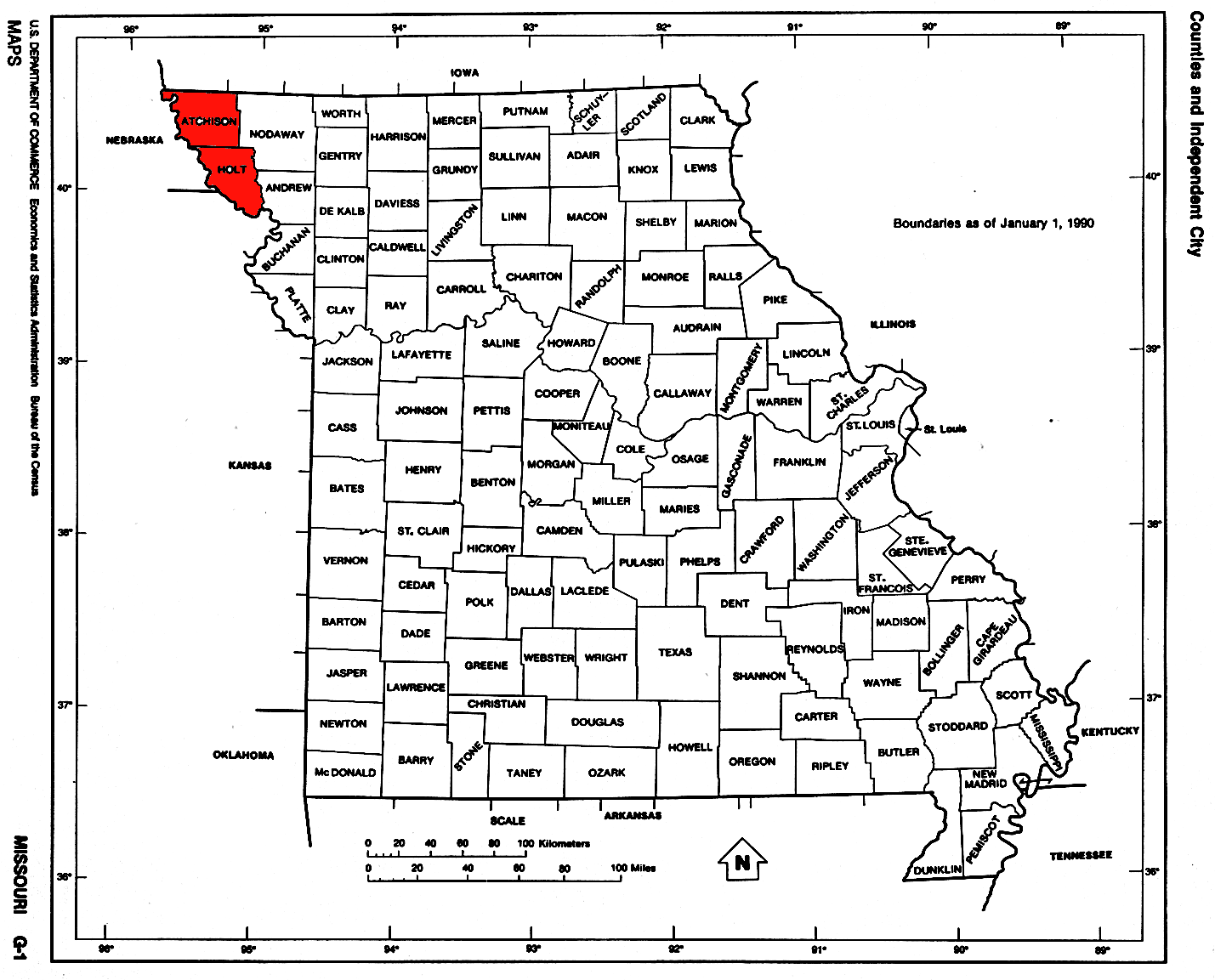
The Loess Hills region in Missouri

Today, the hills stretch from the Blood Run Site in South Dakota in the north to Mound City, Missouri in the south. Loess topography can be found at various points in extreme eastern portions of Nebraska and Kansas along the Missouri River valley, particularly near the Nebraska cities of Brownville, Rulo, Plattsmouth, Fort Calhoun, and Ponca, and the Iowa cities of Hamburg and Sidney. Southeastern South Dakota has three state parks that feature the loess formations: Union Grove State Park, Newton Hills State Park and Blood Run State Park, all of which are south of Sioux Falls. The Big Sioux River separates the South Dakota Loess Hills from the Iowa Loess Hills; in South Dakota, the Loess Hills follow the eastern edge of Brule Creek. The hills are usually no more than 200 feet (61 m) above the Missouri River bottoms. However, in some areas, such as Murray Hill in Harrison County, Iowa, the Loess Hills can rise over 350 feet (110 m) above the adjacent Missouri River floodplain.

== Biology ==
The Loess Hills have abundant oak-hickory hardwood forests and some of the last remaining stands of prairie grass in the region. The invasion of prairie and oak savanna areas by woodland species such as red cedar (not native to the Hills) is threatening the stability of the fragile soils, as well as diminishing the native ecosystems found there. The areas of native prairie comprise big bluestem and little bluestem, Indian grass, sideoats grama, and forbs such as yucca, pasque flower (the South Dakota state flower) and lead plant (false indigo). Many of the prairie species found in the Loess Hills are outside of their normal range of distribution, with plants like spiny-leafed yucca and prickly pear cactus being more common further west, in the Sandhills of central Nebraska. In 1984, a previously undiscovered fern, the Prairie Moonwort, was discovered in the Hills and is thought to be endemic to the Hills.

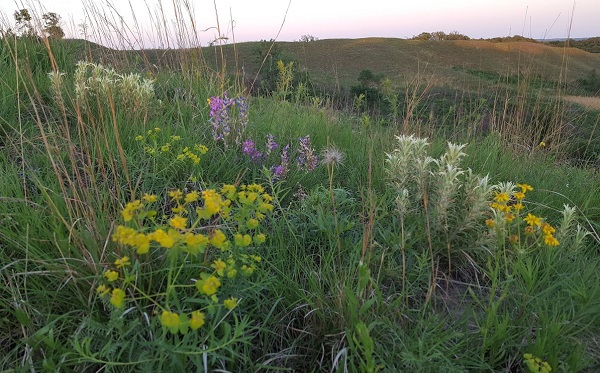
Wildflowers in the Loess Hills

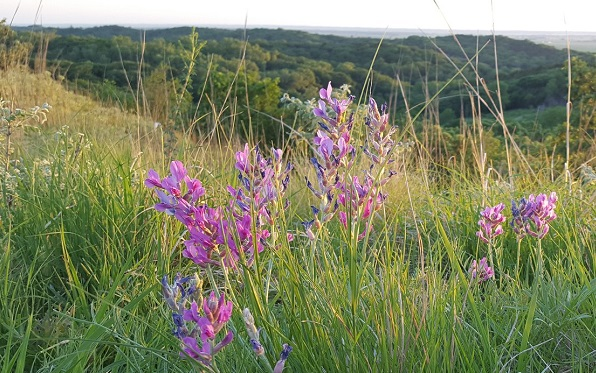
Larkspur in Loess Hills

Common fauna of the modern Loess Hills include white-tail deer, coyote, wild turkey, badger, bobcat, red and gray fox, ringneck pheasant, bobwhite, and red-tailed hawk, some of which were introduced or encouraged by Euro-American settlers. Woodland species are also on the rise in the Loess Hills as the suppression of fire has led to an increase in habitat for forest-dwelling species. Fauna more typical of the pre-settlement Loess Hills, such as the prairie rattlesnake, great plains skink, plains pocket mouse, ornate box turtle and spadefoot toad, are becoming rare and even endangered due to habitat fragmentation as a result of increased development and suppression of fire in prairie remnants and oak savannas. Species such as bobcat have been rebounding, and mountain lions have been recorded in Southwest Iowa in the last decade. Historically, fauna also included American bison, prairie chicken, mule deer, elk, and gray wolf; these were extirpated by the late nineteenth century.

The Missouri River valley had historically been a major migration corridor for birds, however, the channelization of the river and destruction of wetlands has led to a marked decline. The corridor still boasts one of the best areas to view raptor migrations on the continent. As air masses move off the Great Plains, they sink into the Missouri River valley. The prevailing winds across the floodplain then hit the sharp rise of the Loess Hills, creating thermal updrafts that raptors use to make their way to and from breeding grounds. Raptors can often be viewed forming "kettles", where many birds will create a funnel-like formation as they utilize the same thermal. Typical species found during the months from September to December include red-tailed hawk, sharp-shinned hawk, peregrine falcon, ferruginous hawk, Swainson's hawk, Cooper's hawk, osprey, northern harrier, American kestrel, and bald eagle. In all, 20 species of raptor have been identified in a single season since the Hitchcock Nature Center HawkWatch started, with a record count of 16,000 birds in one season in 2005.

Broken Kettle Grasslands Preserve in the northern Loess Hills is home to Iowa's only population of nesting black-billed magpies and home to the last remaining known population of prairie rattlesnake in Iowa.

== Recreation and public lands ==
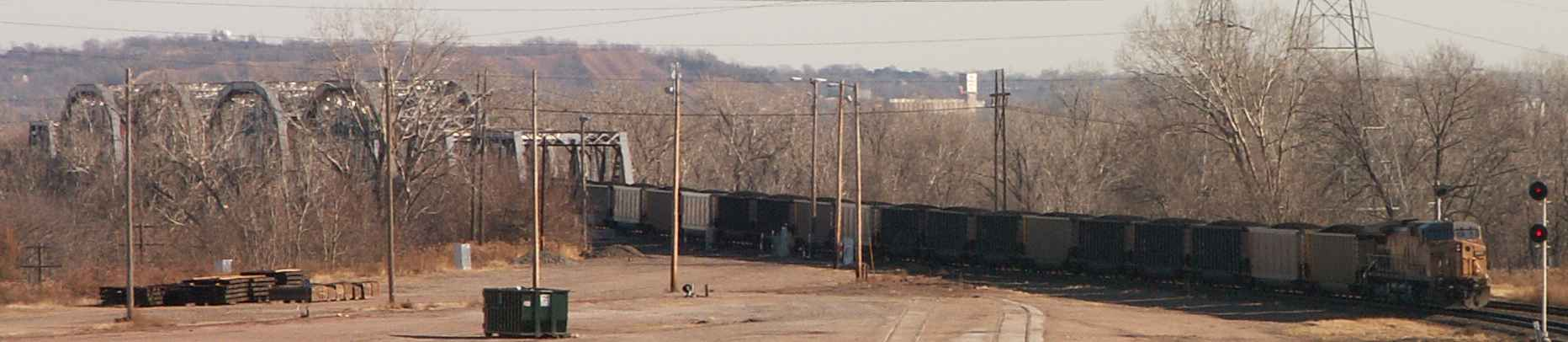
Union Pacific coal train crossing the Union Pacific Missouri River Bridge in Omaha with the Loess Hills in the background.

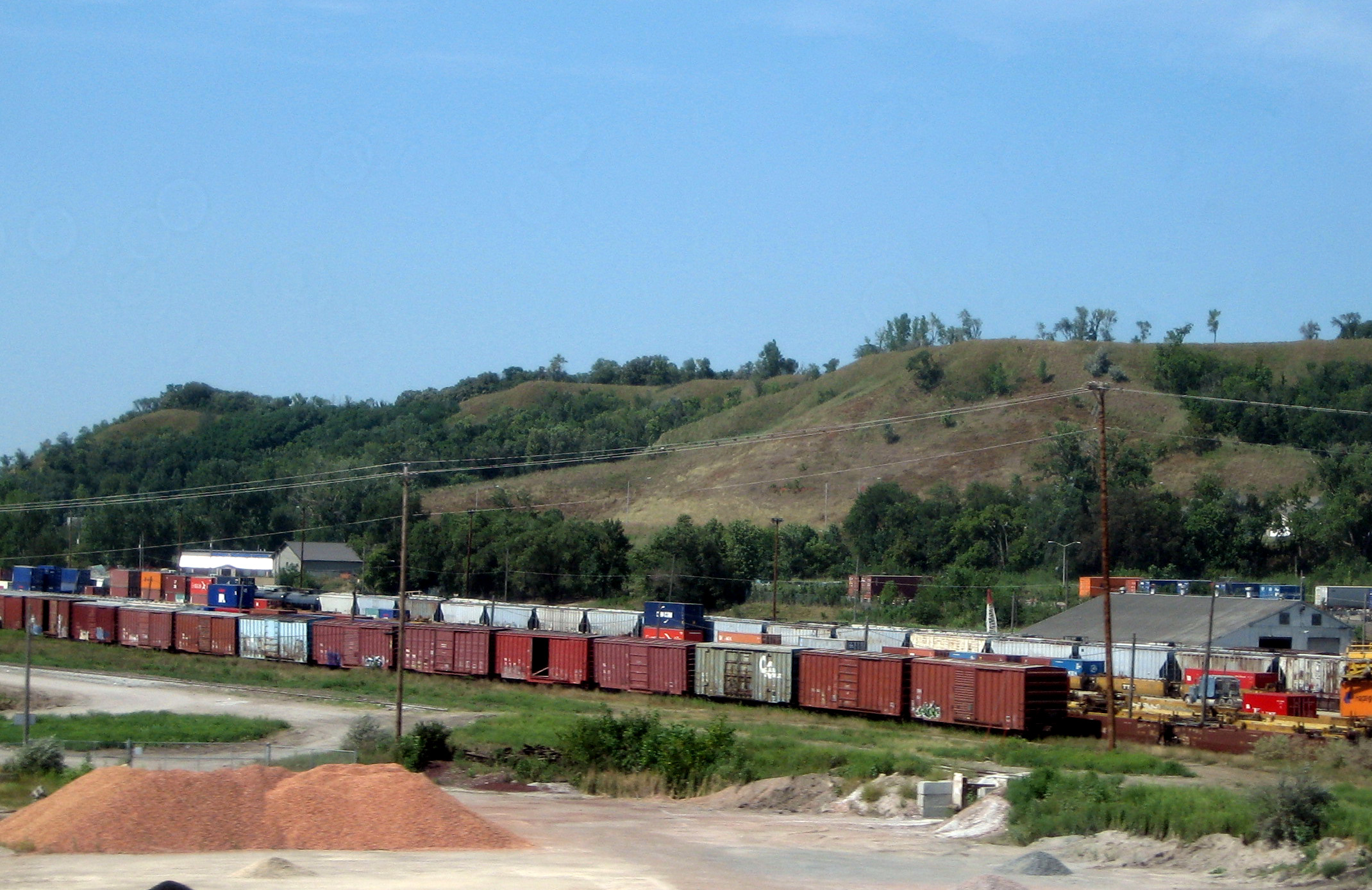
Loess Hills forming the valley wall of the Missouri River Valley in Council Bluffs, Iowa

The Loess Hills Scenic Byway affords many scenic views from Westfield, Iowa, and to Hamburg. While much of the landscape is held in private ownership, thousands of acres of public land exist in state and county parks, wildlife areas and preserves. The Nature Conservancy also owns several preserve areas in the Hills which are open to the public, including Broken Kettle Grasslands Preserve—the largest contiguous tract of native prairie left in Iowa. The Loess Hills State Forest is located in west-central Iowa in Harrison and Monona counties. It comprises four units totaling 10,600 acres (43 km^{2}), and offers hiking, backpacking, picnicking, and fishing opportunities. Preparation Canyon State Park, located near Pisgah in Monona County, is a less developed park in the middle of the Loess Hills State Forest. It has 344 acres (1.4 km^{2}) including what was once the Mormon village of Preparation. Backpacking trails lead to hike-in campsites. Two major state parks anchor the north and south end of the range—Waubonsie in the south and Stone in the north, both offer camping and a variety of other amenities. Hitchcock Nature Center is operated by the Pottawattamie County Conservation Board and features a lodge with raptor viewing platform and observation tower, from which one has striking views of the Hills, the Missouri River valley, and the skyline of downtown Omaha, Nebraska. Hike-in camping is also available at this location. Two National Natural Landmarks are located in the Loess Hills. The Little Sioux/Smith Lake Site contains 2,980 acres (12 km^{2}) and is perhaps the best example of the unique topography produced by large deposits of loess soil. The 7,440-acre (30 km^{2}) Turin Site of the Loess Hills National Natural Landmark is located just outside Turin and also contains the Turin Man prehistoric archeological site.

== Human history ==
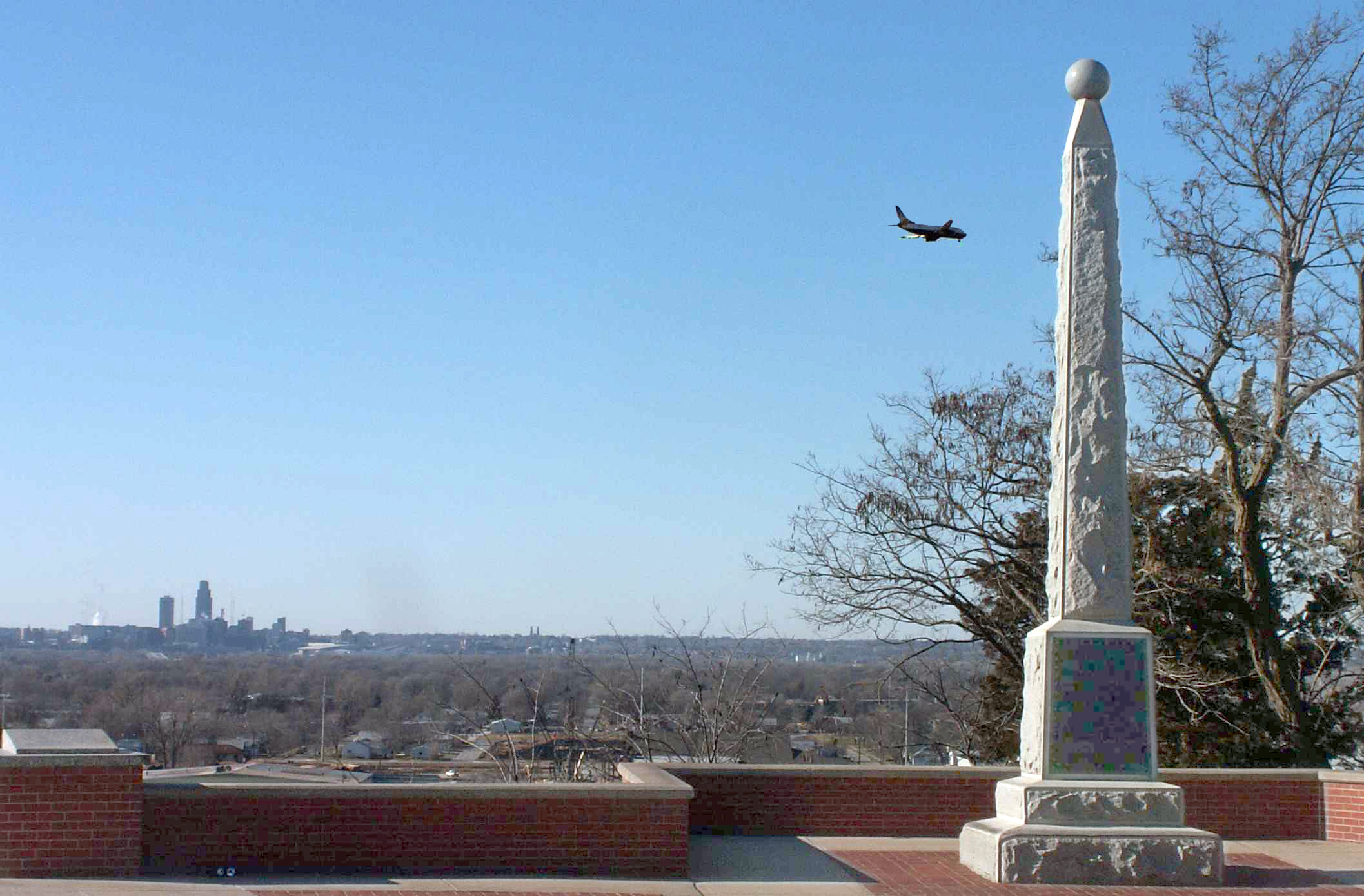
Lincoln Memorial where Abraham Lincoln is said to have selected Council Bluffs as the eastern terminus of the transcontinental railroad.

The Loess Hills have a rich archaeological heritage. The hills around Glenwood, in Mills County, were inhabited by the Glenwood culture, an eastern extension of the Nebraska Phase of the Woodland period. The Glenwood Culture lived in the area from roughly 900 A.D. to 1300 A.D. and built hundreds of earth lodges in the region, farming the rich valley bottoms and cultivating native plants from the surrounding hills. An earth lodge replica has been reconstructed in Glenwood Lake Park, and the Mills County Museum, also located at the park, houses an excellent collection of artifacts collected by renowned amateur archeologist Paul Rowe.

The city of Council Bluffs, Iowa (originally "Kanesville") derives its name from the hills based on the Lewis and Clark first formal "council", or meeting, with Native Americans in 1804, although the meeting with the Oto and Missouri tribe actually took place on the Nebraska side of the Missouri River at Fort Atkinson. Sgt. Charles Floyd, the only fatality of the Lewis and Clark Expedition, is buried on a bluff in the Loess Hills in what is now Sioux City, Iowa.

In 1853, Mormon elder Charles B. Thompson split off from the main wagon train to Utah. He initially led 50 to 60 Mormon families to Kanesville. Thompson and a few other men then chose an area called Monona ("peaceful valley"), where they founded the town of Preparation, named for "School of Preparation for the Life Beyond." Realizing the valley's wealth as a farming region, Thompson used his newspaper to report a message "from a spirit" directing the Mormon people to turn over all deeds and possessions to Thompson, who changed his name to "Father Ephraim". In 1856, the people asked for the return of their property; Thompson refused and they decided to lynch him. Thompson escaped the mob by hiding in an attic in Onawa. He then fled Iowa.

On August 12, 1859, Abraham Lincoln ascended the hills at Cemetery Hill at Fairview Cemetery in Council Bluffs while being briefed on possible locations for the First transcontinental railroad.

== Other loess landscapes ==
Loess soil also forms the Arikaree Breaks in northwest Kansas, and the Mississippi-Yazoo "Bluff Hills" near Vicksburg, Mississippi. A large region of Nebraska to the south and east of the Sandhills is covered with loess. Deep loess deposits are also found in the Rhine River valley in Germany. Crowley's Ridge in southeastern Missouri and northeastern and eastern Arkansas is made up of loess soil. The word loess is derived from the German for "loose or crumbly."

== See also ==
- Loess Plateau
- Yunnan–Guizhou Plateau
- Loess Hills District AVA
