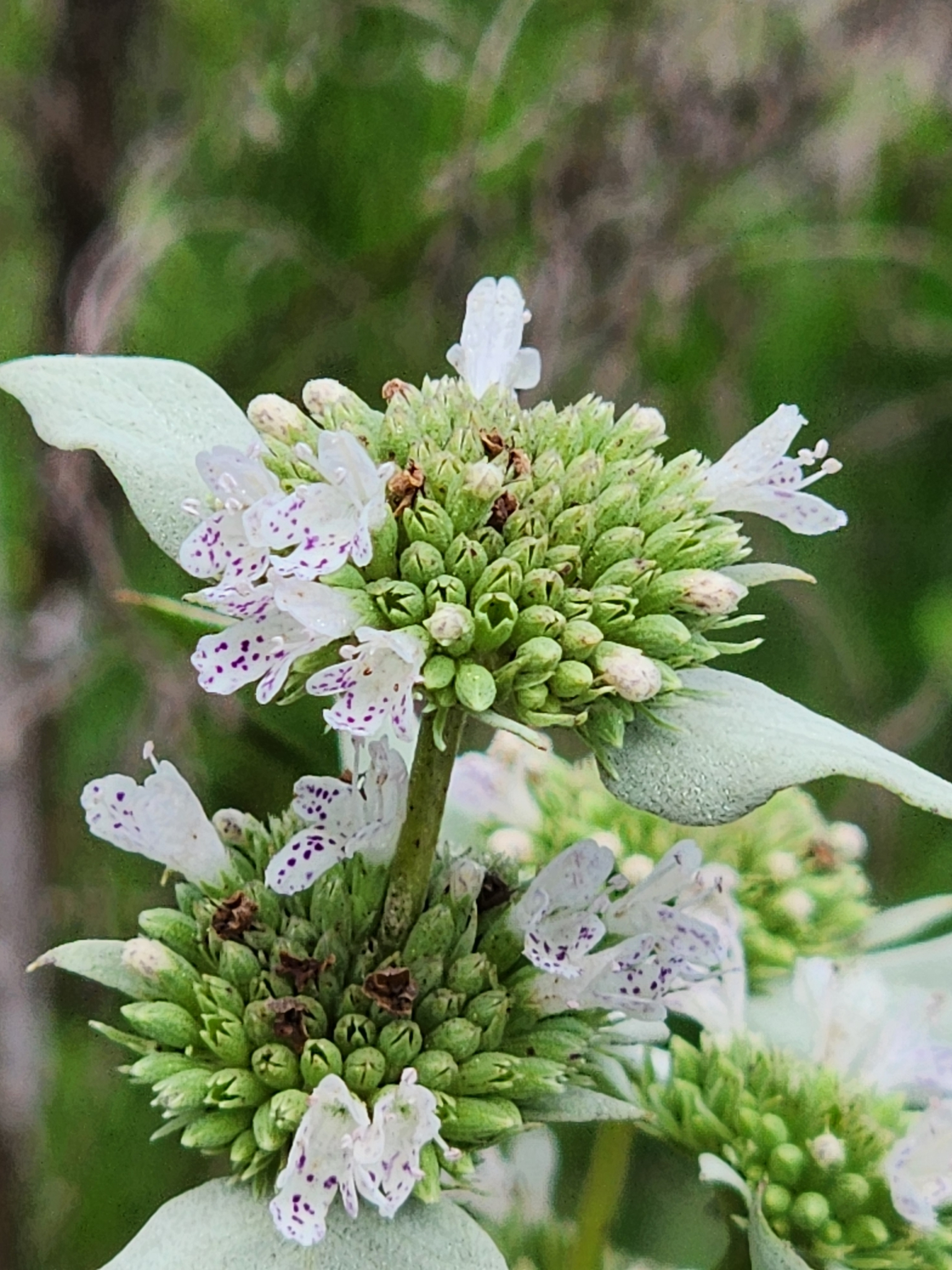
- Blooming in longleaf pine sandhill habitat

Conservation status
- Vulnerable (NatureServe)

Scientific classification
- Kingdom: Plantae
- Clade: Tracheophytes
- Clade: Angiosperms
- Clade: Eudicots
- Clade: Asterids
- Order: Lamiales
- Family: Lamiaceae
- Genus: Pycnanthemum
- Species: P. floridanum

Binomial name
- Pycnanthemum floridanum E.Grant & Epling

= Pycnanthemum floridanum =

Species of plant

Pycnanthemum floridanum, the Florida mountainmint, is a perennial herb in the mint family that is endemic to Florida and Georgia.

== Taxonomy ==
Pycnanthemum floridanum was scientifically described and named by Elizabeth Fern Grant and Carl Clawson Epling in 1943 in the book A study of Pycnanthemum (Labiatae). It is classified in the genus Pycnanthemum with the family Lamiaceae. It has no synonyms.

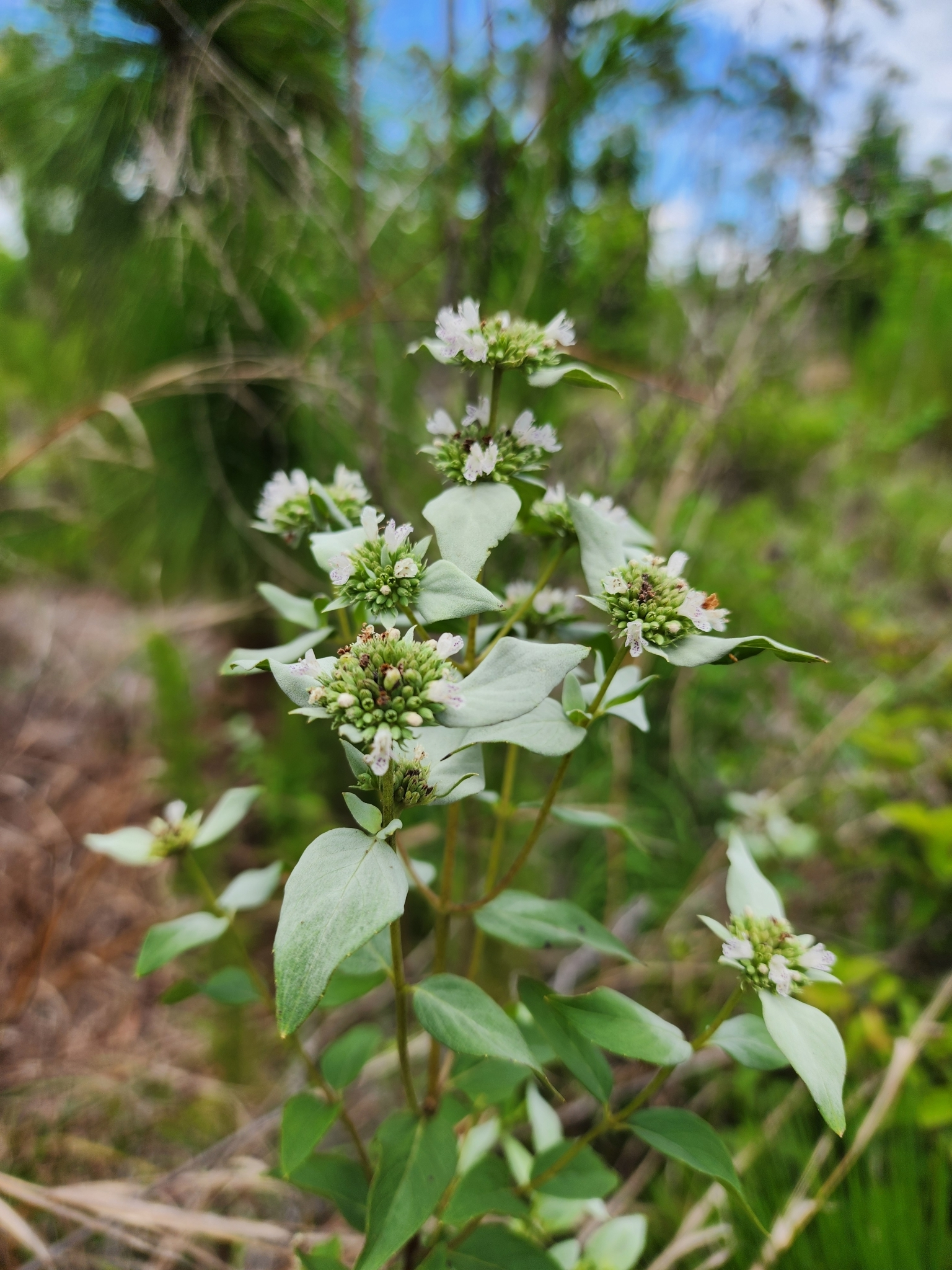

== Distribution and habitat ==
Pycnanthemum floridanum is found in southeastern Georgia to northern peninsular Florida and eastern panhandle Florida. It is found in longleaf pine sandhills.
