= Pycnanthemum pilosum =

Scientific classification
- Kingdom: Plantae
- Clade: Tracheophytes
- Clade: Angiosperms
- Clade: Eudicots
- Clade: Asterids
- Order: Lamiales
- Family: Lamiaceae
- Genus: Pycnanthemum
- Species: P. pilosum

Binomial name
- Pycnanthemum pilosum Nutt.

Species of plant

Pycnanthemum pilosum, commonly known as the hairy mountain mint, American mountain mint, and whorled mountain mint, is a herbaceous perennial plant in the genus Pycnanthemum native to North America.

== Description ==
Pycnanthemum pilosum is a herbaceous perennial plant. It has a minty odor.

It spreads by both rhizomes and seed. Blooms are present from July to September.

== Range ==
It can be found in the eastern and central United States.

== Protection ==
Pycnanthemum pilosum is protected in Michigan.

== Uses ==
It can be used to make potpourri.

It provides a significant food source for honeybees.
