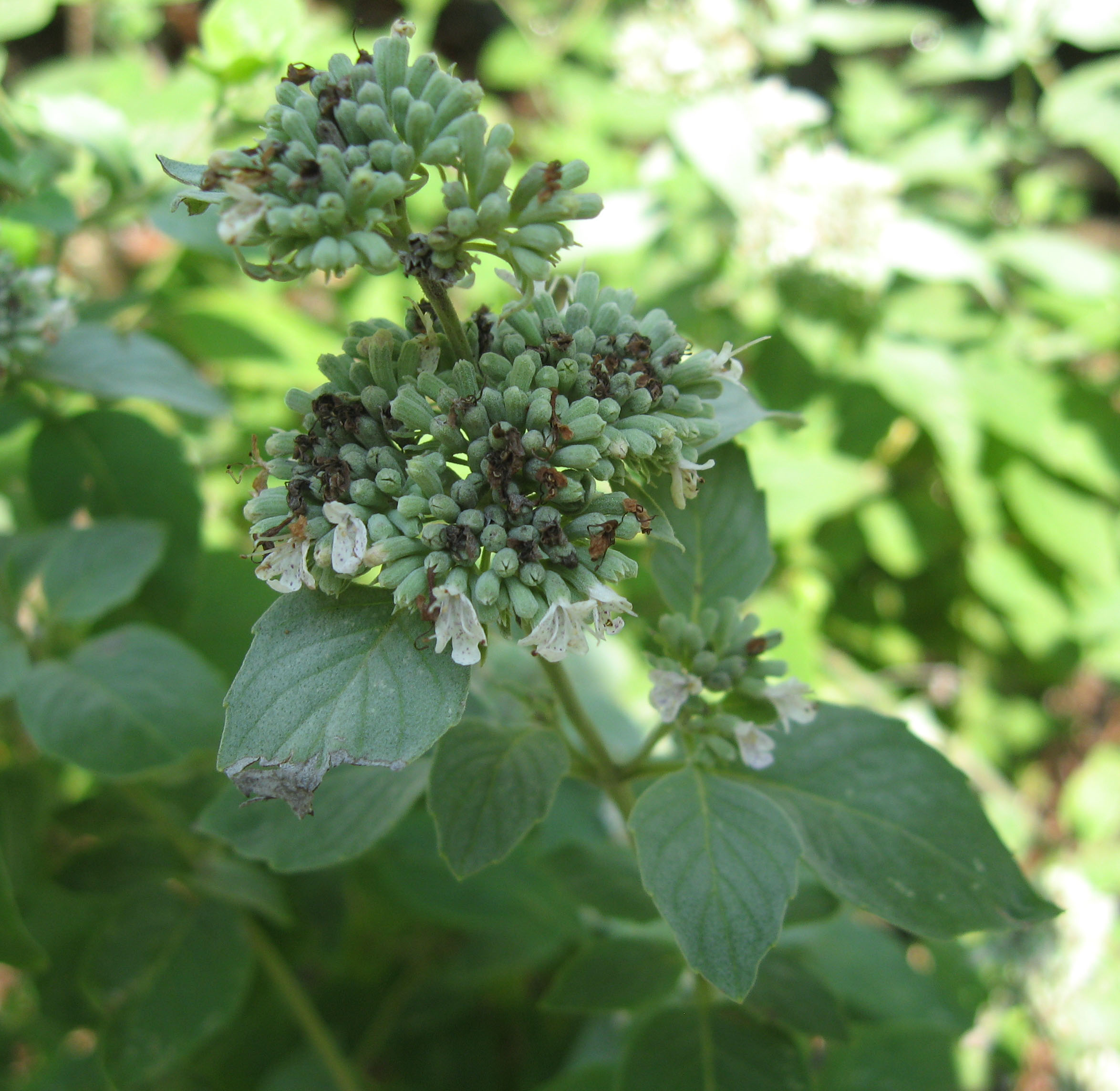

Conservation status
- Vulnerable (NatureServe)

Scientific classification
- Kingdom: Plantae
- Clade: Tracheophytes
- Clade: Angiosperms
- Clade: Eudicots
- Clade: Asterids
- Order: Lamiales
- Family: Lamiaceae
- Genus: Pycnanthemum
- Species: P. curvipes

Binomial name
- Pycnanthemum curvipes (Greene) E.Grant & Epling

= Pycnanthemum curvipes =

Species of flowering plant

Pycnanthemum curvipes is a species of flowering plant in the mint family known by the common name stone mountainmint. It is native to the Southeastern United States, where it is found in Alabama, Georgia, North Carolina, and Tennessee. Its preferred habitat is dry, rocky woodlands and outcrops.

This species is rare throughout its range, and is only found in small numbers in widely dispersed populations. It produces corymbs of purple-spotted flowers in the summer.
