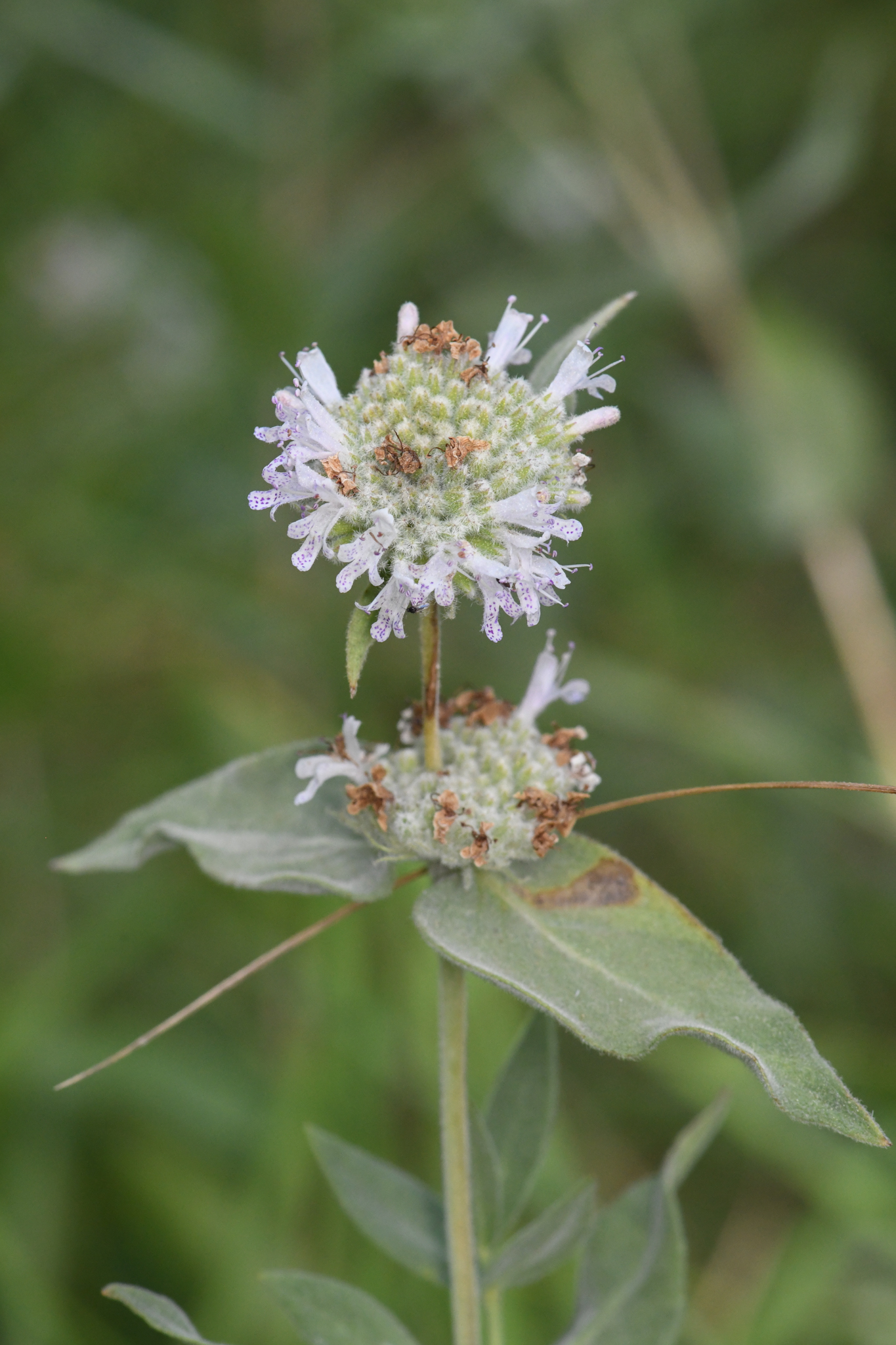

Scientific classification
- Kingdom: Plantae
- Clade: Tracheophytes
- Clade: Angiosperms
- Clade: Eudicots
- Clade: Asterids
- Order: Lamiales
- Family: Lamiaceae
- Genus: Pycnanthemum
- Species: P. californicum

Binomial name
- Pycnanthemum californicum Torr. ex Durand

= Pycnanthemum californicum =

Species of flowering plant

Pycnanthemum californicum is a species of flowering plant in the mint family known by the common name Sierra mint, mountain mint, and California mint.

== Distribution ==
The plant is endemic to California, where it is native to the Sierra Nevada, Peninsular Ranges, Eastern Transverse Ranges, and Inner Northern California Coast Ranges.

It grows at elevations of 500–1,900 metres (1,600–6,200 ft), in chaparral, California oak woodland, California mixed evergreen forest, and Yellow pine forest habitats.

== Description ==
Pycnanthemum californicum is a perennial herb growing erect 0.5–1 metre (1.6–3.3 ft) in height. It has hairless to fuzzy, aromatic herbage. The oppositely arranged leaves are lance-shaped to nearly oval, each a few centimeters long.

The inflorescences are located in clusters about the stem just above each upper pair of leaves. Each flower has a whitish upper lip and a purplish lower lip, sometimes with spots. The bloom period is June through September.
