= Pilot Mound State Forest =

Forest in Iowa, United States

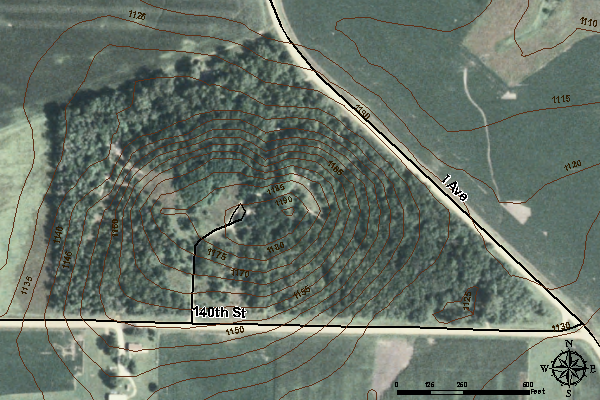
- Aerial photograph and topography of the forest.

- Location within Iowa Location within the United States
- Location: Boone County, Iowa, United States
- Coordinates: 42°9′11″N 94°0′31″W
- Area: 33 acres (13 ha)
- Elevation: 1,150 ft (350 m)
- Established: 1939
- Administrator: Iowa Department of Natural Resources

Pilot Mound State Forest is located in Boone County, Iowa, in the southeast corner of the city of Pilot Mound and 8 miles (13 km) northwest of Boone. The forest sits atop a 70-foot (21 m) glacial mound of the same name.

== History ==
The land that would become Pilot Mound State Forest was donated to the state of Iowa in 1939 by B. P. Holst. The mound of the same name within the forest was once used as a natural water tower for the city of Pilot Mound. The land is used for study and research of forest growth.

== Access ==
Pilot Mound State Forest lies near the intersection of I Avenue and 140th Street in Boone County. A narrow access road to the since-removed water tower begins at 140th Street and ends at the top of the mound, which is the second-highest point in the county. Picnicking, hiking, and hunting are permitted within the boundaries of the forest.
