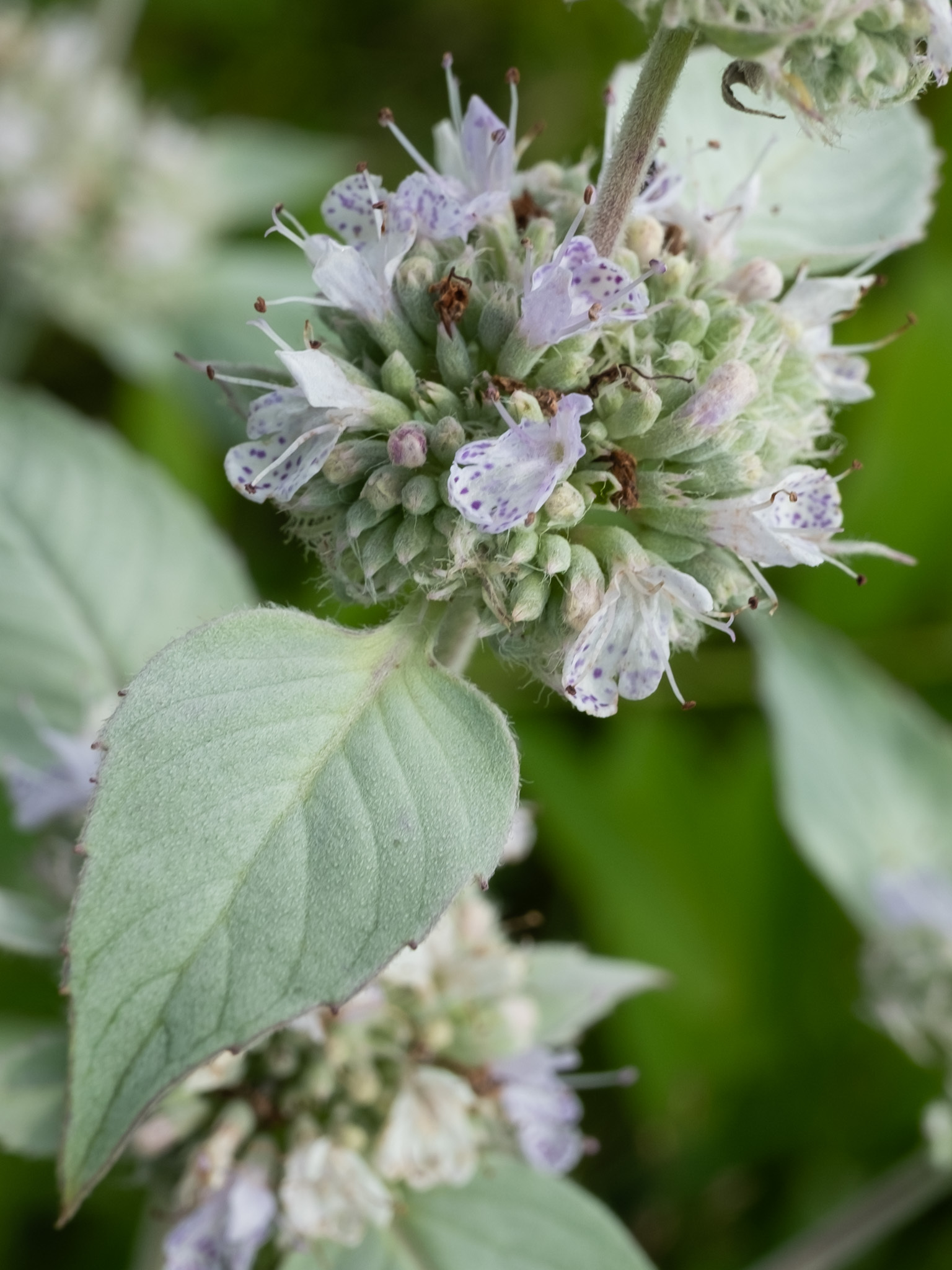
- Pycnanthemum incanum var. incanum

Conservation status
- Secure (NatureServe)

Scientific classification
- Kingdom: Plantae
- Clade: Tracheophytes
- Clade: Angiosperms
- Clade: Eudicots
- Clade: Asterids
- Order: Lamiales
- Family: Lamiaceae
- Genus: Pycnanthemum
- Species: P. incanum

Binomial name
- Pycnanthemum incanum (L.) Michx.

Synonyms
- Clinopodium incanum L.; Koellia incana (L.) Kuntze.; Origanum punctatum Poir.; Pycnanthemum incanum var. loomisii Fernald; Pycnanthemum puberulum E.Grant & Epling

= Pycnanthemum incanum =

Hoary mountainmint

Species of flowering plant

Pycnanthemum incanum, with the common name hoary mountainmint, "mountain mint", wild basil or hoary basil, is a herbaceous perennial in the mint family.

== Distribution ==
The plant is widespread across Eastern United States and into Ontario, Canada. It prefers rocky, gravelly or sandy soil, and typically grows in woods, thickets, fields, and hills.

== Conservation ==
It is listed as an endangered species in Vermont and New Hampshire, and in Ontario where there are only two remaining populations located within a single stretch of oak savanna near Burlington. There is currently a recovery strategy in place organized by the Ontario Ministry of Natural Resources to monitor these last populations.

== Description ==
Pycnanthemum incanum grows to 2 to 4 feet (0.6 to 1.2 m) high by 4 feet (1.2 m) wide. The stems are covered with a soft, whitish down. A vigorous and often aggressive grower, this plant spreads by long rhizomes.

White blooms appear from July to September. Pycnanthemum means "dense flower-clusters" in Greek, and the flowers are favored by butterflies, moths, honeybees, and some species of wasps.

== Varieties ==
There are two varieties:

- Pycnanthemum incanum var. incanum - Ontario, eastern US
- Pycnanthemum incanum var. puberulum (E.Grant & Epling) Fernald - West Virginia, Alabama, North + South Carolina

== Uses ==
When crushed, the leaves emit a strong minty aroma, and are often used to flavor teas.

== Medicinal use ==
This species contains tannin and is considered to be an astringent.

The Choctaw put the mashed leaves in warm water, which the patient drank, and which was poured over the head to relieve headaches. For patients who were sickly all the time, the leaves were mashed in water, the doctor took a mouthful of water, and blew it onto the patient, three times on the head, three times on the back, and three times on the chest. Before the next sunrise, the patient was bathed in the medicine.

The Koasati mashed the leaves in water, and used the water to treat laziness. The patient bathed his face in the cold water and drank it. For nosebleeds, the plant was wetted, and put up into the nostrils to stop the bleed. The roots were boiled along with Black Willow, and drunk to relieve headache.

It is considered to be a food source for large mammals, as well.
