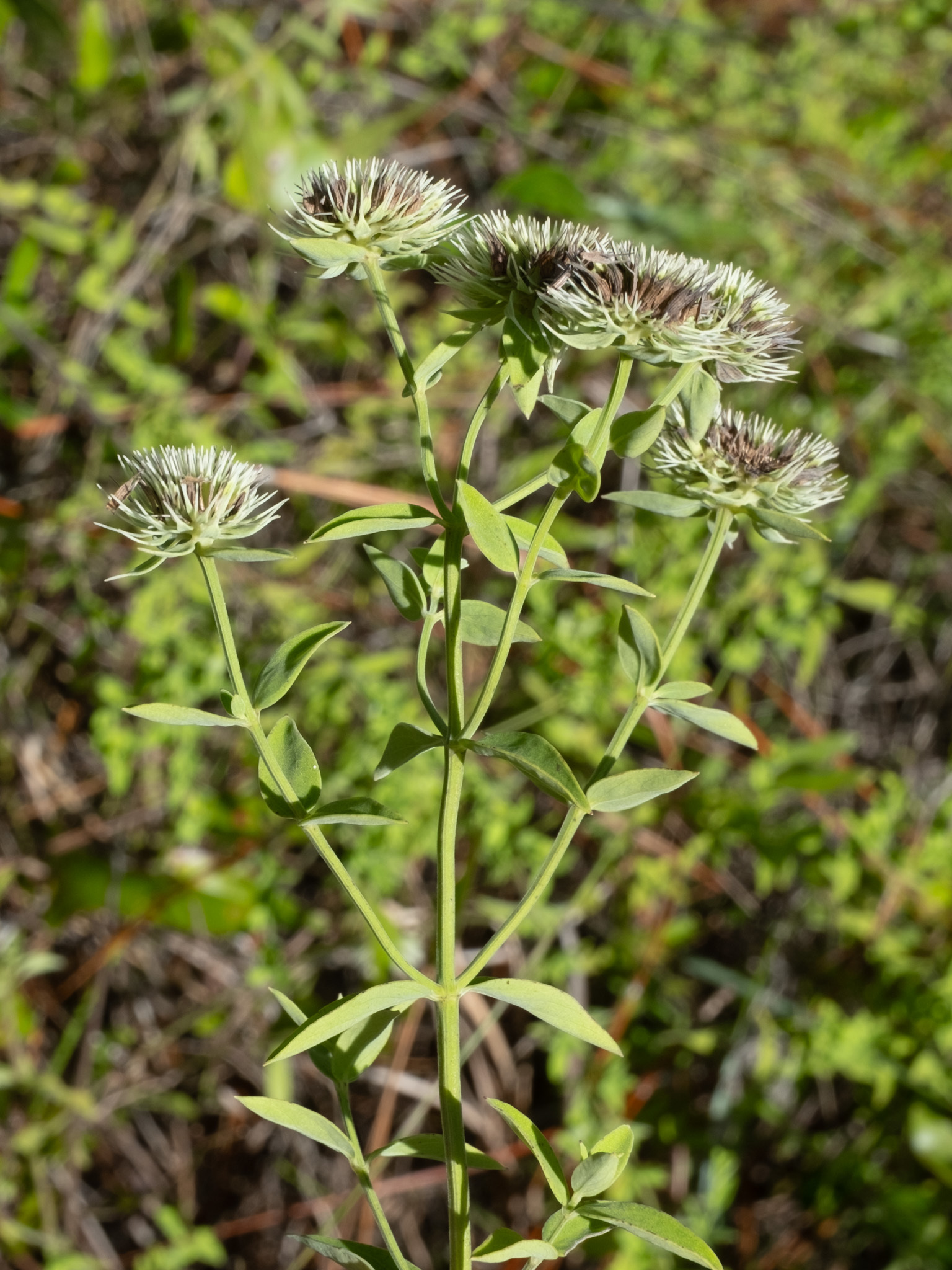

Scientific classification
- Kingdom: Plantae
- Clade: Tracheophytes
- Clade: Angiosperms
- Clade: Eudicots
- Clade: Asterids
- Order: Lamiales
- Family: Lamiaceae
- Genus: Pycnanthemum
- Species: P. flexuosum

Binomial name
- Pycnanthemum flexuosum (Walter) Britton, Sterns, & Poggenb.

= Pycnanthemum flexuosum =

Species of plant

Pycnanthemum flexuosum, commonly known as savanna mint, or savanna mountain-mint, is an herbaceous perennial plant native to the southeastern United States.

== Description ==
Pycnanthemum flexuosum grows from elongate rhizomes and produces erect, quadrangular, freely branched stems. Inflorescences consist of compact, often head-like cymules arranged in terminal thyrses. The calyx is five-toothed and ranges from zygomorphic to actinomorphic; the corolla is zygomorphic and two-lipped, with an entire or notched upper lip and a three-lobed lower lip. There are four usually exserted stamens and a two-cleft, exserted stigma. Plants are canescent, with sharply to rounded-angled stems reaching 40–110 cm in height. Leaves are elliptic to elliptic-lanceolate, 1.5–5 cm long and 3–15 mm wide, with acute to obtuse tips and margins that are crenate with 1–4 teeth per side or rarely entire; bases are cuneate to rounded, and petioles are 0.5–5 mm long. The inflorescence forms flat-topped to high-domed heads 2–4 cm across, becoming more open in fruit. Bracts are canescent, aristate, and often whitened. The calyx is slightly zygomorphic with a 4–4.8 mm tube and white, acicular teeth 2.3–3.3 mm long. The corolla is white to lavender, 4–6 mm long. Mericarps are dark brown, oblong-ovoid, 1–1.3 mm long, and long-bearded at the apex.

== Distribution and habitat ==
Pycnanthemum flexuosum is distributed from southeastern Virginia south to northeastern Florida and west to panhandle Florida and southern Mississippi. There are also disjunct populations inland in southern central Tennessee and in bogs and rock outcrops in southwestern North Carolina.
