= List of flora of Pennsylvania =

This page alphabetically lists some known plant species occurring in the US state of Pennsylvania. Currently about 2,100 native and 1,300 non-native plant species are known in Pennsylvania. According to Pennsylvania Department of Conservation and Natural Resources, the known species make up 37% of Pennsylvania's total wild plant flora. More non-native species present in Pennsylvania are identified every year.

Natives are marked with (N), non-natives marked with (I). As-of-yet uncertain entries not marked. Plants generally under scientific name.

== A ==
- Abies balsamea balsamea (I)
- Abies balsamea phenerolepis (N)
- Acer negundo (N)
- Acer nigrum (N)
- Acer pensylvanicum (N)
- Acer rubrum (N)
- Acer saccharinum (N)
- Acer saccharum (N)
- Acer spicatum (N)
- Acorus americanus (N)
- Adiantum pedatum (N)
- Adlumia fungosa (N)
- Aesculus flava (N)
- Aesculus glabra (N)
- Ailanthus altissima (I)
- Alisma subcordatum (N)
- Alisma triviale (N)
- Allium canadense (N)
- Allium tricoccum (N)
- Amauropelta noveboracensis (N)
- Amelanchier bartramiana (N)
- Amelanchier canadensis (N)
- Amelanchier humilis (N)
- Amelanchier laevis (N)
- Amelanchier nantucketensis (N)
- Amelanchier sanguinea (N)
- Ampelopsis cordata (N)
- Amphicarpaea bracteata (N)
- Andromeda polifolia latifolia (N)
- Apios americana (N)
- Apocynum cannabinum (N)
- Aquilegia canadensis (N)
- Aralia hispida (N)
- Aralia nudicaulis (N)
- Aralia racemosa (N)
- Aralia spinosa (N)
- Arctostaphylos uva-ursi (N)
- Arisaema dracontium (N)
- Arisaema triphyllum (N)
- Aristolochia macrophylla (N)
- Aronia arbutifolia (N)
- Aronia melanocarpa (N)
- Asarum canadense (N)
- Asimina triloba (N)
- Asplenium rhizophyllum (N)
- Athyrium filix-femina (N)

== B ==
- Barbarea orthoceras (N)
- Berberis aquifolium (I)
- Berberis canadensis (N)
- Berberis thunbergii (I)
- Betula alleghaniensis (N)
- Betula lenta (N)
- Betula nigra (N)
- Betula papyrifera (N)
- Betula populifolia (N)
- Blephilia ciliata (N)
- Blephilia hirsuta (N)
- Borodinia laevigata (N)

== C ==
- Caltha palustris (N)
- Calycanthus floridus (N)
- Camassia scilloides (N)
- Campsis radicans (N)
- Cardamine pensylvanica (N)
- Carex abscondita (N)
- Carex aestivalis (N)
- Carex aggregata (N)
- Carex alata (N)
- Carex albicans (N)
- Carex albolutescens (N)
- Carex albursina (N)
- Carex alopecoidea (N)
- Carex amphibola (N)
- Carex annectens (N)
- Carex appalachica (N)
- Carex aquatilis (N)
- Carex arctata (N)
- Carex argyrantha (N)
- Carex atherodes (N)
- Carex atlantica (N)
- Carex aurea (N)
- Carex backii (N)
- Carex baileyi (N)
- Carex barrattii (N)
- Carex bebbii (N)
- Carex bicknellii (N)
- Carex blanda (N)
- Carex brevior (N)
- Carex bromoides (N)
- Carex brunnescens (N)
- Carex bullata (N)
- Carex bushii (N)
- Carex buxbaumii (N)
- Carex canescens (N)
- Carex careyana (N)
- Carex cephalophora (N)
- Carex chordorrhiza (N)
- Carex collinsii (N)
- Carex communis (N)
- Carex comosa (N)
- Carex conjuncta (N)
- Carex conoidea (N)
- Carex crawei (N)
- Carex crawfordii (N)
- Carex crinita (N)
- Carex cristatella (N)
- Carex cryptolepis (N)
- Carex cumberlandensis (N)
- Carex cumulata (N)
- Carex davisii (N)
- Carex debilis (N)
- Carex deflexa (N)
- Carex demissa (I)
- Carex deweyana (N)
- Carex diandra (N)
- Carex digitalis (N)
- Carex disperma (N)
- Carex eburnea (N)
- Carex echinata (N)
- Carex emoryi (N)
- Carex exilis (N)
- Carex ferruginea (I)
- Carex festucacea (N)
- Carex flacca (I)
- Carex flava (N)
- Carex foenea (N)
- Carex folliculata (N)
- Carex formosa (N)
- Carex frankii (N)
- Carex fraseriana (N)
- Carex garberi (N)
- Carex gracillima (N)
- Carex granularis (N)
- Carex gravida (N)
- Carex grayi (N)
- Carex grisea (N)
- Carex gynandra (N)
- Carex haydenii (N)
- Carex hirsutella (N)
- Carex hirtifolia (N)
- Carex hitchcockiana (N)
- Carex houghtoniana
- Carex hystericina (N)
- Carex interior (N)
- Carex intumescens (N)
- Carex jamesii (N)
- Carex juniperorum
- Carex kobomugi (I)
- Carex lacustris (N)
- Carex lasiocarpa (N)
- Carex laxiculmis laxiculmis (N)
- Carex leporina
- Carex leptalea harperi (N)
- Carex leptonervia (N)
- Carex limosa (N)
- Carex livida
- Carex longii (N)
- Carex lucorum (N)
- Carex lupuliformis (N)
- Carex lupulina (N)
- Carex lurida (N)
- Carex trisperma (N)
- Carex willdenowii (N)
- Carex woodii (N)
- Carpinus caroliniana (N)
- Carya cordiformis (N)
- Carya glabra (N)
- Carya laciniosa (N)
- Carya ovalis (N)
- Carya ovata (N)
- Carya tomentosa (N)
- Castanea dentata (N)
- Ceanothus americanus (N)
- Celtis occidentalis (N)
- Cercis canadensis (N)
- Chaerophyllum procumbens (N)
- Chamaedaphne calyculata (N)
- Chimaphila maculata (N)
- Chimaphila umbellata cisatlantica (N)
- Cichorium intybus (I)
- Clematis occidentalis (N)
- Clematis ochroleuca (N)
- Clematis viorna (N)
- Clematis virginiana (N)
- Clinopodium vulgare
- Clintonia borealis (N)
- Clitoria mariana (N)
- Conopholis americana (N)
- Cornus alternifolia (N)
- Cornus amomum (N)
- Cornus canadensis (N)
- Cornus florida (N)
- Cornus obliqua (N)
- Cornus racemosa (N)
- Cornus rugosa (N)
- Corylus americana (N)
- Corylus cornuta (N)
- Crataegus arcana (N)
- Crataegus brainerdii (N)
- Crataegus calpodendron (N)
- Crataegus chrysocarpa (N)
- Crataegus crus-galli (N)
- Crataegus flabellata (N)
- Crataegus intricata (N)
- Crataegus macrosperma (N)
- Crataegus pennsylvanica (N)
- Crataegus persimilis (N)
- Crataegus pruinosa (N)
- Crataegus punctata (N)
- Crataegus succulenta (N)
- Croton monanthogynus (N)
- Cryptotaenia canadensis (N)
- Cunila origanoides (N)

== D ==
- Drosera intermedia (N)

== E ==
- Echinocystis lobata (N)
- Epigaea repens (N)
- Equisetum arvense (N)
- Equisetum fluviatile (N)
- Equisetum laevigatum (N)
- Equisetum palustre (N)
- Equisetum sylvaticum (N)
- Erigenia bulbosa (N)
- Euonymus alatus (I)
- Euonymus atropurpureus (N)
- Euphorbia marginata (N)

== F ==
- Fagus grandifolia (N)
- Franklinia alatamaha (I)
- Fraxinus americana (N)
- Fraxinus nigra (N)
- Fraxinus pennsylvanica (N)
- Fraxinus profunda (N)

== G ==
- Gaultheria hispidula (N)
- Gaultheria procumbens (N)
- Gaylussacia baccata
- Gaylussacia brachycera (N)
- Gaylussacia dumosa
- Gaylussacia frondosa (N)
- Gleditsia triacanthos (N)
- Glycyrrhiza lepidota (N)
- Gymnocladus dioicus (N)

== H ==
- Hamamelis virginiana (N)
- Heracleum maximum (N)
- Humulus lupulus lupuloides (N)

== I ==
- Ilex glabra (N)
- Ilex montana (N)
- Ilex mucronata (N)
- Ilex opaca (N)
- Ilex verticillata (N)

== J ==
- Juglans cinerea (N)
- Juglans nigra (N)
- Juniperus virginiana (N)

== K ==
- Kalmia angustifolia (N)
- Kalmia latifolia (N)
- Krigia biflora (N)

== L ==
- Larix laricina (N)
- Lepidium virginicum (N)
- Ligusticum canadense (N)
- Lilium canadense (N)
- Lilium lancifolium (I)
- Lilium philadelphicum (N)
- Lindera benzoin (N)
- Lycopodium clavatum clavatum (N)
- Lycopodium lagopus (N)
- Lyonia ligustrina (N)
- Lysimachia borealis (N)

== M ==
- Magnolia acuminata (N)
- Maianthemum canadense (N)
- Maianthemum racemosum (N)
- Malus coronaria (N)
- Medeola virginiana (N)
- Menispermum canadense (N)
- Mentha arvensis (N)
- Mentha canadensis (N)
- Menyanthes trifoliata minor (N)
- Mikania scandens (N)
- Mitchella repens (N)
- Monarda clinopodia (N)
- Monarda didyma (N)
- Monarda fistulosa (N)
- Monarda media (N)
- Monarda punctata
- Monotropa hypopitys (N)
- Monotropa uniflora (N)
- Morus rubra (N)
- Myrica pensylvanica (N)

== N ==
- Nelumbo lutea (N)
- Nuphar advena (N)
- Nyssa sylvatica (N)

== O ==
- Oenothera biennis (N)
- Onoclea sensibilis (N)
- Oryzopsis asperifolia (N)
- Ostrya virginiana (N)
- Oxalis dillenii (N)
- Oxalis grandis (N)
- Oxalis montana (N)
- Oxalis stricta (N)
- Oxalis violacea (N)
- Oxydendrum arboreum (N)

== P ==
- Panax quinquefolius (N)
- Panax trifolius (N)
- Parthenocissus inserta (N)
- Passiflora lutea (N)
- Persicaria amphibia (N)
- Persicaria arifolia (N)
- Persicaria extremiorientalis (I)
- Persicaria hydropiperoides (N)
- Persicaria lapathifolia (N)
- Persicaria longiseta (I)
- Persicaria maculosa (I)
- Persicaria nepalensis (I)
- Persicaria pensylvanica (N)
- Persicaria punctata (N)
- Persicaria sagittata (N)
- Persicaria virginiana (N)
- Phaseolus polystachios (N)
- Phoradendron leucarpum (N)
- Phragmites americanus (N)
- Phragmites australis (I)
- Physalis virginiana (N)
- Physocarpus opulifolius (N)
- Pilea pumila (N)
- Pinus echinata (N)
- Pinus pungens (N)
- Pinus resinosa (N)
- Pinus rigida (N)
- Pinus strobus (N)
- Pinus virginiana (N)
- Platanus occidentalis (N)
- Podophyllum peltatum (N)
- Polystichum acrostichoides (N)
- Populus balsamifera (N)
- Populus deltoides (N)
- Populus grandidentata (N)
- Populus tremuloides (N)
- Prosartes lanuginosa (N)
- Prunus alleghaniensis (N)
- Prunus pensylvanica (N)
- Prunus pumila depressa (N)
- Prunus pumila susquehannae (N)
- Prunus serotina (N)
- Prunus virginiana (N)
- Ptelea trifoliata (N)
- Pycnanthemum incanum (N)
- Pycnanthemum muticum (N)
- Pycnanthemum pilosum (N)
- Pycnanthemum tenuifolium (N)
- Pycnanthemum torreyi (N)
- Pycnanthemum virginianum (N)
- Pyrularia pubera (N)

== Q ==
- Quercus alba (N)
- Quercus bicolor (N)
- Quercus coccinea (N)
- Quercus ilicifolia (N)
- Quercus macrocarpa (N)
- Quercus marilandica (N)
- Quercus michauxii
- Quercus montana (N)
- Quercus muehlenbergii (N)
- Quercus palustris (N)
- Quercus phellos (N)
- Quercus prinoides (N)
- Quercus rubra (N)
- Quercus shumardii (N)
- Quercus stellata (N)
- Quercus velutina (N)

== R ==
- Ranunculus allegheniensis (N)
- Ranunculus pensylvanicus (N)
- Rhododendron calendulaceum (N)
- Rhododendron canadense (N)
- Rhododendron canescens (N)
- Rhododendron groenlandicum (N)
- Rhododendron periclymenoides (N)
- Rhus copallinum (N)
- Rhus glabra (N)
- Rhus typhina (N)
- Ribes americanum (N)
- Ribes aureum (I)
- Ribes cynosbati (N)
- Ribes glandulosum (N)
- Ribes hudsonianum
- Ribes lacustre (N)
- Ribes triste (N)
- Robinia pseudoacacia (N)
- Rorippa aquatica
- Rosa canina (I)
- Rosa carolina carolina (N)
- Rosa multiflora (I)
- Rosa palustris (N)
- Rosa rugosa (I)
- Rosa setigera (N)
- Rosa virginiana (N)
- Rubus allegheniensis (N)
- Rubus argutus (N)
- Rubus depavitus
- Rubus flagellaris (N)
- Rubus hispidus (N)
- Rubus invisus (N)
- Rubus occidentalis (N)

== S ==
- Salicornia maritima (N)
- Salix amygdaloides
- Salix bebbiana (N)
- Salix caroliniana (N)
- Salix discolor (N)
- Salix exigua (N)
- Salix lucida (N)
- Salix myricoides
- Salix nigra (N)
- Salix pedicellaris (N)
- Salix petiolaris (N)
- Salix sericea (N)
- Sambucus canadensis (N)
- Sambucus racemosa pubens (N)
- Sarracenia purpurea purpurea (N)
- Sicyos angulatus (N)
- Sitobolium punctilobulum (N)
- Sorbus americana (N)
- Staphylea trifolia (N)
- Streptopus amplexifolius (N)
- Streptopus lanceolatus (N)

== T ==
- Taraxacum officinale (I)
- Thuja occidentalis (N)
- Tilia americana (N)
- Toxicodendron vernix (N)
- Trapa natans (I)
- Tsuga canadensis (N)
- Typha angustifolia (I)
- Typha latifolia (N)

== U ==
- Utricularia cornuta (N)
- Utricularia geminiscapa (N)
- Utricularia gibba (N)
- Utricularia inflata (I)
- Utricularia intermedia (N)
- Utricularia juncea (N)
- Utricularia macrorhiza (N)
- Utricularia minor (N)
- Utricularia ochroleuca (N)
- Utricularia olivacea (N)
- Utricularia purpurea (N)
- Utricularia radiata (N)
- Utricularia resupinata (N)
- Utricularia striata (N)
- Uvularia grandiflora (N)
- Uvularia perfoliata (N)
- Uvularia puberula (N)
- Uvularia sessilifolia (N)

== V ==
- Vaccinium angustifolium (N)
- Vaccinium corymbosum (N)
- Vaccinium formosum
- Vaccinium macrocarpon (N)
- Vaccinium pallidum (N)
- Vaccinium stamineum
- Veratrum viride (N)
- Viburnum acerifolium (N)
- Viburnum cassinoides
- Viburnum dentatum (N)
- Viburnum dilatatum (I)
- Viburnum edule (N)
- Viburnum lantanoides
- Viburnum lentago (N)
- Viburnum nudum (N)
- Viburnum prunifolium (N)
- Viburnum rafinesqueanum (N)
- Viburnum recognitum
- Viburnum trilobum (N)
- Viola adunca
- Viola alba (N)
- Viola appalachiensis (N)
- Viola blanda (N)
- Viola brittoniana (N)
- Viola canadensis (N)
- Viola cucullata (N)
- Viola epipsila (I)
- Viola eriocarpa (N)
- Viola hastata
- Viola hirsutula (N)
- Viola labradorica
- Viola lanceolata (N)
- Viola macloskeyi (N)
- Viola minuscula (N)
- Viola nephrophylla (N)
- Viola palmata (N)
- Viola palustris
- Viola pedata
- Viola pubescens (N)
- Viola rafinesquei (N)
- Viola renifolia
- Viola rostrata (N)
- Viola sagittata (N)
- Viola selkirkii (N)
- Viola sororia (N)
- Viola striata
- Viola subsinuata (N)
- Viola tricolor (I)
- Vitis aestivalis (N)
- Vitis labrusca

== W ==
- Wisteria frutescens (N)

== Z ==
- Zanthoxylum americanum (N)
