= Carex shortii =

Carex shortii can refer to the following plant species:

- Carex shortii Steud., a synonym of Carex frankii Kunth
- Carex shortii Torr., a synonym of Carex shortiana Dewey & Torr.
