= Oak sedge =

Oak sedge may refer to:

- Carex pensylvanica, common oak sedge or Pennsylvania sedge
- Carex albicans, white-tinged sedge or oak sedge
