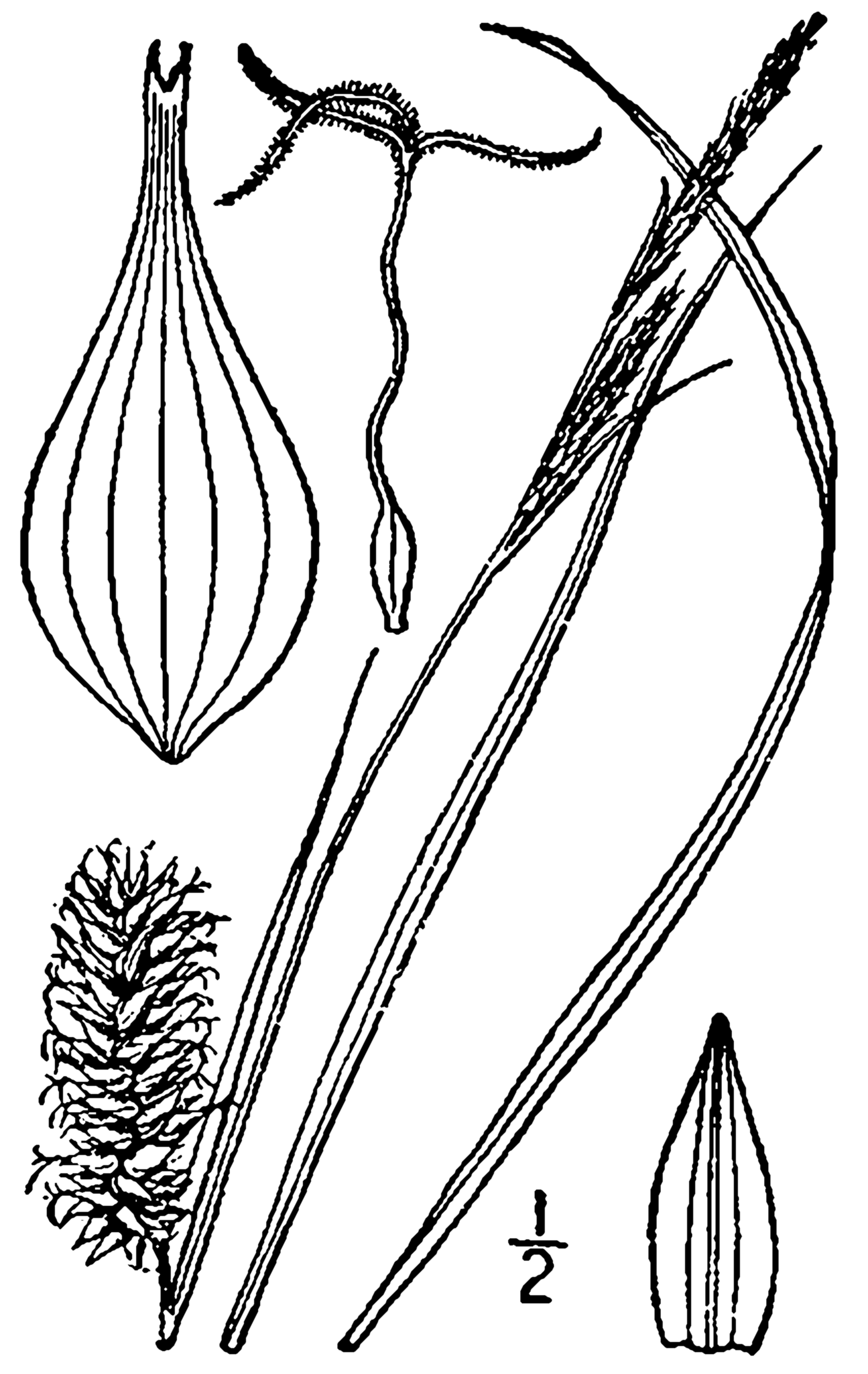

Conservation status
- Secure (NatureServe)

Scientific classification
- Kingdom: Plantae
- Clade: Tracheophytes
- Clade: Angiosperms
- Clade: Monocots
- Clade: Commelinids
- Order: Poales
- Family: Cyperaceae
- Genus: Carex
- Species: C. bullata

Binomial name
- Carex bullata Willd.

Synonyms
- Carex greenii Boeckeler

= Carex bullata =

Species of plant

Carex bullata is a tussock-forming species of perennial sedge in the family Cyperaceae. It is native to south eastern parts of Canada and eastern parts of the United States. It has the common name of the button sedge.

== Taxonomy ==
The name 'bullata' is from the Latin 'bullatus' which means inflated, referring to the inflated perigynia. After being discovered in 1894 it was collected in Long Island through 1929, which was resumed in 1959 when NY State Museum collected it again.

== Description ==
The stem leaf blade width is between 1.8 and 5 millimeters. The lowest bract has no sheath. The lowest spike has a peduncle. The highest spike has only staminate flowers. The perigynium has no hairs and is from 5.9 to 10.2 millimeters in length. The leaf sheath is tinted pink, red or purple. The leaf sheath is smooth and hairless.

== Distribution ==
It has a global rank of G5 meaning secure. It was last reviewed in 1997. It also has many local ranks in Canada and the US. It has a rank of S5 meaning secure in New Jersey, a rank of S4 in Nova Scotia and Virginia, a rank of S3 in Delaware, Maryland, and Tennessee, a rank of S2 in Maine and North Carolina, and a rank of S1 in Arkansas, Mississippi, New Hampshire, New York, and Pennsylvania.

In New England, it is found in all counties in Rhode Island, all counties in Massachusetts expect Berkshire county, all counties in Connecticut expect Fairfield and Hartford, Hillsborough and Strafford county in New Hampshire, and York, Cumberland, Oxford, and Penobscot county in Maine.

In Tennessee, It is found in Johnson county, Cannon county, Coffee county, Grundy county, Franklin county, Moore county, and Lincoln county.

In New York, it is found in Nassau county, Orange county, Queens county, Richmond county, Rockland county, and Suffolk county.

== Habitat ==
It is found on stream margins with red maple and sedge marsh. Wet pine barrens along railroads tracks is also a common habitat. They can also be found in wet, muddy banks streams in a sedge meadow. It is associated with the following Carex species, Carex barrattii, Carex comosa, Carex scoparia, Carex silicea, Carex stricta, and Carex vestita. It is commonly found at elevations between 0 and 1,000 feet.

== See also ==
- List of Carex species
