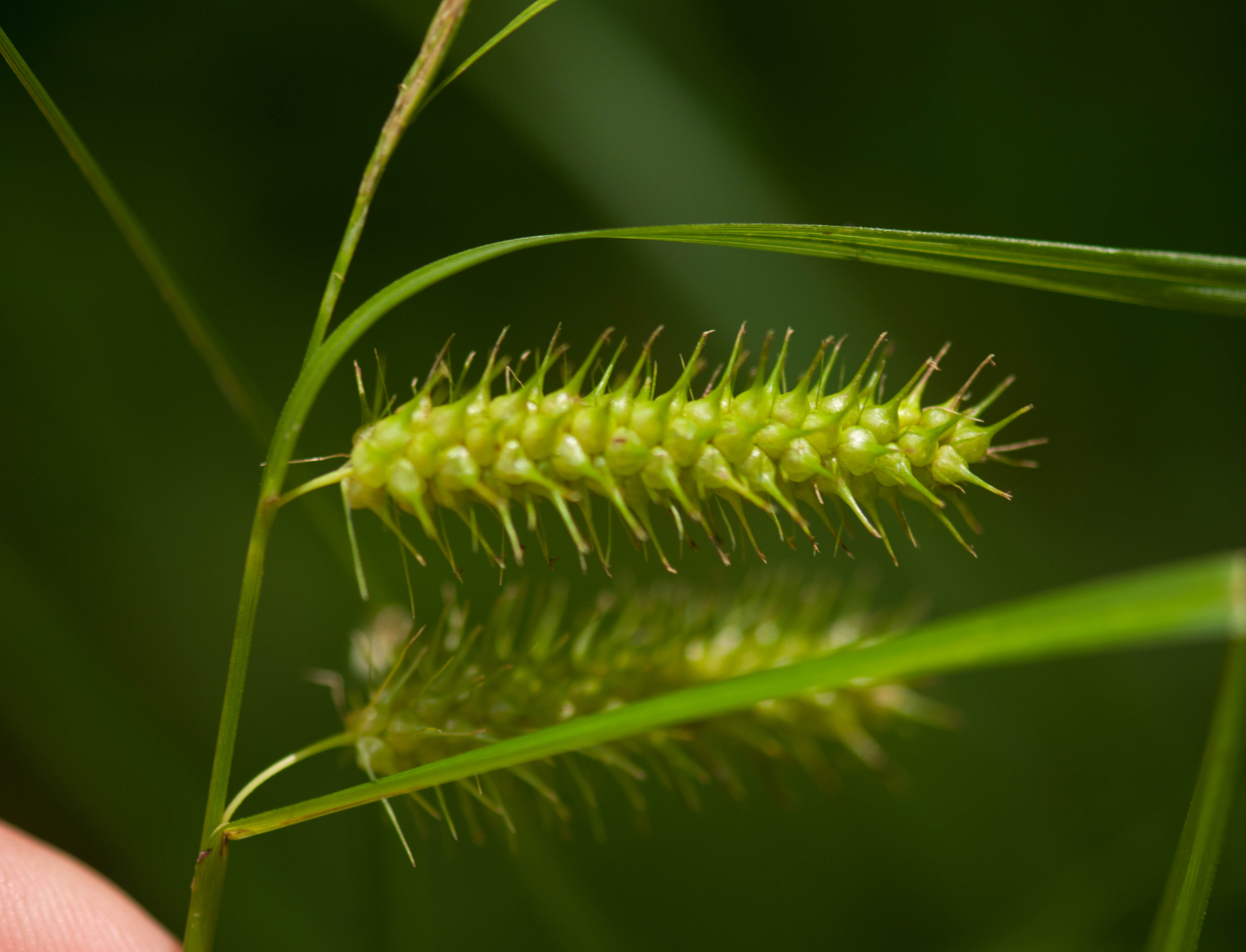

Scientific classification
- Kingdom: Plantae
- Clade: Tracheophytes
- Clade: Angiosperms
- Clade: Monocots
- Clade: Commelinids
- Order: Poales
- Family: Cyperaceae
- Genus: Carex
- Section: Carex sect. Vesicariae
- Species: C. baileyi

Binomial name
- Carex baileyi Britton
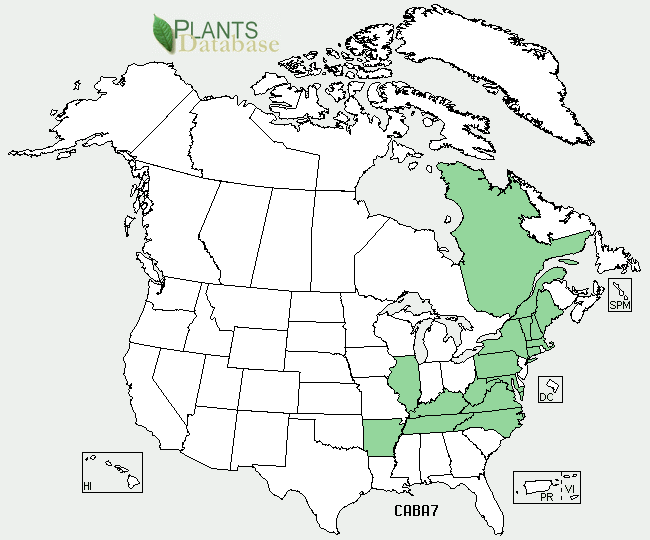

= Carex baileyi =

Species of grass-like plant

Carex baileyi is a sedge in section Vesicariae the genus Carex (true sedges) native to the Appalachian Mountains in Eastern North America. It is commonly called Bailey's sedge. Carex baileyi was named in honor of Liberty Hyde Bailey by its discoverer, Nathaniel Lord Britton.

== Habitat ==
Carex baileyi is an obligate wetland plant which will grow exclusively in wetland areas such as swamps and wet woods. It also occurs in sedge meadows, stream shores, and ditches. It tends to prefer growing from acidic soils.

== Description ==
Carex baileyi is a perennial grass-like herb which grows in clumps much like bunch-grass. The stems grow to 65 cm tall and are triangular like all sedge stems. The bases of the stems are reddish in color. The inflorescence consists of 1-2 pistilate (female) spikes 10-40mm long x 8-13mm wide, and 1 staminate (male) spike at the tip of the stem 15-30mm long x 1.5-2.5mm wide. The male spike is typically upright, whereas the female spikes tend to droop or at least hang horizontal.

Like most sedges in Carex subgenus Carex, the flowers have a three-branched pistil, and produce an achene with a triangular cross-section. The perigynia is 5-7mm long with a long beak comprising about half of the perigynia length. The beak of the perigynia has two small teeth at the tip about .5mm long. The body of the perigynia is inflated around the achene and has 5-9 nerves. The achenes (fruits) are yellow-brown color and 1.5-2mm long x 1mm wide. Below each perigynia is a pistilate scale, this scale is accuminate or rough awned at the tip and between 2.9-9.8mm long x .3-.9mm wide.

Carex baileyi is very closely related to, and may be confused with the more common Carex lurida. These two species overlap significantly in their ranges but differ in structure; C. baileyi is more delicate, having smaller leaves and smaller spikes. Specifically, C. baileyi has spikes .8-1.5 cm thick and leaves 2.4-4mm wide, whereas C. lurida has spikes 1.5-2.2 cm thick and leaves 4–11.5mm wide.

== Taxonomy ==
DNA evidence has raised doubt as to the taxonomic circumscription of C. baileyi. It was found that there are no consistent differences genetically between Carex lurida and Carex baileyi, however, further research is needed.

== Endangered status ==
Carex baileyi is listed as endangered in Massachusetts, threatened in New Hampshire and of special concern in Connecticut and Maine.
