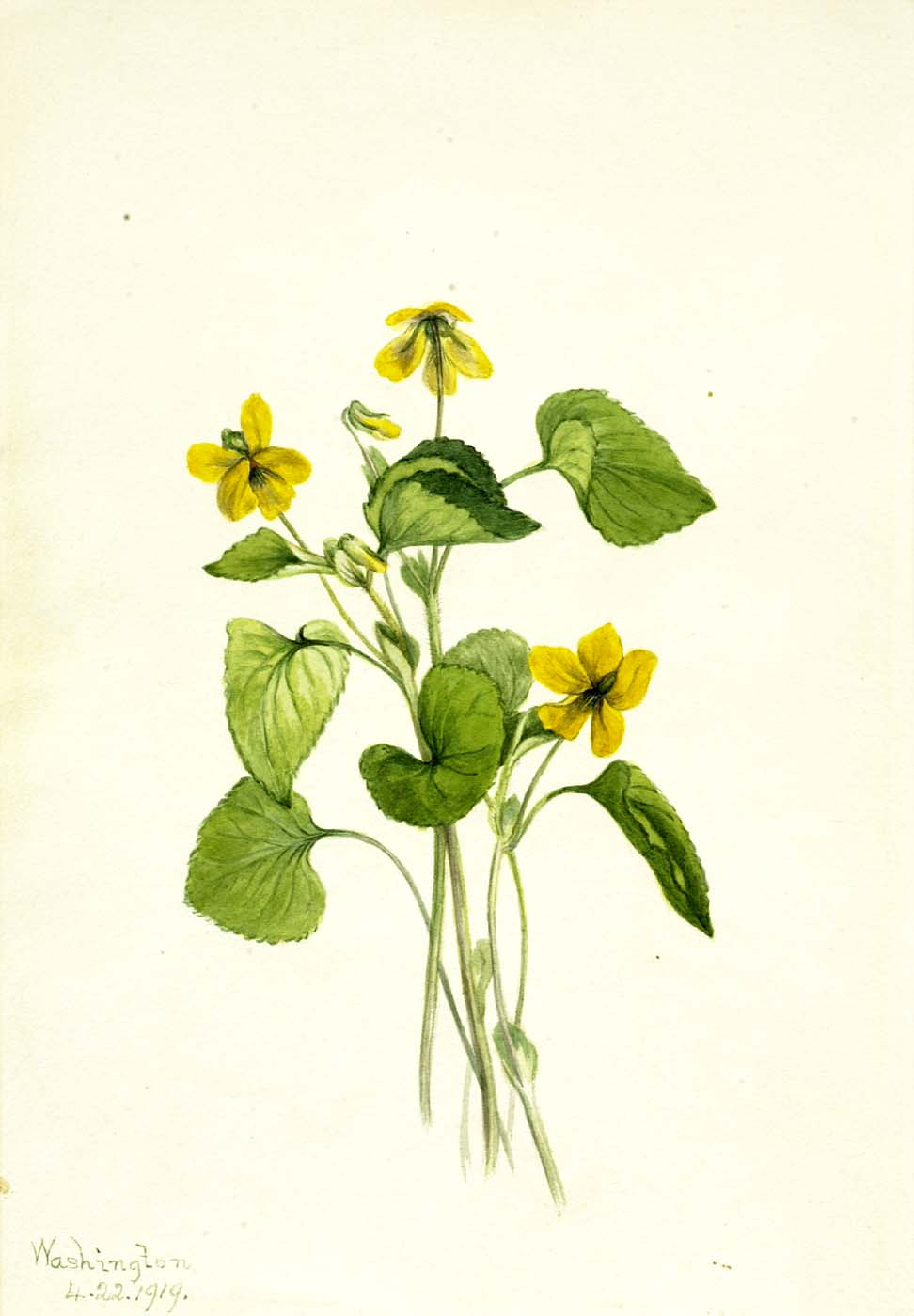
- Botanical illustration by Mary Vaux Walcott
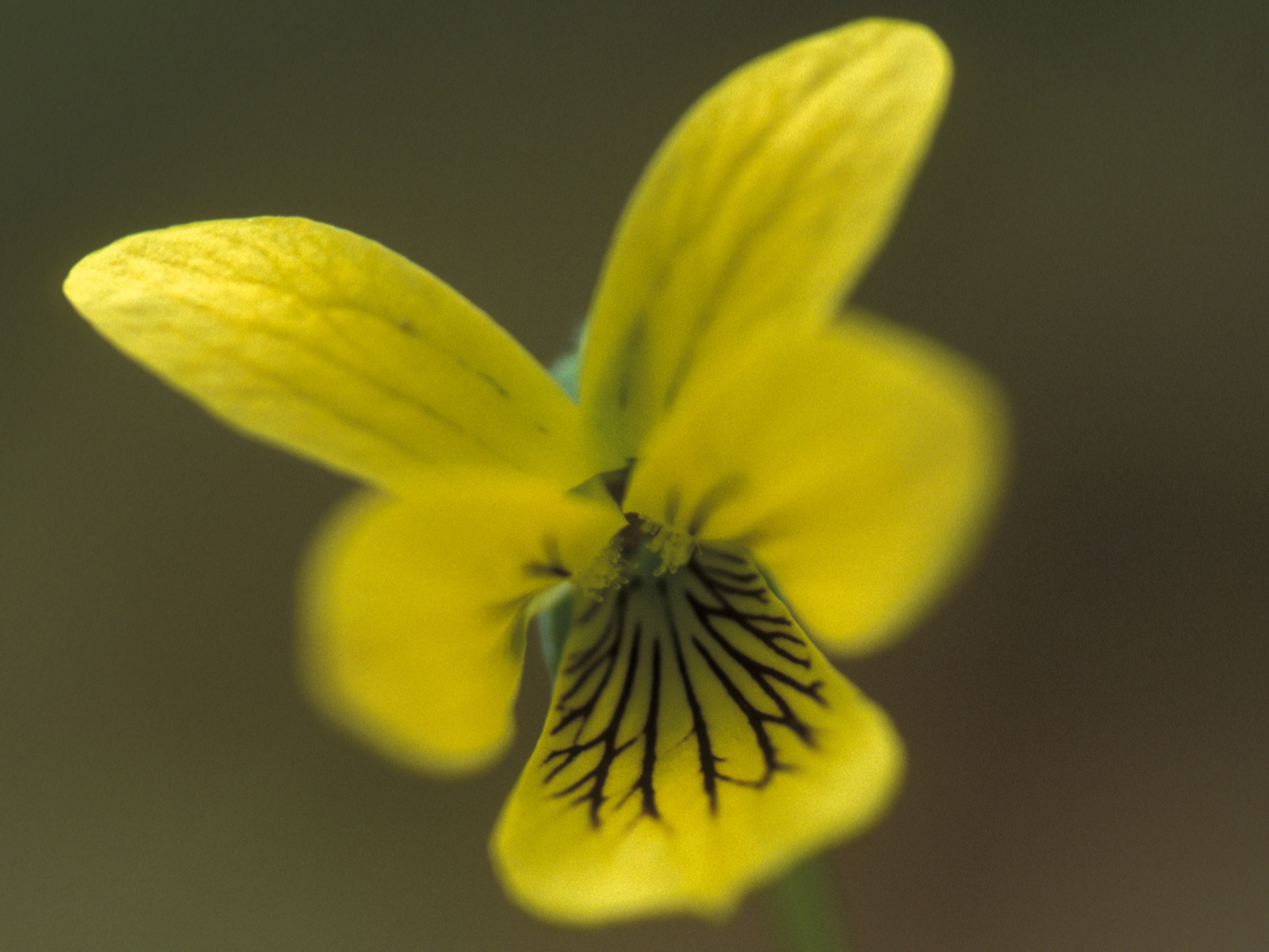
- Extreme close-up of flower

Scientific classification
- Kingdom: Plantae
- Clade: Tracheophytes
- Clade: Angiosperms
- Clade: Eudicots
- Clade: Rosids
- Order: Malpighiales
- Family: Violaceae
- Genus: Viola
- Species: V. eriocarpa

Binomial name
- Viola eriocarpa Schwein.

Synonyms
- List: Crocion achlydophyllum (Greene) Kaczm.; Crocion eriocarpum (Schwein.) Nieuwl.; Crocion scabriuscum Kaczm.; Viola achlydophylla Greene; Viola dasyneura Greene; Viola eriocarpa var. leiocarpa Fernald & Wiegand; Viola eriocarpa f. leiocarpa (Fernald & Wiegand) Deam; Viola eriocarpa var. sessilis Clute; Viola eriocarpa var. typica Grover; Viola pensylvanica var. leiocarpa (Fernald & Wiegand) Fernald; Viola pubescens f. achlydophylla (Greene) Farw.; Viola pubescens f. eriocarpa (Schwein.) Farw.; Viola pubescens var. eriocarpa (Schwein.) N.H.Russell; Viola pubescens var. leiocarpa (Fernald & Wiegand) B.Boivin; Viola pubescens f. leiocarpa (Fernald & Wiegand) Farw.; Viola pubescens var. scabriuscula Torr. & A.Gray; Viola scabriuscula (Torr. & A.Gray) Shafer

= Viola eriocarpa =

Species of plant

Viola eriocarpa (syn. Viola pubescens var. scabriuscula), the smooth yellow violet, is a species of flowering plant in the family Violaceae. It is native to Canada and the United States east of the Rockies. A perennial of forests, it prefers very rich soils. It is extremely difficult to distinguish from Viola pubescens unless both are examined together.

== Description ==
Viola eriocarpa grows up to 35cm tall and has cauline leaves dispersed along its stem. It has golden petals with black lines at the base of them.
