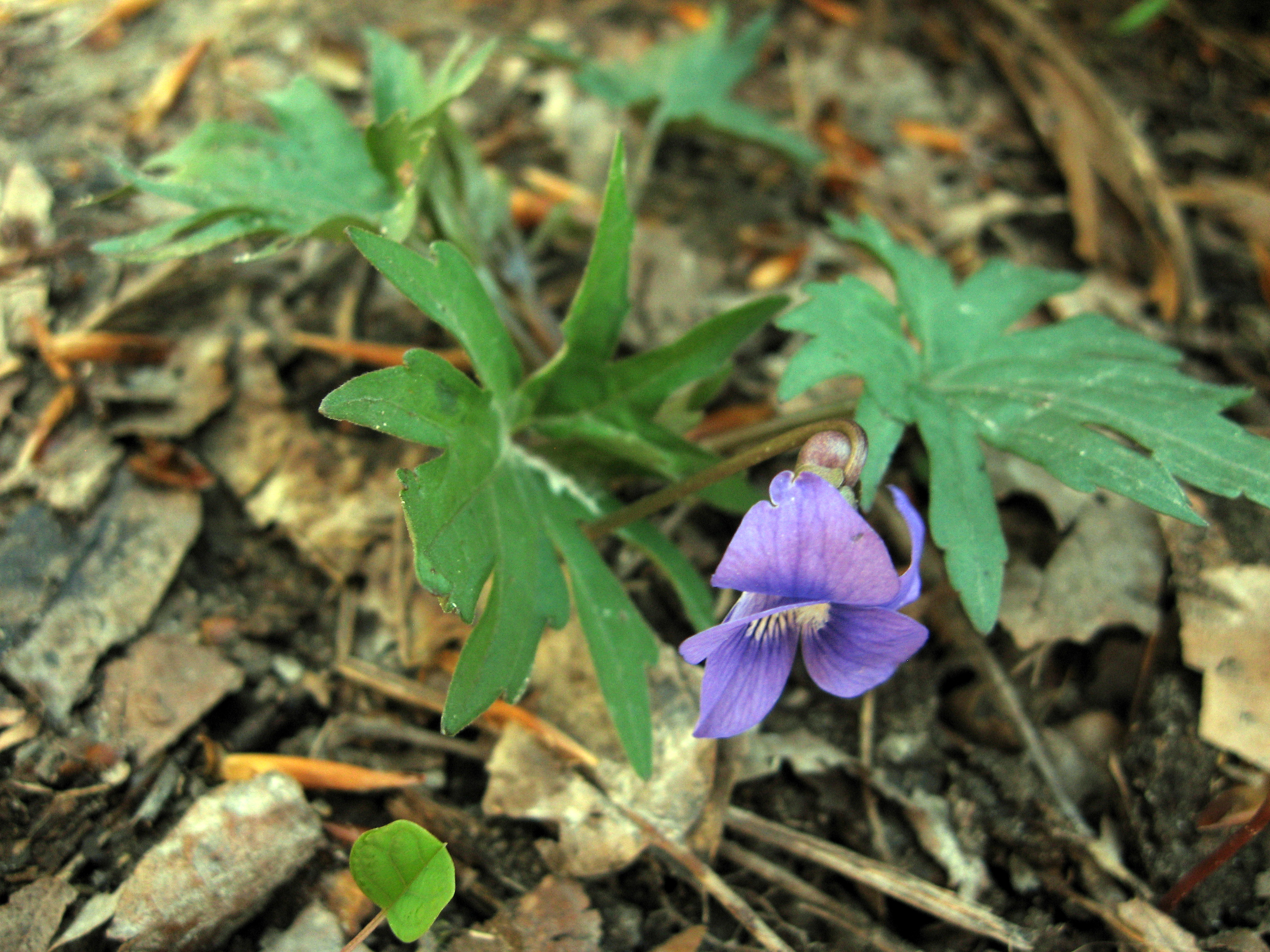

Scientific classification
- Kingdom: Plantae
- Clade: Tracheophytes
- Clade: Angiosperms
- Clade: Eudicots
- Clade: Rosids
- Order: Malpighiales
- Family: Violaceae
- Genus: Viola
- Species: V. subsinuata

Binomial name
- Viola subsinuata Greene

= Viola subsinuata =

Species of flowering plant

Viola subsinuata, commonly called the early blue violet, is a species of flowering plant in the violet family (Violaceae). It is native to eastern North America, where it is primarily found in the Appalachian Mountains and Great Lakes area. Its natural habitat is in loamy forests, often over mafic or calcareous substrates.

Viola subsinuata is a perennial that produces purple flowers in the spring. It is superficially similar to Viola palmata, and it can be distinguished by its earliest flowering leaves being divided and similar to later leaves (unlike V. palmata, which has undivided early leaves and divided later leaves).

This species has a complicated taxonomic history, including much nomenclatural confusion and misidentification. The exact geographic boundaries of this species is poorly understood. A recent study indicates that it likely includes cryptic taxa.
