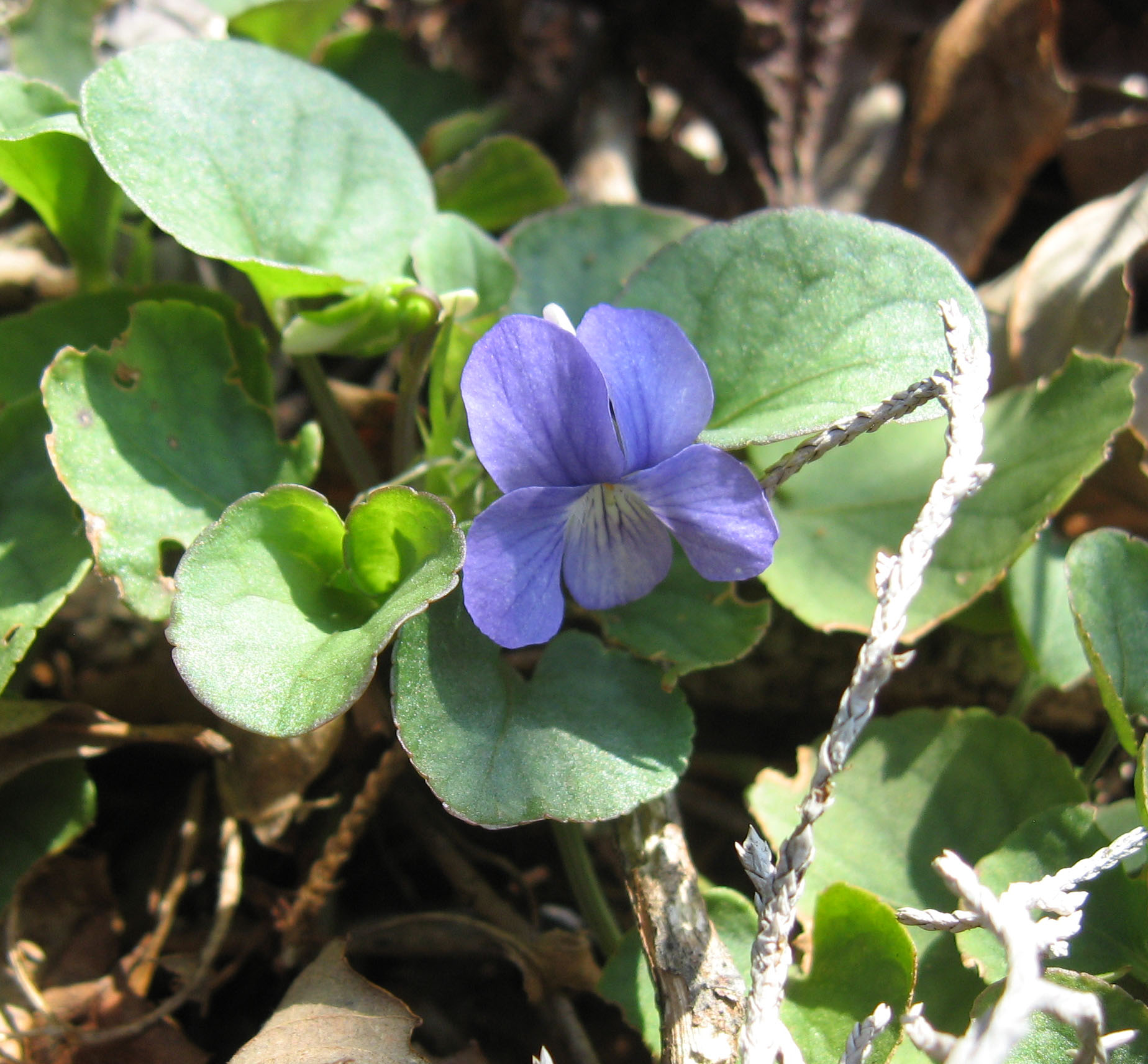

Scientific classification
- Kingdom: Plantae
- Clade: Embryophytes
- Clade: Tracheophytes
- Clade: Spermatophytes
- Clade: Angiosperms
- Clade: Eudicots
- Clade: Rosids
- Order: Malpighiales
- Family: Violaceae
- Genus: Viola
- Species: V. walteri

Binomial name
- Viola walteri House

= Viola walteri =

Species of flowering plant

Viola walteri, the prostrate blue violet, is a perennial plant in the violet family (Violaceae). It is native to Southeastern and Appalachian North America. It is generally uncommon throughout its range, with populations becoming fragmented in the north. Viola walteri is found in rich calcareous forests and woodlands, often in dry rocky areas. It is a spring ephemeral, flowering March through May. It distinguished by its creeping, rooting stolons, which is thought to be indicative of it being transitional between the caulescent and acaulescent violets.

This species is similar to Viola appalachiensis, which was once considered a variety of Viola walteri.
