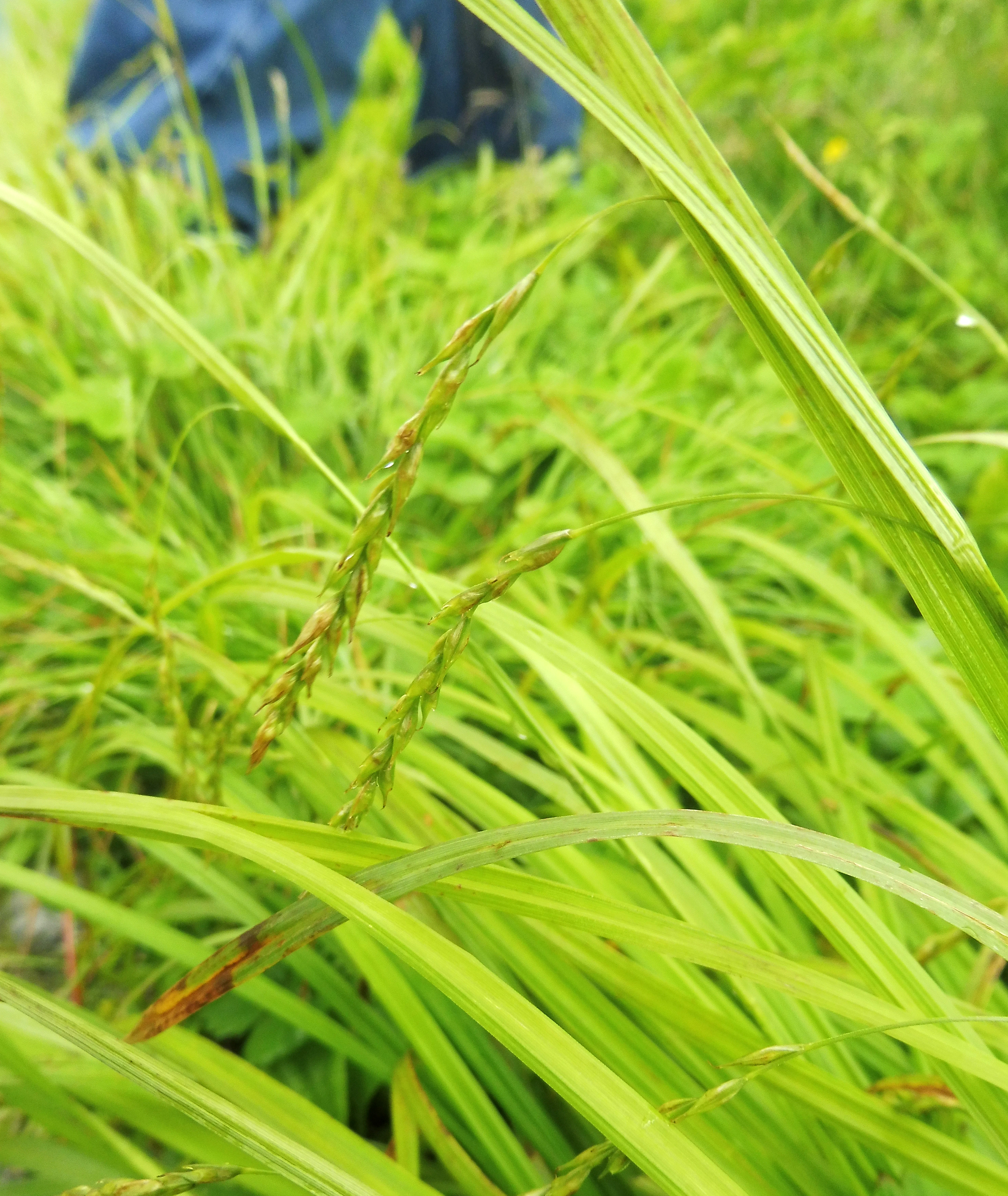
- C. d. var. rudgei

Conservation status
- Least Concern (IUCN 3.1)

Scientific classification
- Kingdom: Plantae
- Clade: Tracheophytes
- Clade: Angiosperms
- Clade: Monocots
- Clade: Commelinids
- Order: Poales
- Family: Cyperaceae
- Genus: Carex
- Species: C. debilis

Binomial name
- Carex debilis Michx., 1803

Synonyms
- Carex tenuis Rudge; Carex allegheniensis Mack.; Carex flexuosa Muhl. ex Willd.

= Carex debilis =

Species of sedge

Carex debilis, also known as white-edge sedge, Rudge's white-edge sedge, and flexuous white-edge sedge, is a species of flowering plant in the sedge family, Cyperaceae. It is native to the eastern North America, where it is found in eastern Canada, the northeastern and midwestern United States, and southward in the Appalachian Mountains.

Carex debilis is a clumping perennial. The variety Carex debilis var. rudgei has smaller perigynia that are broadest near the middle.

== Distribution and habitat ==
The natural habitat of Carex debilis is upland forests, rock outcrops, and Appalachian balds. It is typically found in areas with acidic soil.
