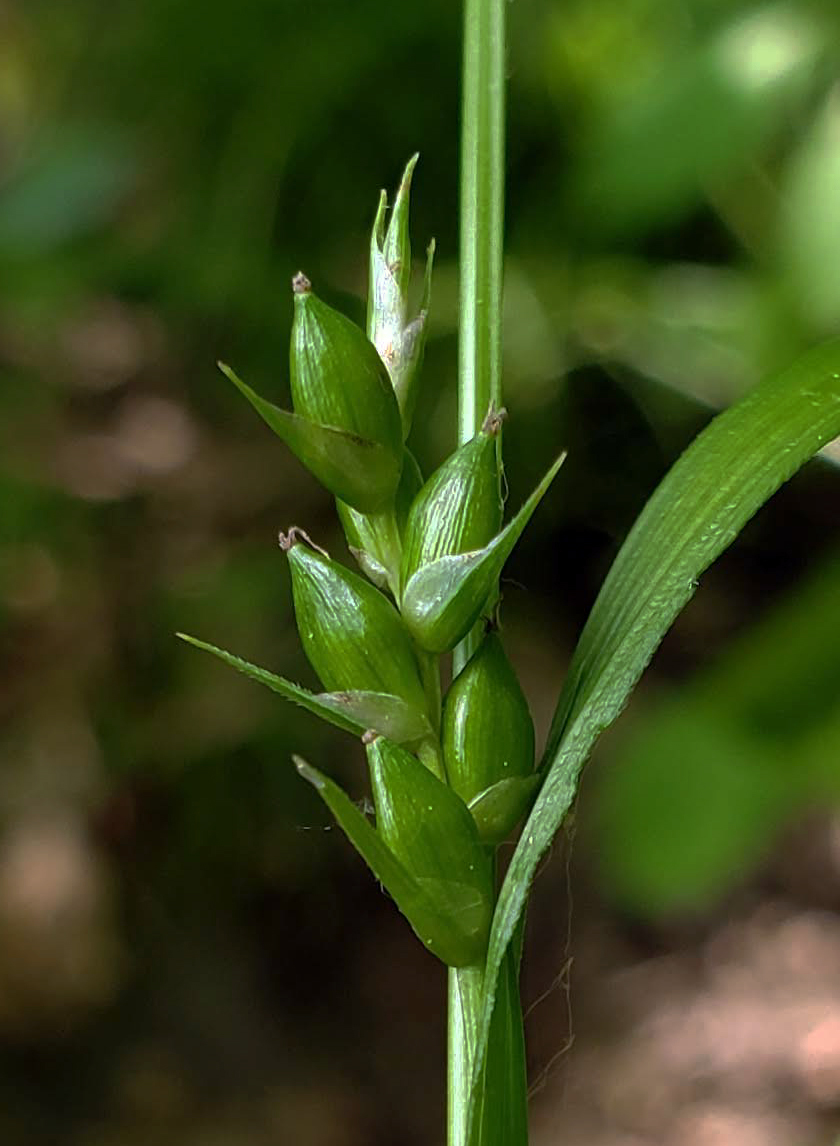
- In CamRock County Park, Wisconsin
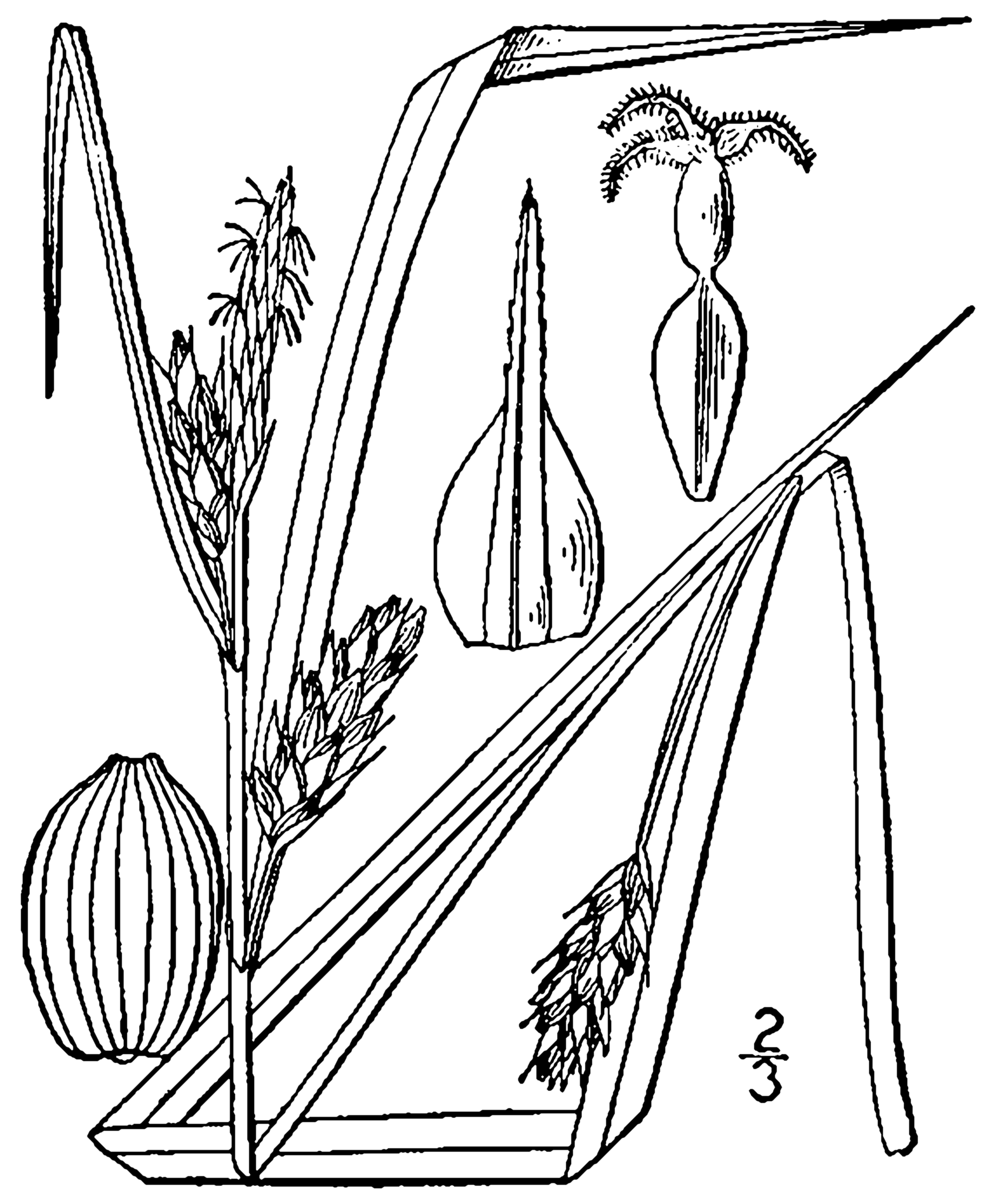
- Botanical illustration

Scientific classification
- Kingdom: Plantae
- Clade: Tracheophytes
- Clade: Angiosperms
- Clade: Monocots
- Clade: Commelinids
- Order: Poales
- Family: Cyperaceae
- Genus: Carex
- Species: C. grisea

Binomial name
- Carex grisea Wahlenb.

Synonyms
- Carex amphibola var. turgida Fernald; Carex turgida (Fernald) J.W.Moore; Manochlaenia grisea (Wahlenb.) Fedde & J.Schust.

= Carex grisea =

Species of plant

Carex grisea, the wood gray sedge or inflated narrow-leaf sedge, is a widespread species of flowering plant in the family Cyperaceae, native to eastern Canada and the central and eastern United States. It resembles and co‑occurs with Carex amphibola in alluvial areas in forests, but where they co‑occur, Carex grisea is usually found in sandier, more alkaline soils.
