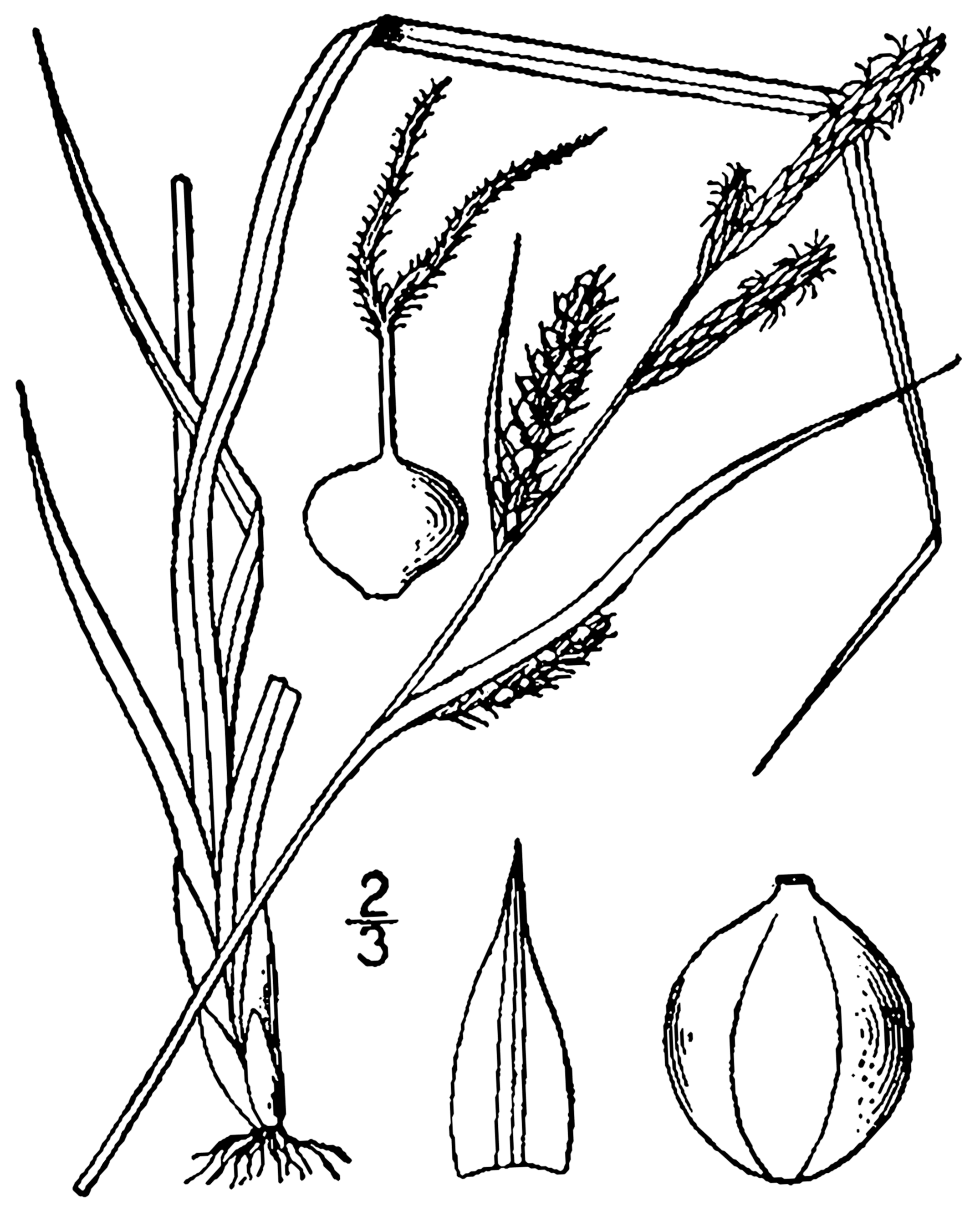
- Botanical illustration
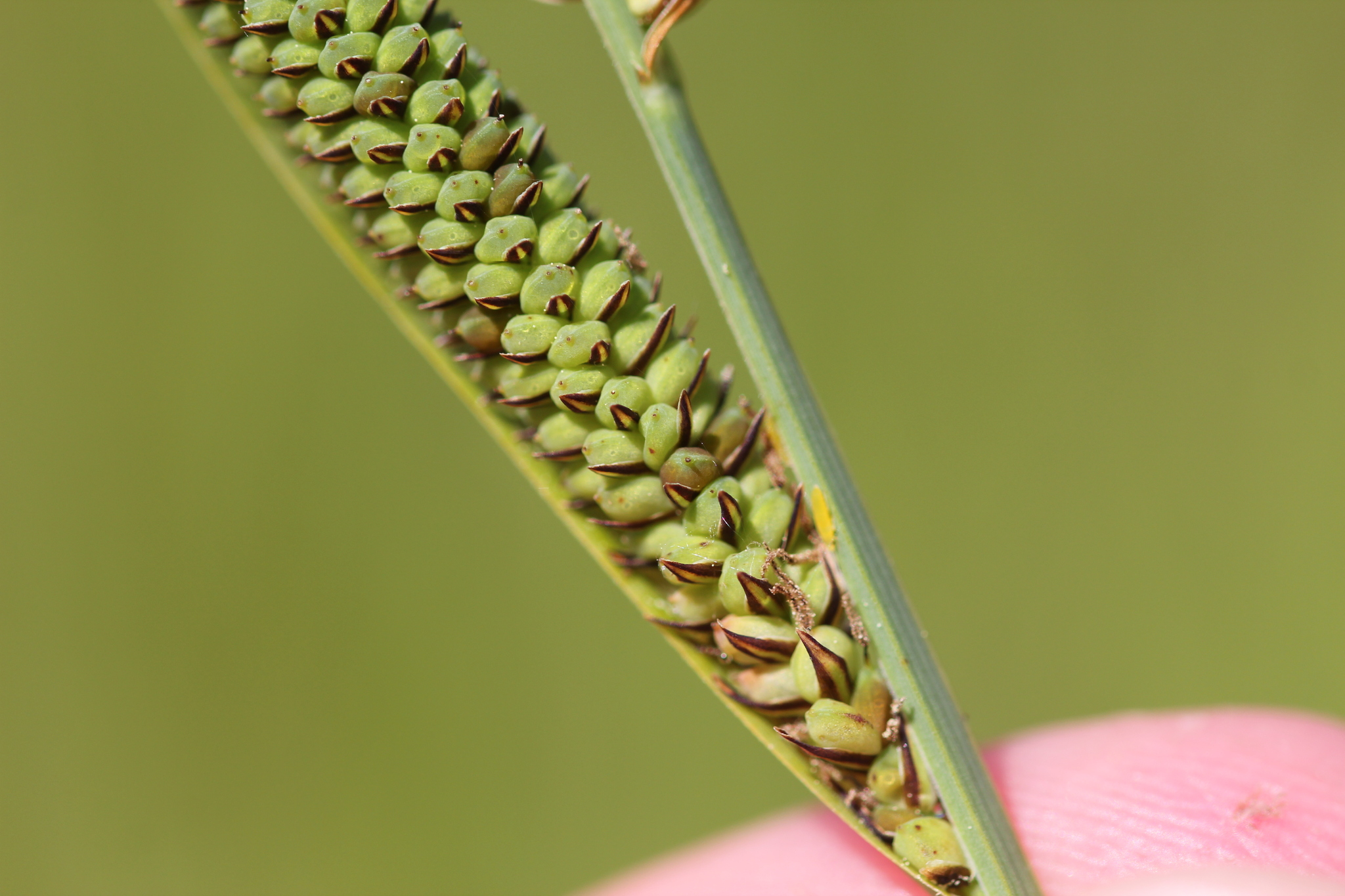

Conservation status
- Least Concern (IUCN 3.1)

Scientific classification
- Kingdom: Plantae
- Clade: Tracheophytes
- Clade: Angiosperms
- Clade: Monocots
- Clade: Commelinids
- Order: Poales
- Family: Cyperaceae
- Genus: Carex
- Species: C. haydenii

Binomial name
- Carex haydenii Dewey

Synonyms
- Carex rousseaui Raymond; Carex stricta var. decora L.H.Bailey; Carex stricta var. haydenii (Dewey) Kük.

= Carex haydenii =

Species of grass-like plant

Carex haydenii (common name, Hayden's sedge), is a species of flowering plant in the family Cyperaceae, native to eastern Canada and the north-central and northeastern United States. Preferring to grow in wet, shady situations, but able to tolerate full sun, it is recommended for rain gardens.
