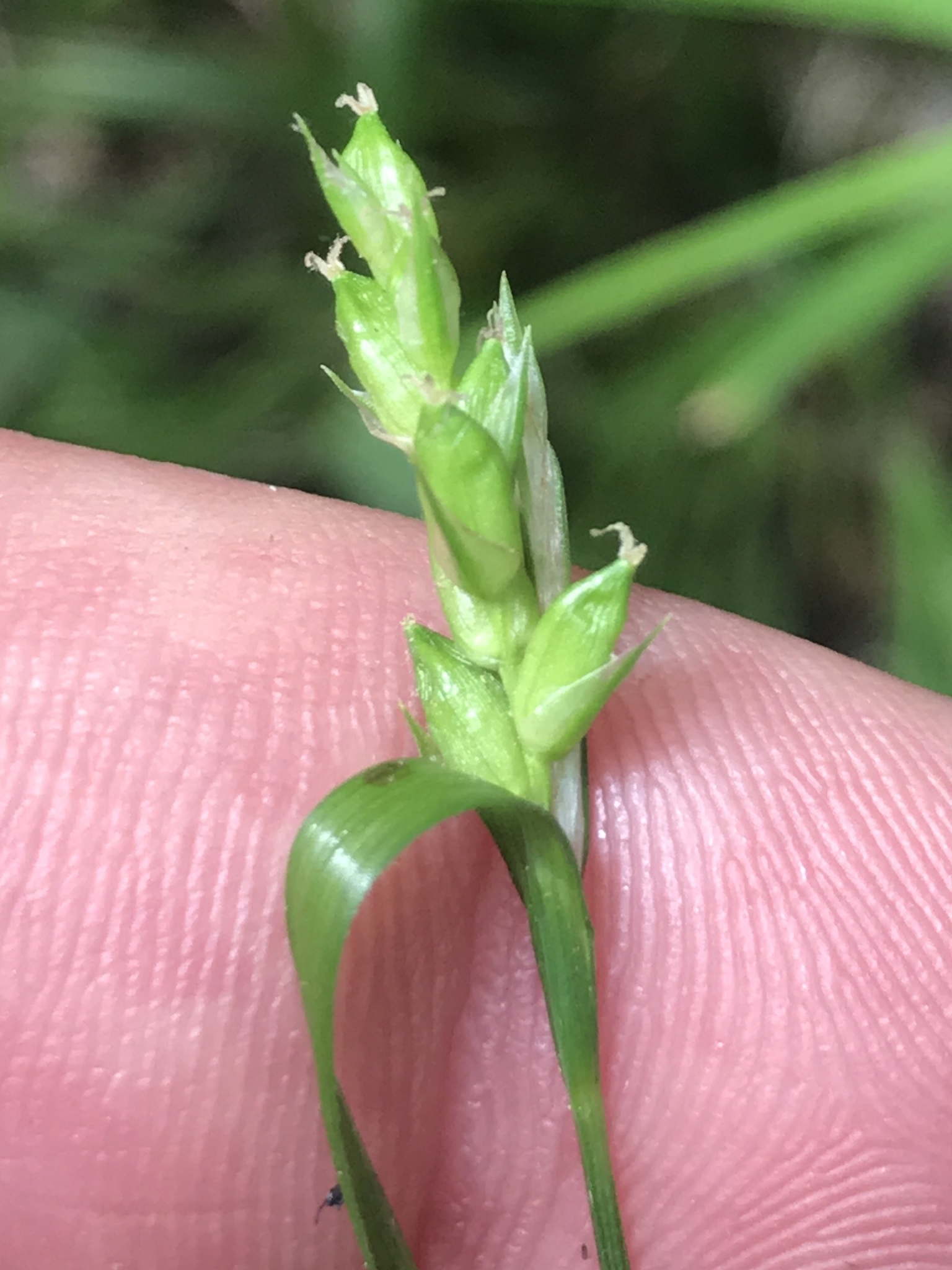
- Closeup of the perigynia

Scientific classification
- Kingdom: Plantae
- Clade: Tracheophytes
- Clade: Angiosperms
- Clade: Monocots
- Clade: Commelinids
- Order: Poales
- Family: Cyperaceae
- Genus: Carex
- Section: Carex sect. Griseae
- Species: C. amphibola

Binomial name
- Carex amphibola Steud.

Synonyms
- Carex grisea var. amphibola (Steud.) Kük.; Carex grisea var. minor Olney; Carex laxiflora Elliott, nom. illeg.

= Carex amphibola =

Species of grass-like plant

Carex amphibola, known as gray sedge, is a species of flowering plant in the family Cyperaceae. It was first formally named in 1855. Carex amphibola is native to the eastern United States and Canada.

Carex amphibola is commonly confused with Carex grisea, which has somewhat greener perigynia with more rounded tips, versus the gray-green coloring and angular tips of C. amphibola perigynia. The perigynia of C. amphibola are somewhat more clustered and spreading at maturity, while those of C. grisea are strongly ascending.

Carex amphibola grows in mesic deciduous forests, often in loamy areas near streams.
