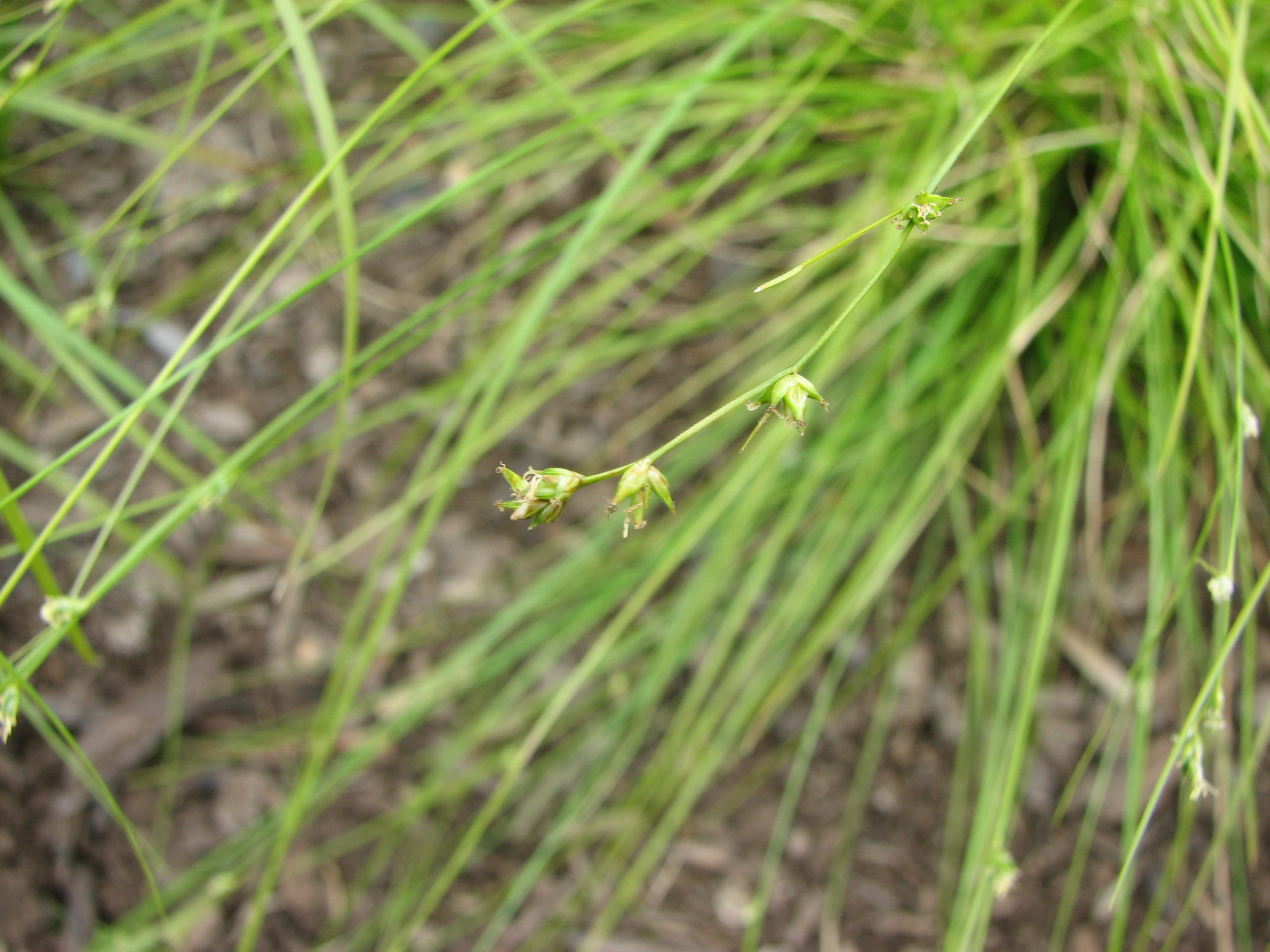
- Fruiting

Conservation status
- Apparently Secure (NatureServe)

Scientific classification
- Kingdom: Plantae
- Clade: Tracheophytes
- Clade: Angiosperms
- Clade: Monocots
- Clade: Commelinids
- Order: Poales
- Family: Cyperaceae
- Genus: Carex
- Species: C. appalachica

Binomial name
- Carex appalachica J.M.Webber & P.W.Ball

= Carex appalachica =

Species of plant

Carex appalachica, the Appalachian sedge, is a species of flowering plant in the family Cyperaceae. It is native to eastern temperate forests of the United States and Canada. The plant is wide-ranging in the northeastern United States and southern Canada while in the southern reaches of their range they are generally restricted to high elevations. A member of the large genus Carex, commonly known as sedges, this species is a member of the Carex rosea complex within the subgenus Vignea.

== Range ==
The species ranges from southern Canada and New England west into Ohio and south down the Appalachians and Ridge and Valley to Georgia and Alabama. Within the northeastern United States this plant is somewhat common, but at the north of their range in Canada the species becomes rarer. In the center and west of their range the sedge is quite common. However, they are rare at the south of their range and thusly listed in the states of Alabama (S1), Tennessee (S1), Georgia (S1?), and South Carolina (S2).

== Ecology ==
This species is mostly known from rocky open woods, rock outcrops, and heath balds in the southeastern United States but favors dry woodlands and slopes farther north. They typically flower and fruit between May and June.
