= Carex shortiana =

- At the University of Copenhagen Botanical Garden
- In Brooklyn Heights

Conservation status
- Secure (NatureServe)

Scientific classification
- Kingdom: Plantae
- Clade: Tracheophytes
- Clade: Angiosperms
- Clade: Monocots
- Clade: Commelinids
- Order: Poales
- Family: Cyperaceae
- Genus: Carex
- Species: C. shortiana

Binomial name
- Carex shortiana Dewey & Torr.

Synonyms
- Carex aporandra Kunze ex Boott; Carex ohiotica Hochst. & Steud.; Carex shortii Torr.

Species of plant

Carex shortiana, called Short's sedge, is a species of flowering plant in the family Cyperaceae. It is native to southern Ontario and parts of the north‑central and eastern United States. A rhizomatous perennial reaching 0.9 m (3 ft), it is typically found in calcareous bottomlands and other wet areas, whether shaded or not.
