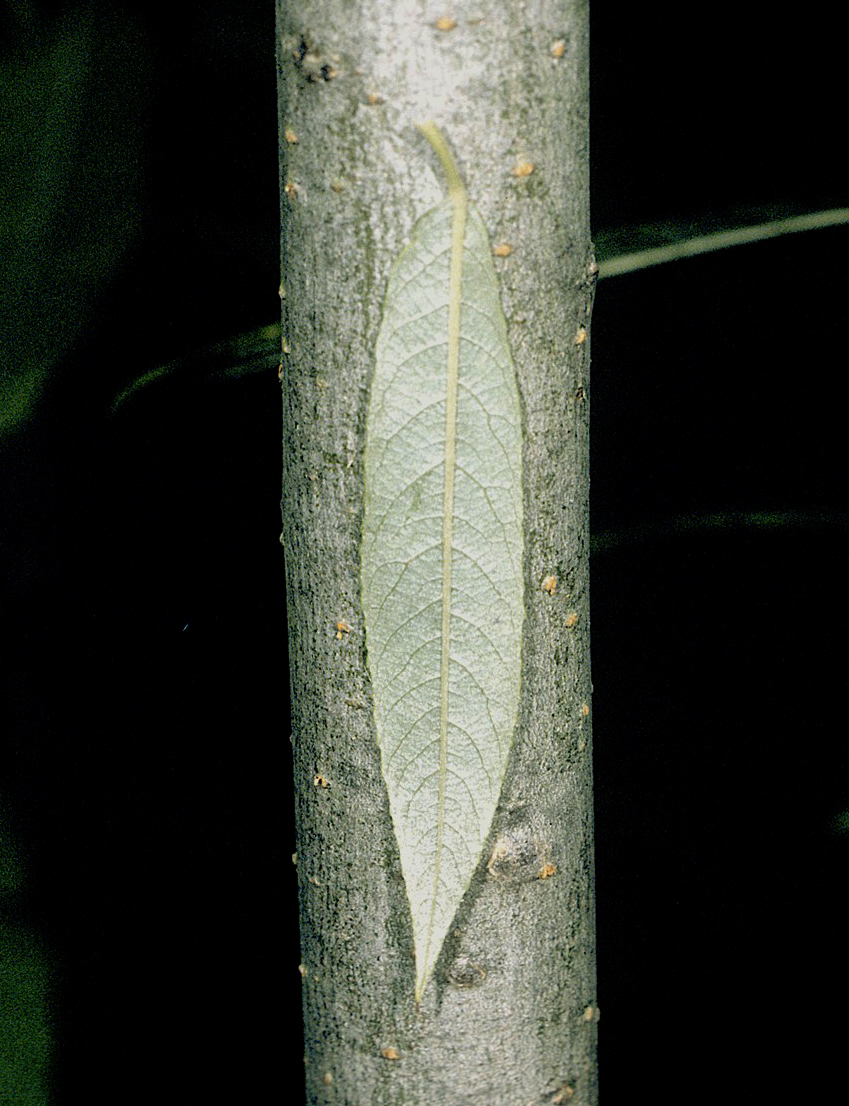
- Bark and underside of leaf

Conservation status
- Least Concern (IUCN 3.1)

Scientific classification
- Kingdom: Plantae
- Clade: Tracheophytes
- Clade: Angiosperms
- Clade: Eudicots
- Clade: Rosids
- Order: Malpighiales
- Family: Salicaceae
- Genus: Salix
- Species: S. sericea

Binomial name
- Salix sericea Marsh.
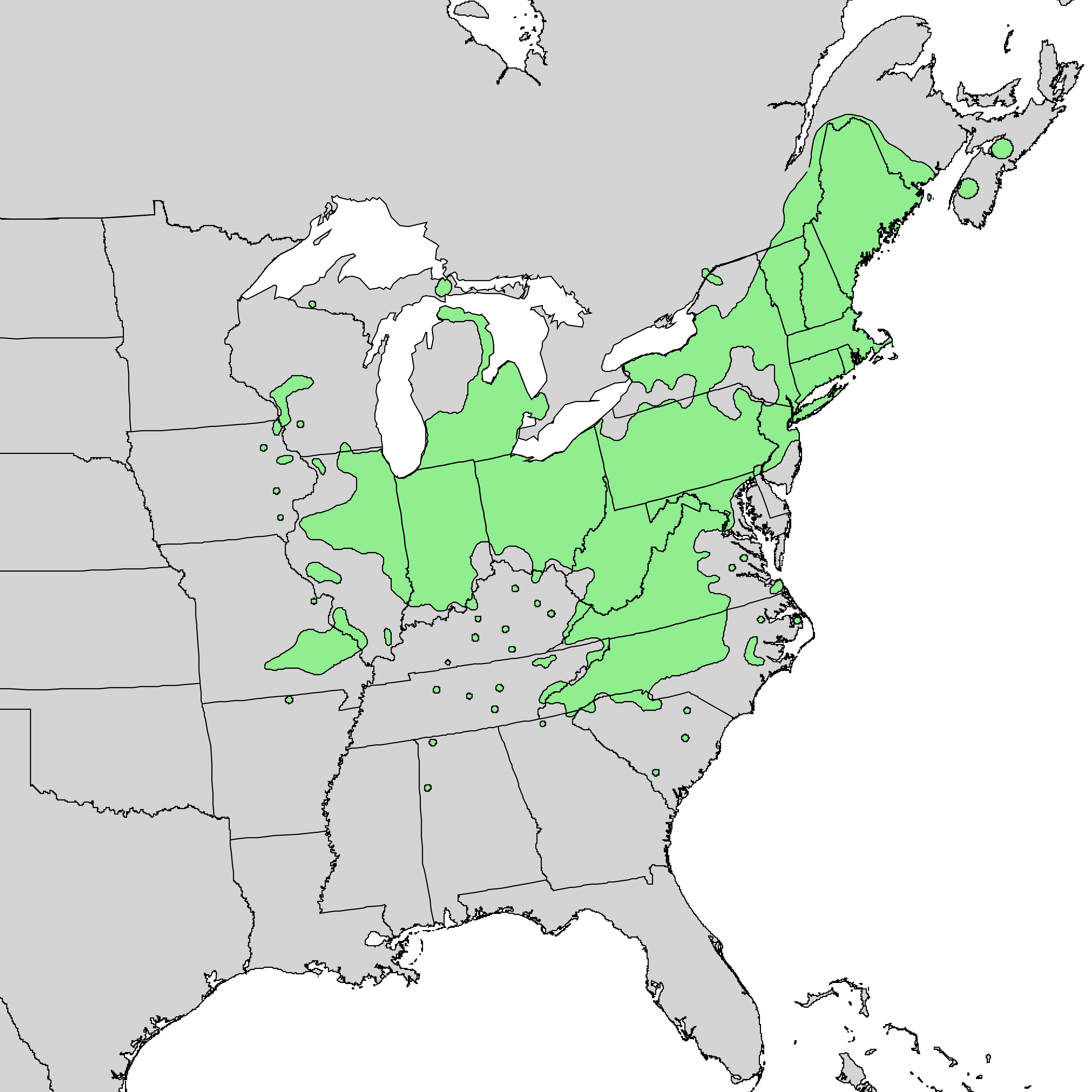
- Natural range of Salix sericea

= Salix sericea =

Species of willow

Salix sericea, commonly known as silky willow, is a shrub in the Salicaceae family that grows in swamps and along rivers in eastern United States and Canada. It is 2 to 4 m (6.6 to 13.1 ft) tall and has long, thin, purplish twigs. The leaves are 6–10 cm long, 7–8 mm wide, lanceolate, acuminate, serrulate, dark green and lightly hairy on top, and light green and densely covered with white silky hairs underneath. Mature leaves are glabrous. The petioles are 1 cm long. Catkins are sessile and usually bracteate. S. sericea blooms in May and fruits in June.
