= Viola appalachiensis =

Conservation status
- Apparently Secure (NatureServe)

Scientific classification
- Kingdom: Plantae
- Clade: Embryophytes
- Clade: Tracheophytes
- Clade: Angiosperms
- Clade: Eudicots
- Clade: Rosids
- Order: Malpighiales
- Family: Violaceae
- Genus: Viola
- Species: V. appalachiensis

Binomial name
- Viola appalachiensis L.K.Henry 1953

Synonyms
- Viola allegheniensis L.K. Henry 1953, illegitimate homonym not Roem. & Schult. 1819; Viola walteri var. appalachiensis (L.K. Henry) L.E. McKinney

Species of flowering plant

Viola appalachiensis, the Appalachian blue violet, also known as Appalachian violet and Henry's violet, is a Viola native to the Appalachian Mountains in the Eastern United States.

== Distribution ==
The native Viola appalachiensis habitats includes rich moist woods, mountain coves, stream banks, sometimes in mowed areas such as forest roads. Its range is from Pennsylvania to North Carolina in the Appalachian Mountains. It is very rare. Some authors consider this to be the same species as V. walteri, but others argue for its recognition as a distinct species.

== Description ==
This is a herbaceous plant, it is a perennial and is an evergreen which can reach 10 cm in height (4 inches). New stems ascending at first, soon become prostrate, mat forming, rooting from the nodes, mostly hairless.

The leaves are alternate. Sometimes appearing to be stemless. Each leaf is kidney-shaped, very slightly toothed or crenate and with a few hairs near the margin. Stipules lacerate.

The flowers are irregular in shape. They are blue with white center. Blooms first appear in mid spring and continue into late spring. Spur much longer than wide. Lateral petals bearded.
