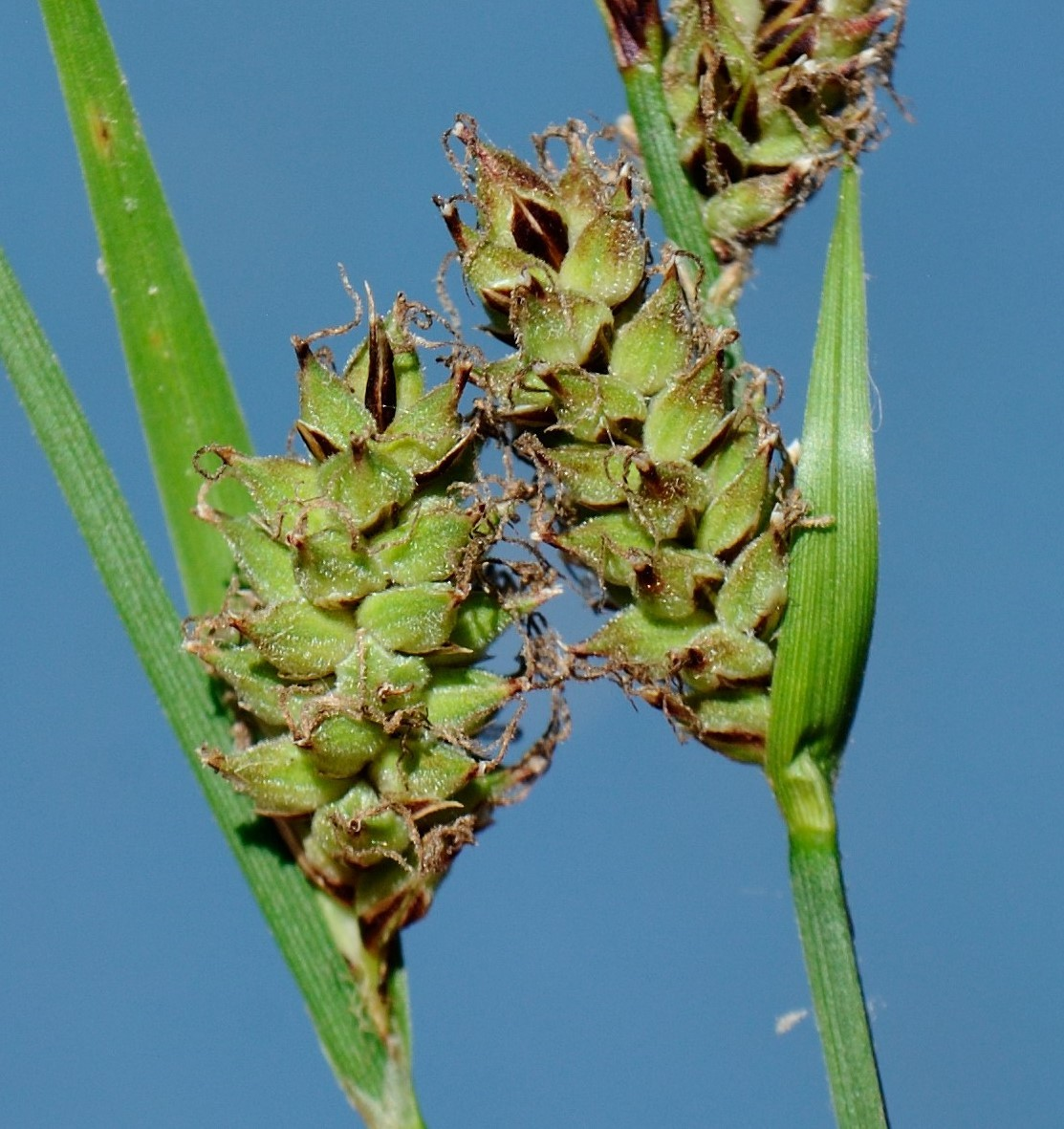

Scientific classification
- Kingdom: Plantae
- Clade: Embryophytes
- Clade: Tracheophytes
- Clade: Spermatophytes
- Clade: Angiosperms
- Clade: Monocots
- Clade: Commelinids
- Order: Poales
- Family: Cyperaceae
- Genus: Carex
- Species: C. vestita

Binomial name
- Carex vestita Willd.

= Carex vestita =

Velvet sedge

Species of plant

Carex vestita, also commonly known as velvet sedge, is a tussock-forming species of perennial sedge in the family Cyperaceae. It is native to eastern parts of the United States.

== Description ==
The sedge has long creeping rhizomes and forms large colonies. It has lateral culms with a triangular cross-section that have a length of 25 to 90 cm (9.8 to 35.4 in). There are reddish to purple coloured basal sheaths under the leaves. The leaves meet the stem forming a 1.2 to 9 mm (0.047 to 0.354 in) a membranous scale, or ligule, on the inner side of the leaf sheath. The glabrous leaves are green and have an M-shape with a width of 2.2 to 5.5 mm (0.087 to 0.217 in).

== Taxonomy ==
The species was first formally described by the botanist Carl Ludwig Willdenow in 1805 as a part of the work Species Plantarum. It has one synonym; Loxotrema vestita.

== Distribution ==
C. vestita is mostly found growing in temperate biomes down in the eastern states of the United States. It is found from Maine in the north east the south to Alabama in the south west and North Carolina in the south east.

== See also ==
- List of Carex species
