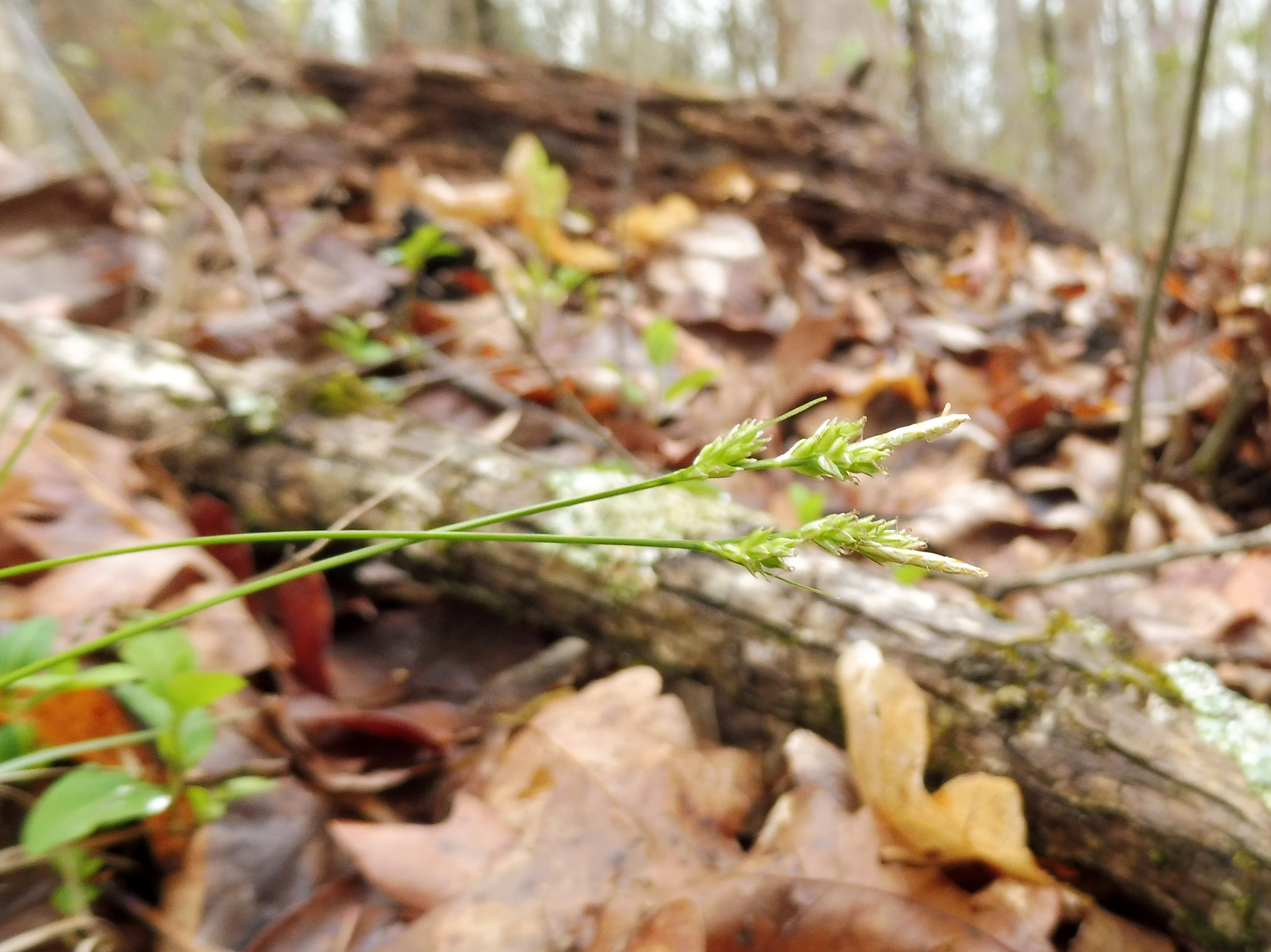

Scientific classification
- Kingdom: Plantae
- Clade: Tracheophytes
- Clade: Angiosperms
- Clade: Monocots
- Clade: Commelinids
- Order: Poales
- Family: Cyperaceae
- Genus: Carex
- Subgenus: Carex subg. Carex
- Section: Carex sect. Acrocystis
- Species: C. albicans

Binomial name
- Carex albicans Willd. ex Spreng.

= Carex albicans =

Species of grass-like plant

Carex albicans, commonly called whitetinge sedge, is a species of flowering plant in the sedge family (Cyperaceae). It is native to the eastern North America, where it is found in Canada and the United States. Its typical natural habitat is dry forests and woodlands.

Carex albicans is a perennial graminoid. It produces fruits in early spring, which are dispersed in part by ants.

Carex section Acrocystis is known for being taxonomically difficult, with new species still being described in eastern North America. Two species in this section, Carex emmonsii and Carex physorhyncha, have historically been treated as varieties of Carex albicans due to the three taxa's strong morphological and biochemical similarities. However, modern treatments of the 2010s often separate them at the species level.
