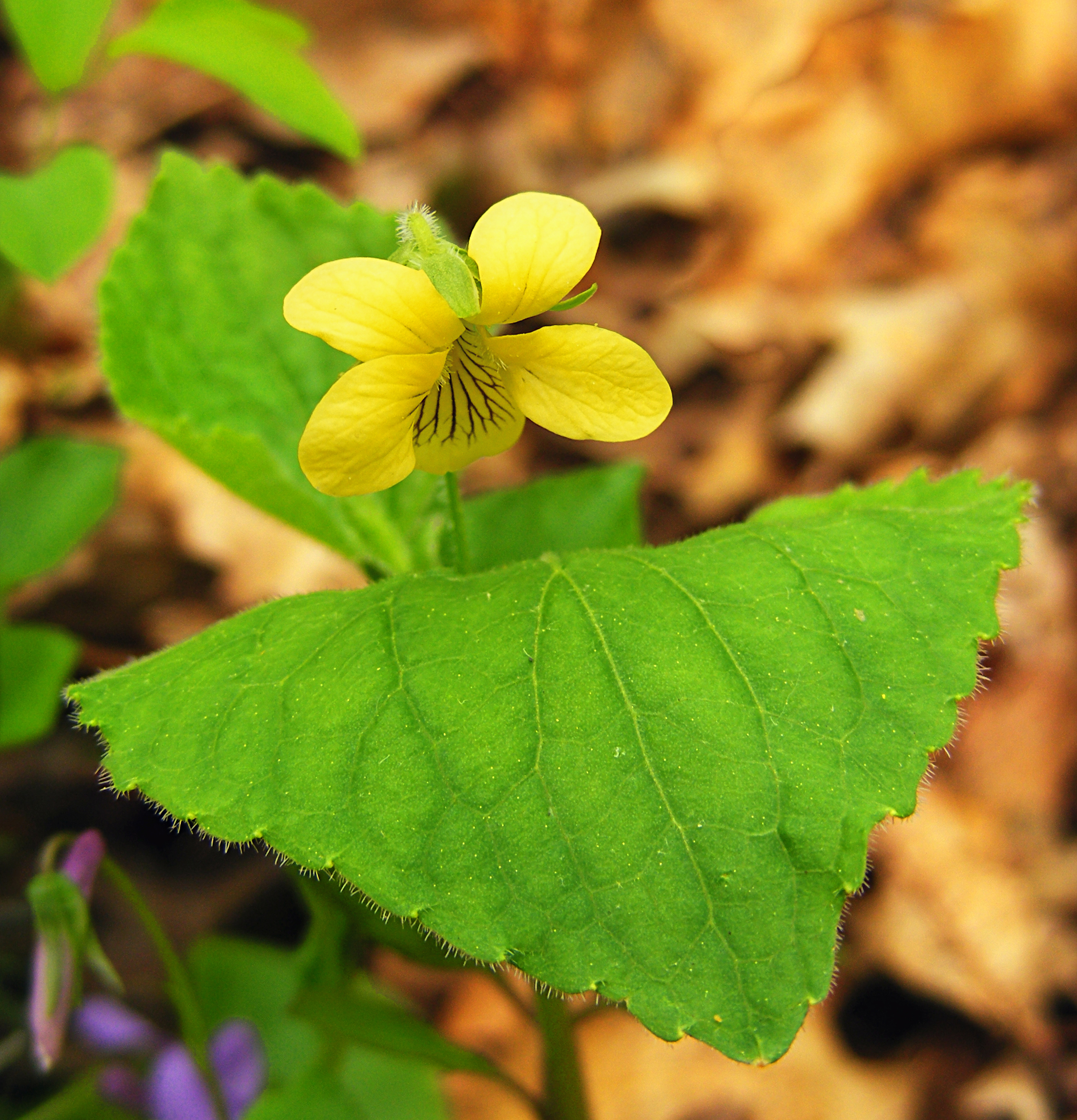

Conservation status
- Secure (NatureServe)

Scientific classification
- Kingdom: Plantae
- Clade: Tracheophytes
- Clade: Angiosperms
- Clade: Eudicots
- Clade: Rosids
- Order: Malpighiales
- Family: Violaceae
- Genus: Viola
- Species: V. pubescens

Binomial name
- Viola pubescens Aiton

= Viola pubescens =

Downy yellow violet

Species of flowering plant

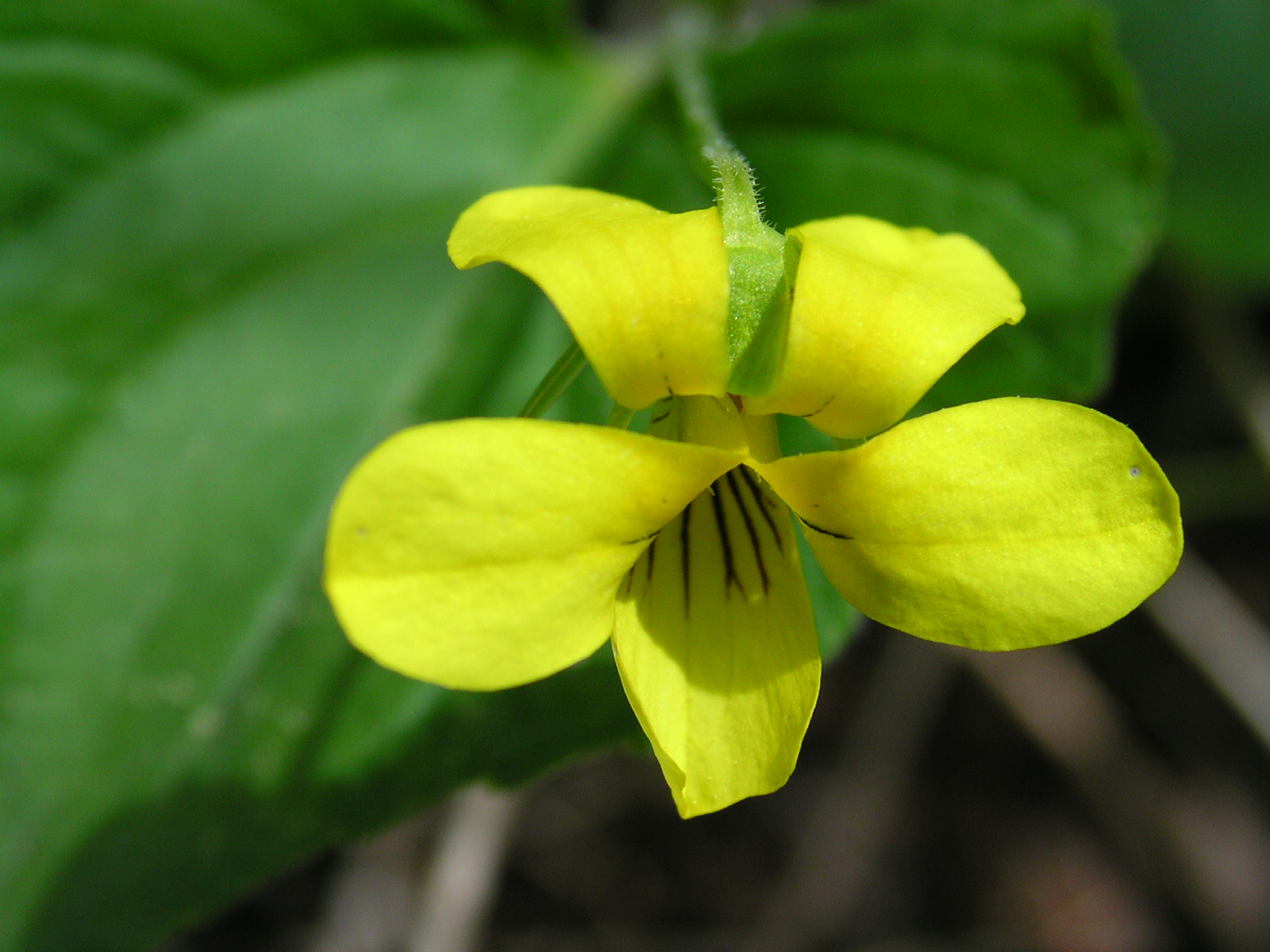
Closeup of flower

Viola pubescens, commonly called the downy yellow violet, is a plant species of the genus Viola and is classified within the subsection Nudicaules of section Chamaemelanium. It is a widespread North American violet found in rich, mesic woodlands, and sometimes in meadows, from Minnesota and Ontario east to Nova Scotia and south to Virginia. V. pubescens produces two different types of flowers during the season, including chasmogamous flowers in the early spring and cleistogamous flowers summer through fall.

Similar-looking species include the round-leaved yellow violet (Viola rotundifolia). The two species can be differentiated by leaf shape and leaf margin. Additionally, V. pubescens has both basal and cauline leaves, while V. rotundifolia has only basal leaves.
