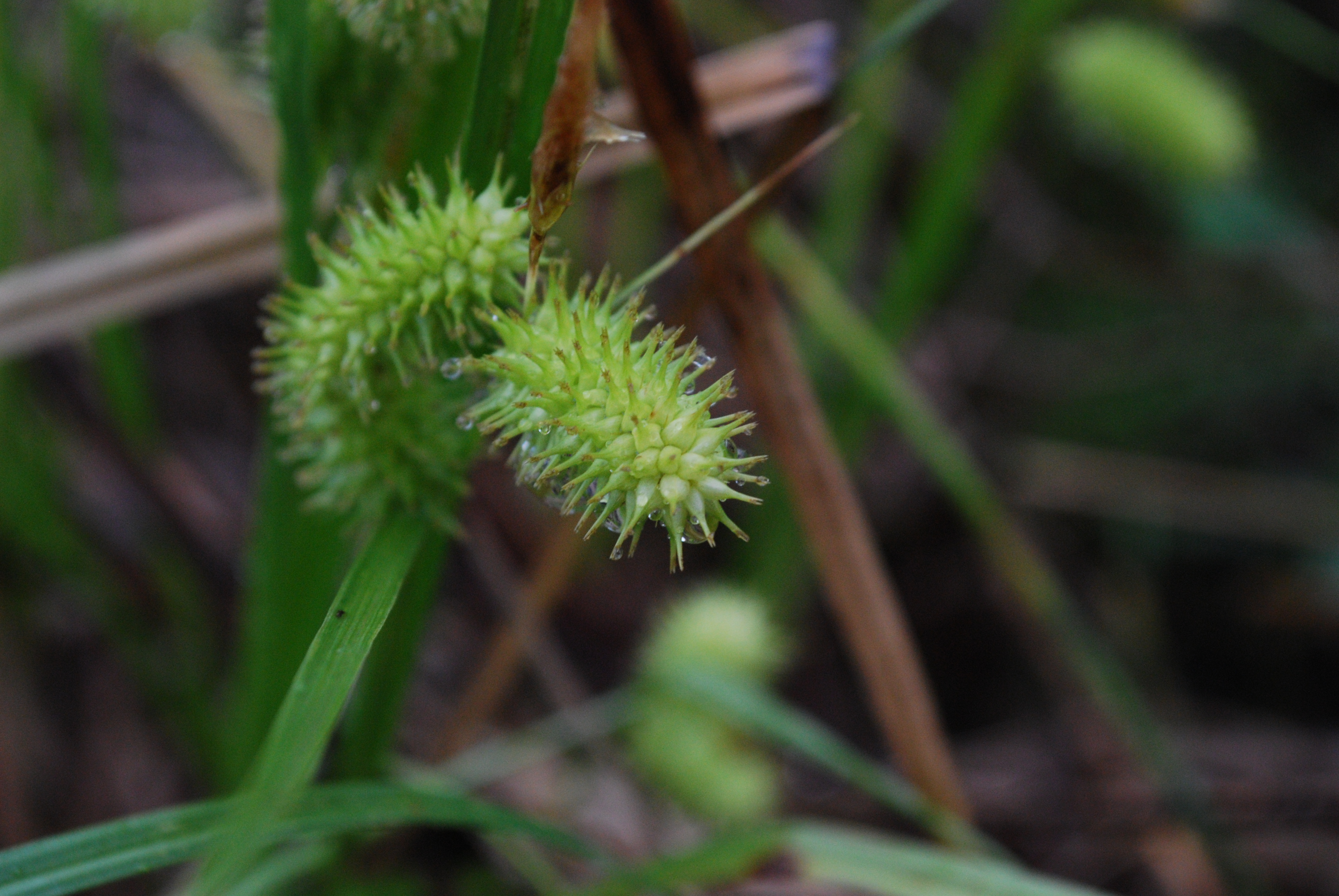

Conservation status
- Least Concern (IUCN 3.1)

Scientific classification
- Kingdom: Plantae
- Clade: Tracheophytes
- Clade: Angiosperms
- Clade: Monocots
- Clade: Commelinids
- Order: Poales
- Family: Cyperaceae
- Genus: Carex
- Species: C. lurida

Binomial name
- Carex lurida Wahlenb.

Synonyms
- List: Carex beyrichiana Boeckeler; Carex lupulina var. polystachya Schwein. & Torr.; Carex lurida var. altior Peck; Carex lurida var. exudans L.H.Bailey ex Britton & A.Br.; Carex lurida var. flaccida L.H.Bailey; Carex lurida f. parvula (Paine) D.S.Carp.; Carex lurida var. parvula (Paine) L.H.Bailey.; Carex lurida var. polystachya (Schwein. & Torr.) L.H.Bailey; Carex purshii Olney; Carex rostrata Muhl. ex Willd.; Carex tentaculata Muhl. ex Willd.; Carex tentaculata var. altior Boott; Carex tentaculata var. flaccida (L.H.Bailey) Howe; Carex tentaculata var. parvula Paine; Carex tentaculata var. rostrata Pursh

= Carex lurida =

Species of grass-like plant

Carex lurida is a tussock-forming flowering plant of the family Cyperaceae, the sedge family. Common names for Carex lurida include shallow sedge, sallow sedge and lurid sedge.

== Description ==
Carex lurida is a clump-forming plant with a tuft of basal leaves and culms growing up to 90 cm in height. Leaves are a bright yellow-green colour, growing to about half the length of the stem. The inflorescence takes the form of large brush-shaped spikes, lime green in colour, turning golden brown as they ripen. The root system is rhizomatous, with fibrous roots.

== Distribution and habitat ==
Carex lurida is a wetland plant, preferring marshy conditions such as sedge meadows, swamps and ditches. Its native range is Eastern Canada to Ecuador, and it has also been introduced to New Zealand.
