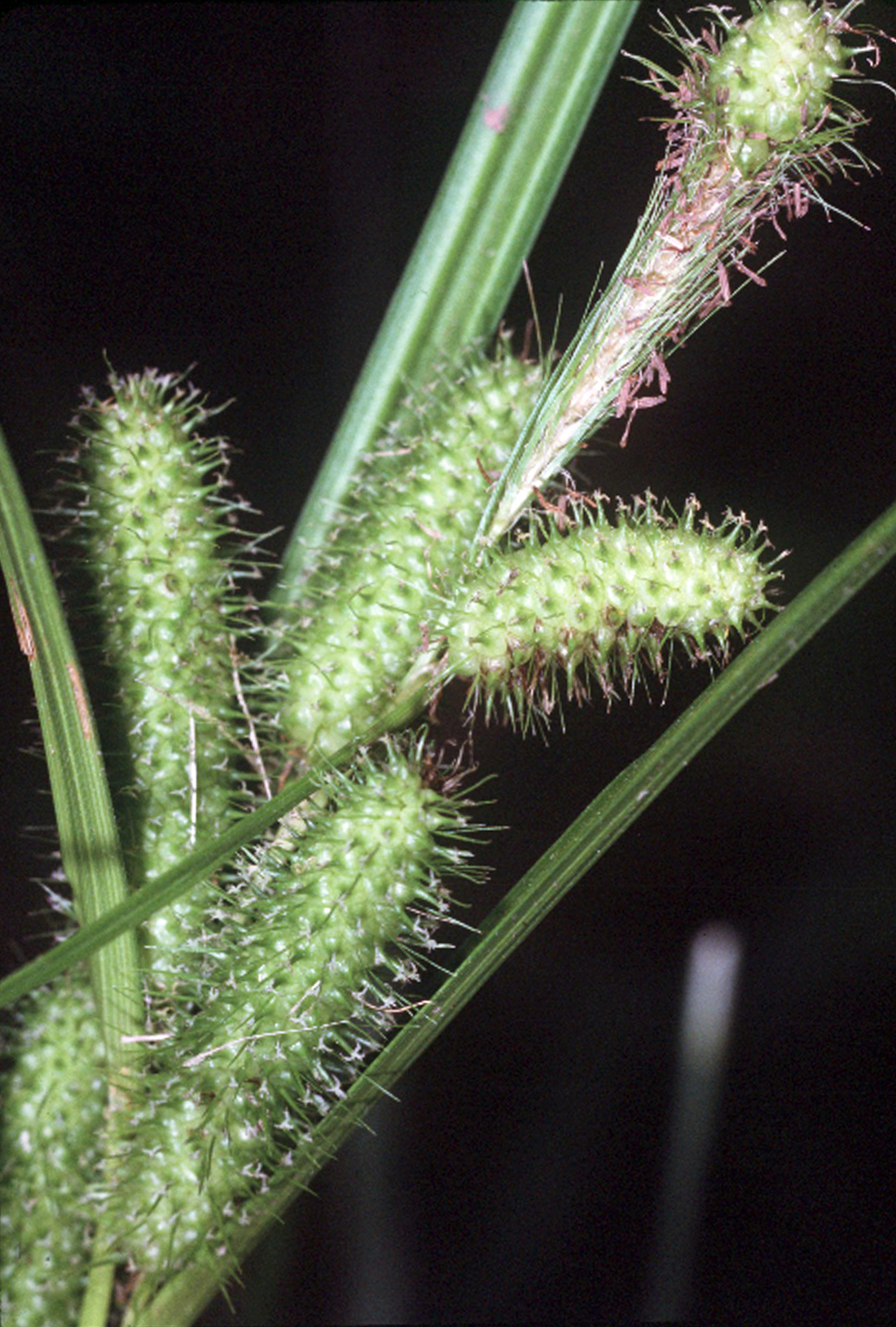
- Inflorescences

Scientific classification
- Kingdom: Plantae
- Clade: Tracheophytes
- Clade: Angiosperms
- Clade: Monocots
- Clade: Commelinids
- Order: Poales
- Family: Cyperaceae
- Genus: Carex
- Species: C. frankii

Binomial name
- Carex frankii Kunth

Synonyms
- Carex shortii Steud.; Carex stenolepis Torr.; Carex stenolepis f. gracilior Kük.

= Carex frankii =

Species of grass-like plant

Carex frankii, Frank's sedge, is a widespread species of flowering plant in the family Cyperaceae, native to temperate eastern North America; Ontario, the central and eastern United States, and Coahuila, Mexico. Preferring to grow in wet, shady situations such as the edges of streams and ponds, and erosion resistant, it is recommended for rain gardens.
