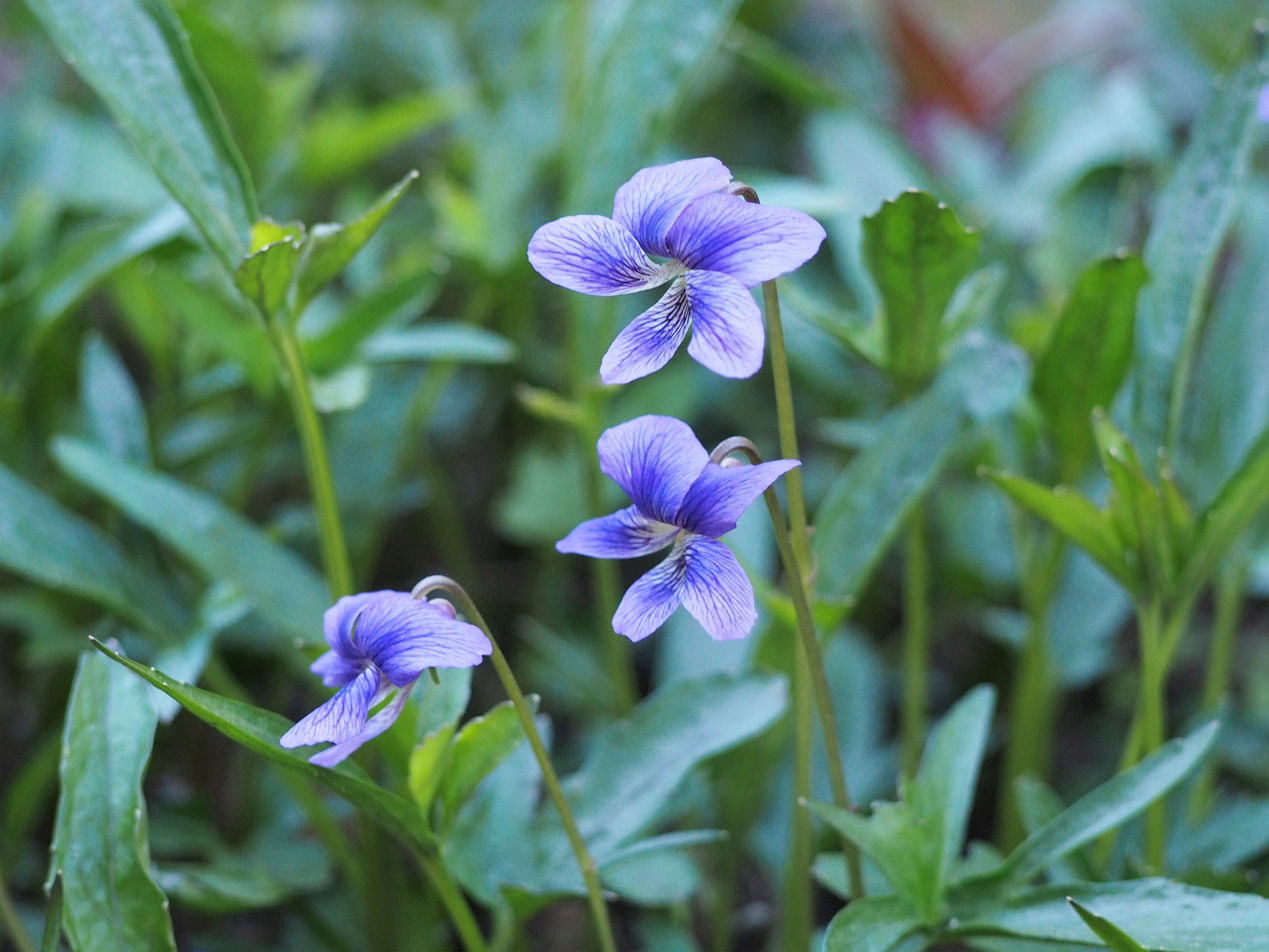
- At the University of Wrocław Botanical Garden
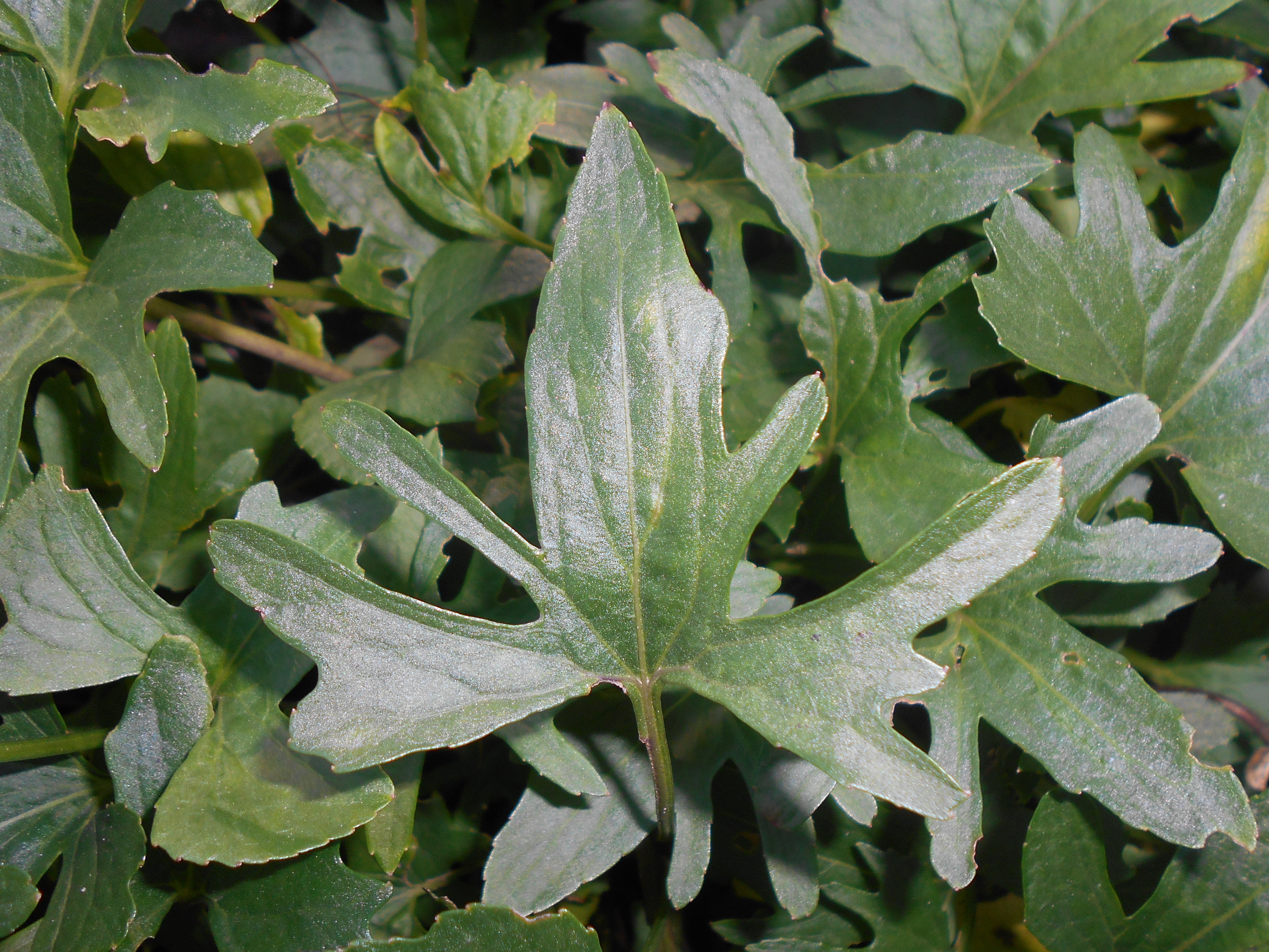
- Close-up of leaf

Scientific classification
- Kingdom: Plantae
- Clade: Embryophytes
- Clade: Tracheophytes
- Clade: Spermatophytes
- Clade: Angiosperms
- Clade: Eudicots
- Clade: Rosids
- Order: Malpighiales
- Family: Violaceae
- Genus: Viola
- Species: V. palmata

Binomial name
- Viola palmata L.

Synonyms
- List: Viola congener Leconte; Viola cucullata var. congener (Leconte) Torr. & A.Gray; Viola cucullata var. palmata (L.) A.Gray; Viola falcata Greene; Viola ornithodes Greene; Viola palmata f. albiflora E.L.Rand & Redfield; Viola palmata var. asarifolia House; Viola palmata var. dilatata Elliott; Viola palmata var. fragrans Elliott; Viola palmata var. obliqua Hitchc.; Viola palmata f. striata O.R.Willis; Viola palmata var. triloba (Schwein.) Ging.; Viola palmata var. variegata Stowell; Viola palmata f. variegata (Stowell) E.L.Rand & Redfield; Viola palmata var. vulgaris Elliott; Viola triloba Schwein.; Viola triloba f. albida Steyerm.; Viola triloba f. annjoae Creutz; Viola triloba var. dilatata (Elliott) Brainerd; Viola triloba f. dilatata (Elliott) E.J.Palmer & Steyerm.; Viola vespertilionis Greene

= Viola palmata =

Species of plant

Viola palmata, the trilobed violet, early blue violet, or wood violet (names it shares with other members of its genus), is a species of flowering plant in the family Violaceae. Viola palmata is native to southeastern Canada as well as the eastern half of the United States. V. palmata is a member of a class familiarly known as "blue stemless violets", characterized by its cleistogamous flowers on short prostrate peduncles, and often concealed under dead leaves or soil.

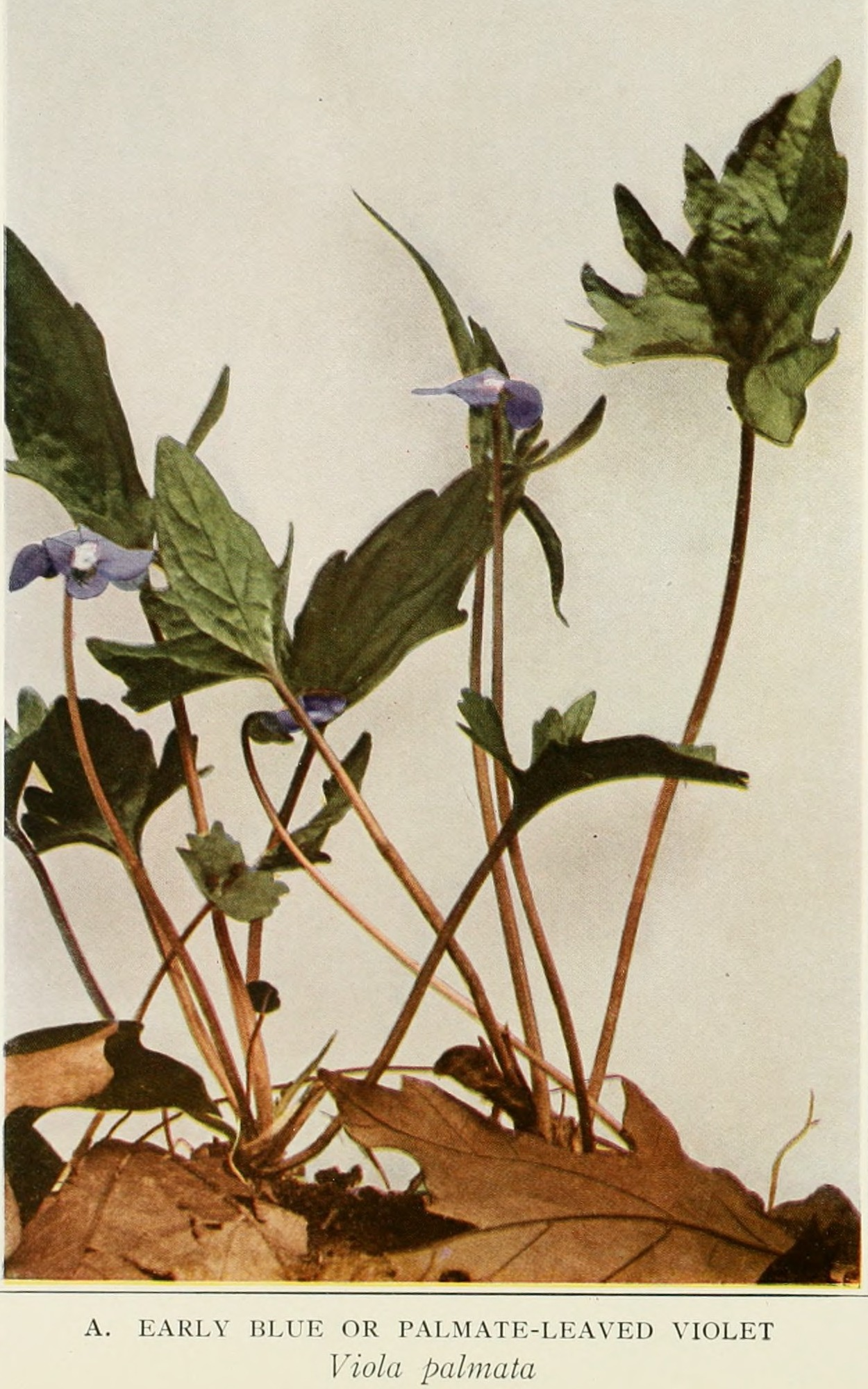
Here given as palmate-leaved violet

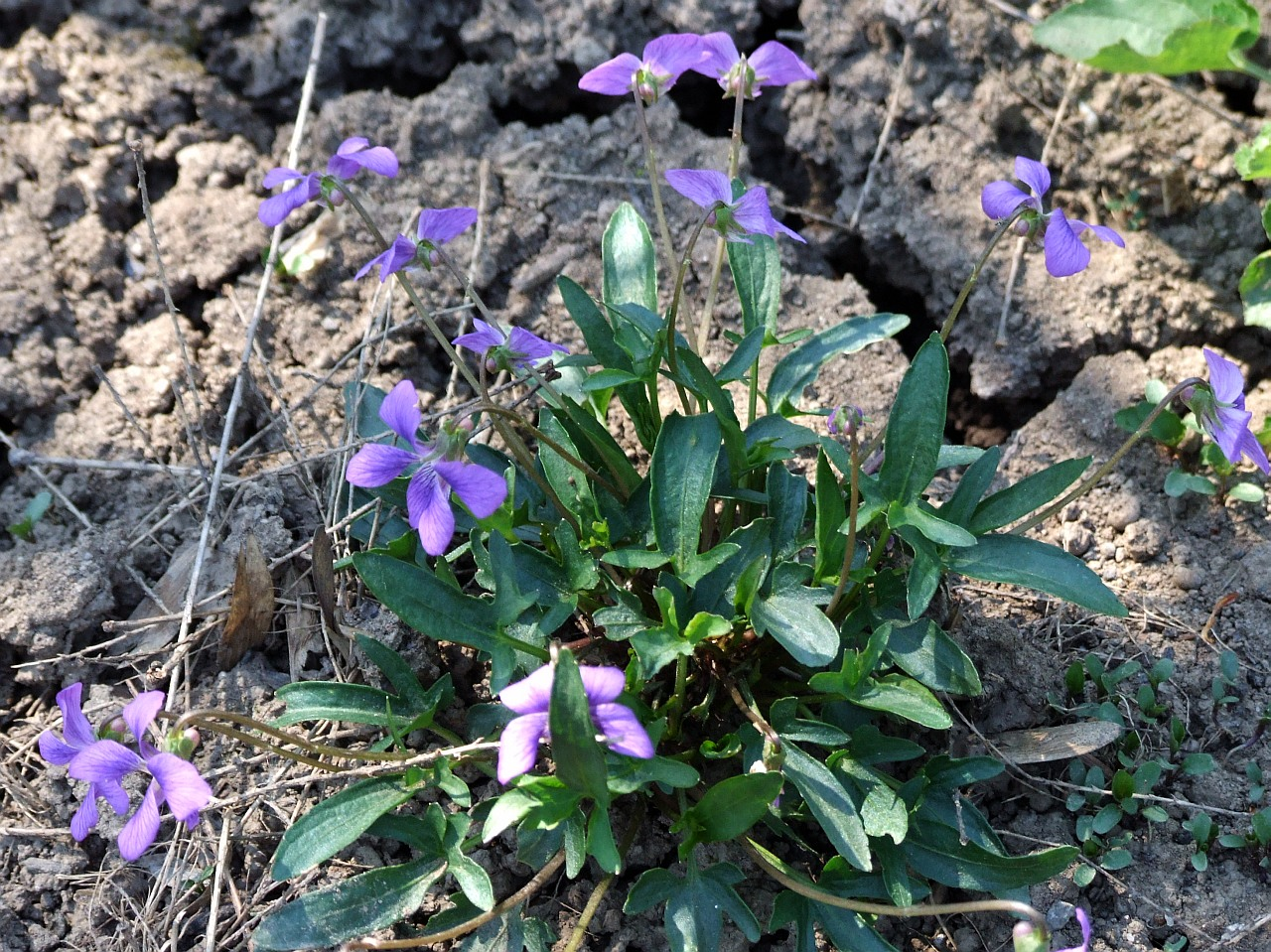
Habit

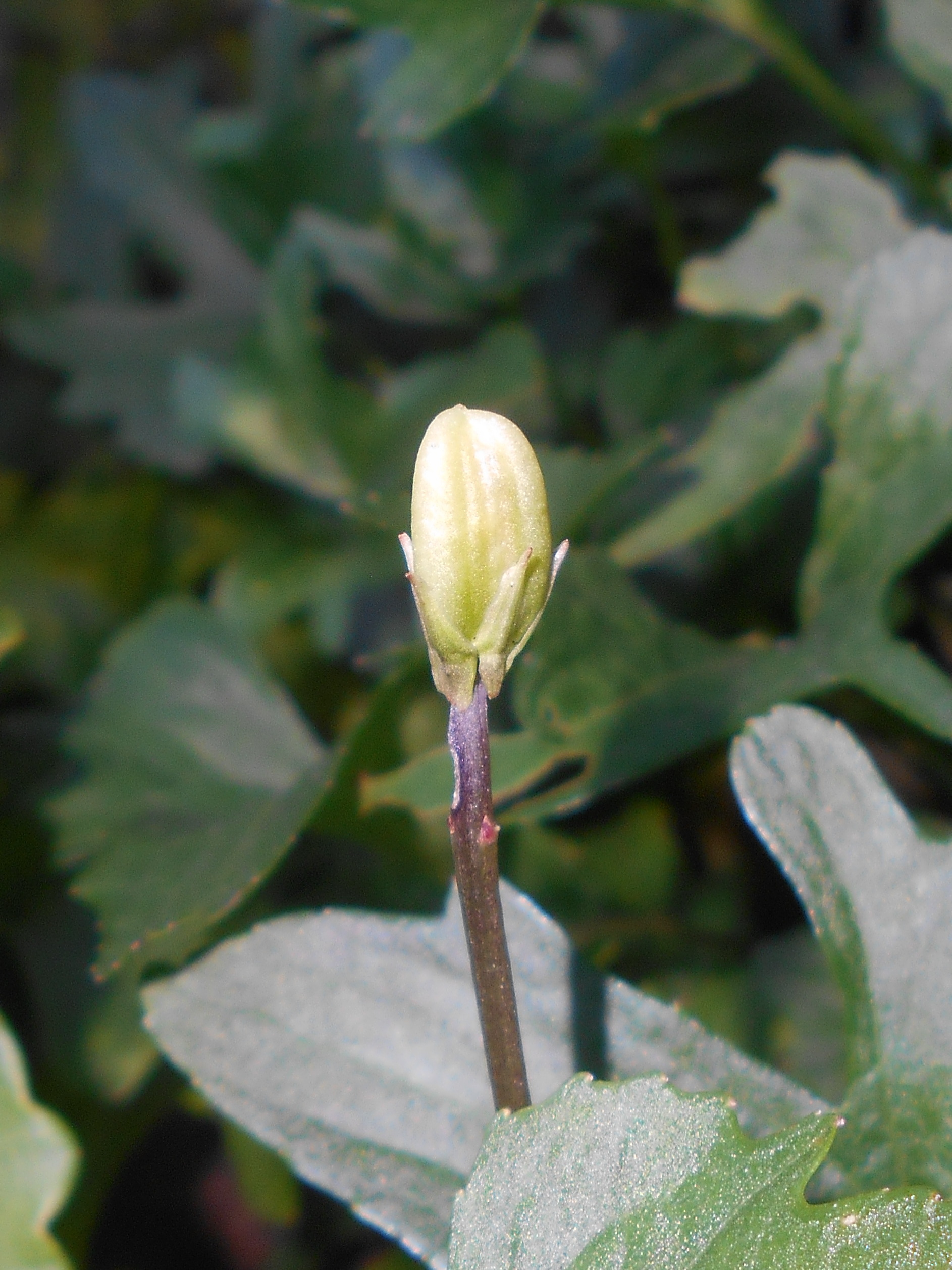
Flower bud

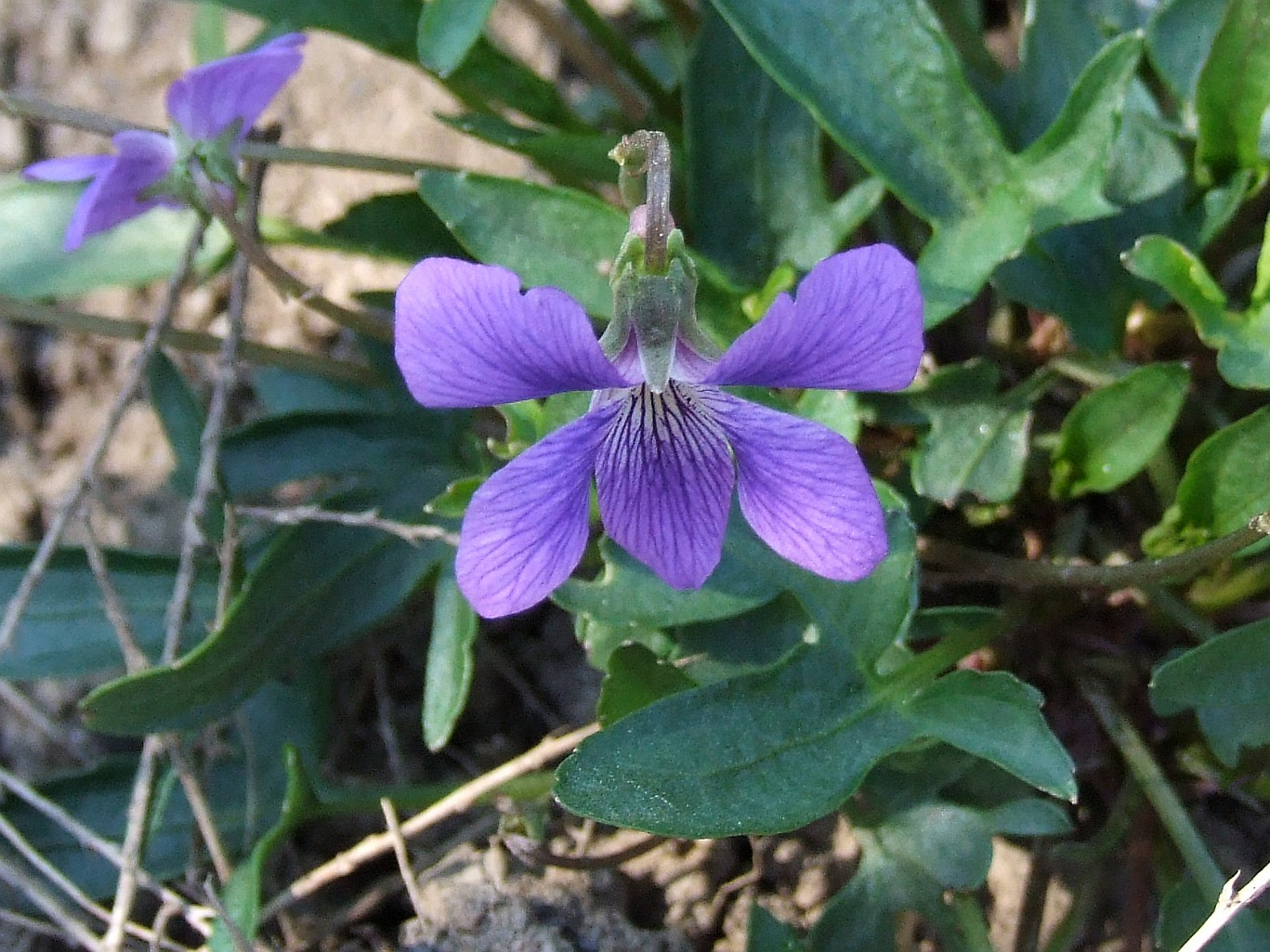
Frontal close-up of flower

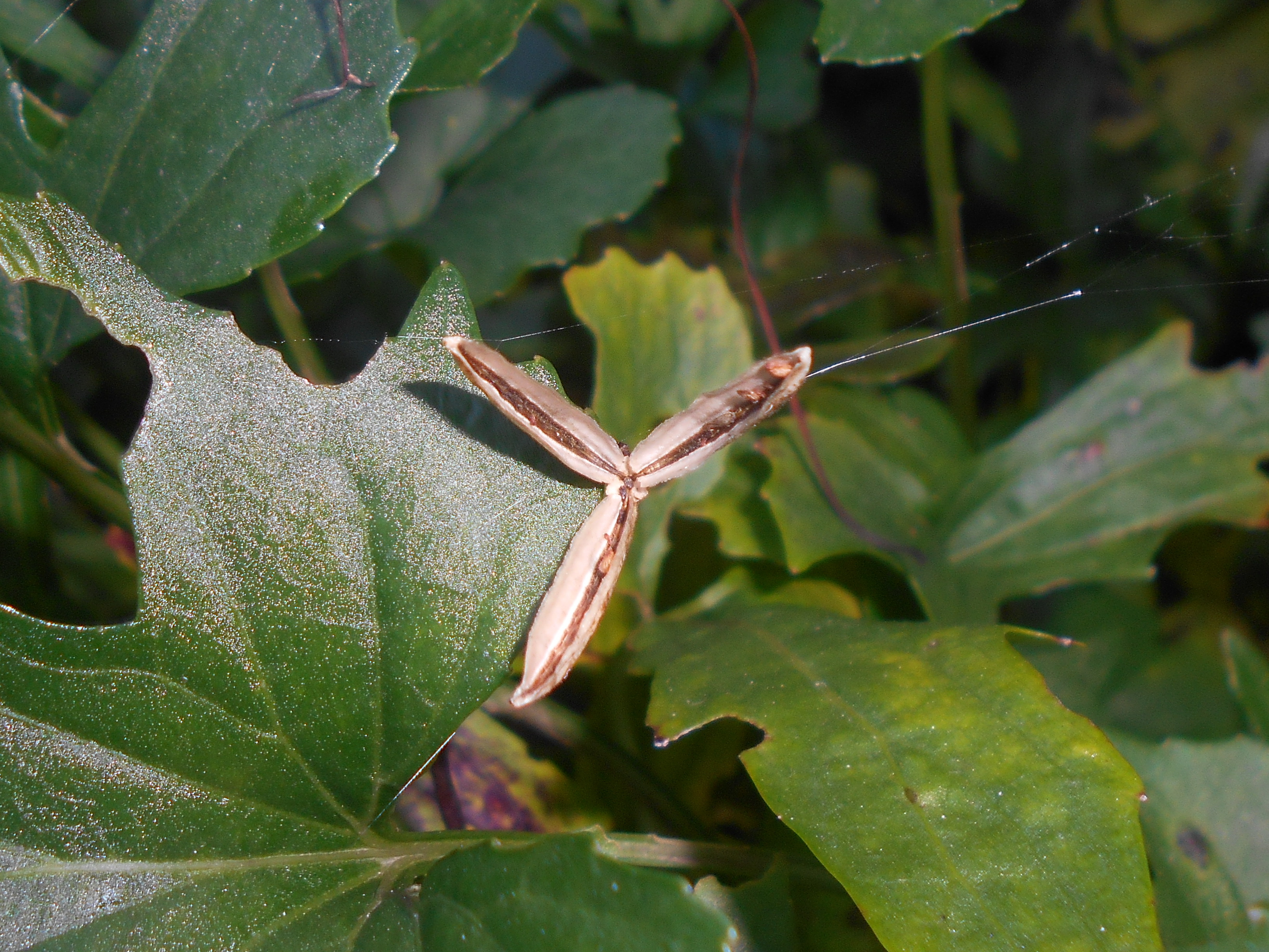
Empty seed capsule
