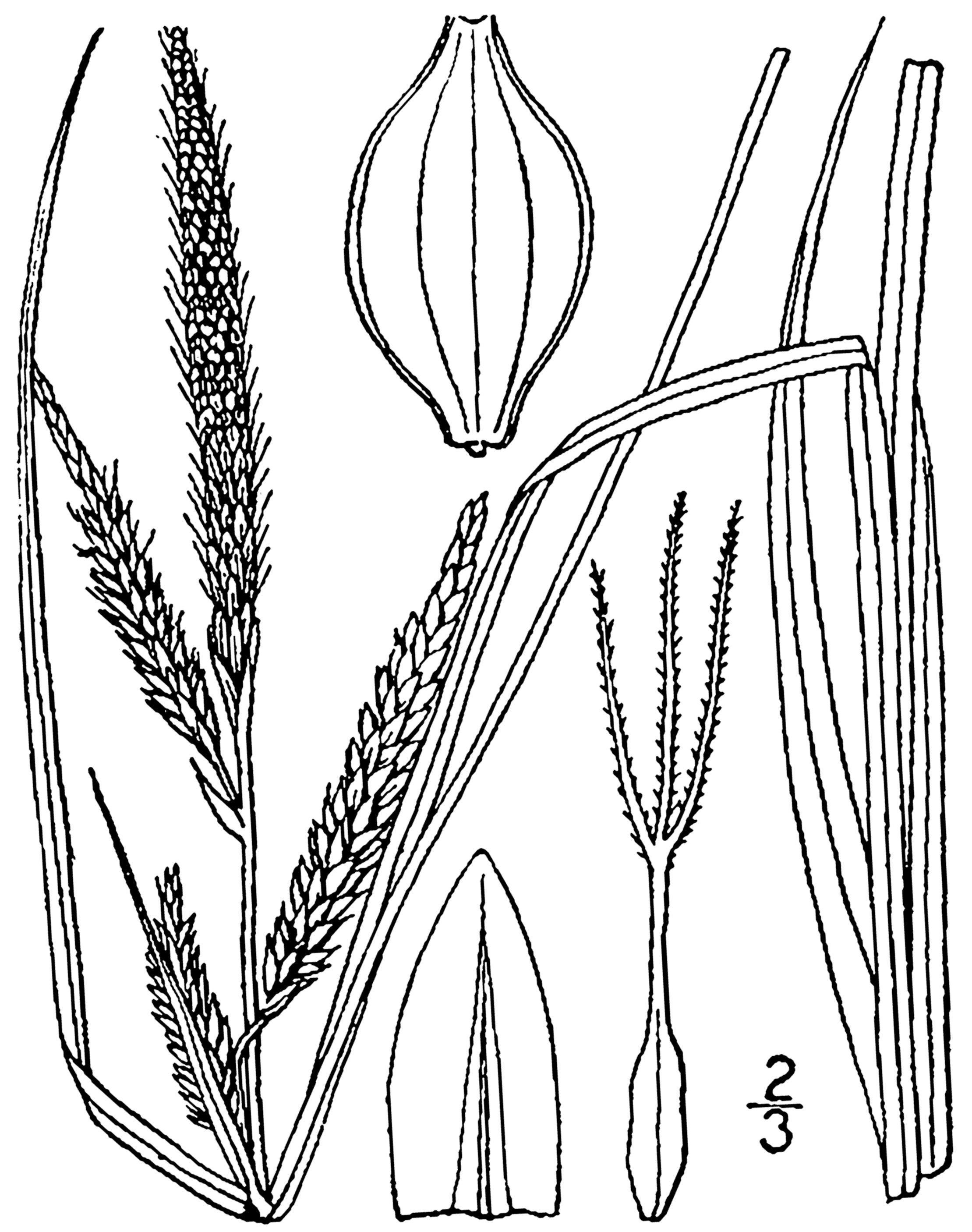

Scientific classification
- Kingdom: Plantae
- Clade: Tracheophytes
- Clade: Angiosperms
- Clade: Monocots
- Clade: Commelinids
- Order: Poales
- Family: Cyperaceae
- Genus: Carex
- Section: Carex sect. Limosae
- Species: C. barrattii

Binomial name
- Carex barrattii Schwein. & Torr.

= Carex barrattii =

Species of sedge

Carex barrattii is a species of sedge known as Barratt's sedge. It is endemic to the United States, where it occurs on the Atlantic Coastal Plain from Connecticut south to Georgia and Alabama. It also occurs in the southern Appalachians.

This sedge has stems growing 20 to 90 centimeters tall. The leaves are a few millimeters wide and pale blue-green in color. The plant produces dark purple flower spikes, but flowering occurs rarely. The plant reproduces vegetatively via rhizome.

This plant grows on wet streambanks and savannas, and in pine barrens. It is not uncommon in the Pine Barrens of New Jersey. Most of the known populations occur there. It is most often found in open, sunny areas on acidic soils. Associated plants include Acer rubrum, Chamaedaphne calyculata, Clethra alnifolia, Sphagnum sp., Spiraea tomentosa, Vaccinium corymbosum, Carex stricta, Carex vesicaria, and Scirpus cyperinus.

This plant requires disturbance, such as wildfire, and it is found in habitat that is fire-dependent, such as pine barrens. It does not tolerate shade.
