= Biodiversity of Westchester County, New York =

Westchester County, New York is located in southern New York, sharing its southern boundary with New York City and its northern border with Putnam County. It is bordered on the west side by the Hudson River and on the east side by the Long Island Sound and Fairfield County, Connecticut. The county has a total area of 500 square miles (1,300 km^{2}), of which 430 square miles (1,100 km^{2}) is land and 69 square miles (180 km^{2}) (14%) is water. It is an area rich in biodiversity with many parks and preserves. Literary environmental writer Alex Shoumatoff hailed Westchester County as the "most richly diversified deciduous forest in the world" in a 1978 The New Yorker profile, at the time estimating that it contained 4,200 species of plants.

There are many natural areas that attract wildlife including Marshlands Conservancy and the Edith G. Read Wildlife Sanctuary, a 179-acre sanctuary along Long Island Sound migratory flyway. In winter months, the 85-acre lake hosts more than 5,000 ducks and was recognized by Audubon New York.

== Plants ==
There are 1,168 species of vascular plants in Westchester County, according to the Parks Department.

Endangered plants:

- Bog clubmoss Lycopodiella inundata
- Netted chain fern Lorinseria areolata
- Yellow harlequin Corydalis flavula
- Spring avens Geum vernum
- Winter grape Vitis vulpina
- Tall thistle Cirsium altissimum
- Purple everlasting Gnaphalium purpureum
- Stiff-leaf goldenrod Solidago rigida
- Bicknell's sedge Carex bicknellii
- Soft fox sedge Carex conjuncta
- Cat-tail sedge Carex typhina
- Long-beaked bald rush Rhynchospora scirpoides
- Large twayblade Liparis liliifolia

Threatened plants:

- Purple milkweed Asclepias purpurascens
- Swamp cottonwood Populus heterophylla
- Rattlebox Crotalaria sagittalis
- Swamp agrimony Agrimonia parviflora
- Featherfoil Hottonia inflata
- Slender pinweed Lechea tenuifolia
- Shrubby St. Johnswort Hypericum prolificum
- Mudwort Limosella australis
- Winged monkeyflower Mimulus alatus
- Slender saltmarsh aster Symphyotrichum tenuifolium
- Spongy arrowhead Sagittaria montevidensis spongiosa
- Strap-leaf arrowhead Sagittaria subulata
- Spotted pondweed Potamogeton pulcher
- Angled spikerush Eleocharis quadrangulata
- Lesser bladderwort Utricularia minor
- Yellow lady slipper Cypripedium parviflorum

Special concern plants:

- Walking fern Asplenium rhizophyllum
- Purple cliffbrake Pellaea atropurpurea
- Eastern prickly pear Opuntia humifusa
- Trailing arbutus Epigaea repens
- Grass-of-Parnassus Parnassia glauca
- Pitcher plant Sarracenia purpurea
- Four-leaf milkweed Asclepias quadrifolia
- River birch Betula nigra
- Striped maple Acer pensylvanicum
- American holly Ilex opaca
- Prickly hornwort Ceratophyllum echinatum
- Dittany Cunila origanoides
- Stiff yellow flax Linum striatum
- Wild pink Silene caroliniana
- Blunt mountain mint Pycnanthemum muticum
- Small floating bladderwort Utricularia radiata
- Large yellow-eyed grass Xyris smalliana
- Showy orchis Galearis spectabilis

Invasive plants: Invasive species pose a threat to biodiversity in Westchester County. In order to protect hundreds of species and wildlife, Westchester County has participated in gathering data about invasive plants through the Lower Hudson Partnership for Invasive Species Management (LHPRISM). The Cornell Cooperative Extension of Westchester is a resource for learning more about how to identify and map many of the species listed below.

- Black jetbead Rhodotypos scandens
- Burning bush Euonymus alatus
- Chinese silver grass Miscanthus sinensis
- Chinese wisteria Wisteria sinensis
- Garlic mustard Alliaria petiolata
- Ground ivy Glechoma hederacea
- Incised fumewort Corydalis incisa
- Japanese Angelica tree Aralia elata
- Japanese barberry Berberis thunbergii
- Japanese knotweed Reynoutria japonica
- Japanese stiltgrass Microstegium vimineum
- Lesser celandine Ficaria verna
- Mile-a-Minute Persicaria perfoliata
- Mugwort Artemisia vulgaris
- Multiflora Rose Rosa multiflora
- Norway maple Acer platanoides
- Oriental Bittersweet Celastrus orbiculatus
- Pale swallow-wort Cynanchum rossicum
- Porcelain-Berry Ampelopsis brevipedunculata
- Princess tree, Empress tree Paulownia tomentosa
- Tatarian Honeysuckle Lonicera tatarica
- Tree of heaven Ailanthus altissima
- Wineberry Rubus phoenicolasius

== Birds ==
There are 311 species of birds in Westchester County, as documented by the Parks Department. The local Audubon Society chapter records 368 bird species.

Endangered birds:

- Peregrine falcon Falco peregrinus
- Loggerhead shrike Lanius ludovicianus
- Least bittern Ixobrychus exilis
- Bald eagle Haliaeetus leucocephalus
- King rail Rallus elegans
- Common tern Sterna hirundo
- Henslow’s sparrow Ammodramus henslowii
- Osprey Pandion haliaetus
- Cooper’s hawk Accipiter cooperii
- Northern goshawk Accipiter gentilis
- Red-shouldered hawk Buteo lineatus
- Golden-winged warbler Vermivora chrysoptera
- Cerulean warbler Dendroica cerulea
- Vesper sparrow Pooecetes gramineus
- Grasshopper sparrow Ammodramus savannarum
- Seaside sparrow Ammodramus maritimus
- Savannah sparrow Passerculus sandwichensis
- Kentucky warbler Oporornis formosus

Threatened birds:

- Yellow-breasted chat Icteria virens
- American barn owl Tyto furcata
- Common raven Corvus corax
- American woodcock Scolopax minor
- Saltmarsh sharp-tailed sparrow Ammodramus caudacutus
- Eastern meadowlark Sturnella magna
- Bobolink Dolichonyx oryzivorus

Special Concern birds:

- Common nighthawk Chordeiles minor
- Whip-poor-will Caprimulgus vociferus
- American black duck Anas rubripes
- Wood thrush Hylocichla mustelina
- Prairie warbler Dendroica discolor
- Worm-eating warbler Helmitheros vermivorus
- Canada warbler Wilsonia canadensis

== Mammals ==
There are 33 species of mammals in Westchester County.

Special concern mammals:

- River otter Lutra canadensis
- Bobcat Lynx rufus

== Reptiles ==
There are 19 species of reptiles in Westchester County.

Endangered reptiles:

- Bog turtle Clemmys muhlenbergi
- Wood turtle Clemmys insculpta
- Timber rattlesnake Crotalus horridus

Threatened reptiles:

- Spotted turtle Clemmys guttata
- Eastern box turtle Terrapene carolina
- Northern fence lizard Sceloporus undulatus
- Eastern ribbon snake Thamnophis saurita

Special concern reptiles:

- Five-lined skink Eumeces fasciatus
- Northern copperhead Agkistrodon contortrix
- Eastern hognose snake Heterodon platyrhinos
- Worm snake Carphophis amoenus

== Insects ==
=== Butterflies ===
Endangered butterflies:

- Aphrodyte Fritillary Speyeria aphrodite
- Bronze Copper Lycaena hyllus
- Leonard’s Skipper Hesperia leonardus
- Regal Fritillary Speyeria idalia
- Silver-bordered Fritillary Boloria selene
- Two-spotted Skipper Euphyes bimacula
- West Virginia White Pieris virginiensis

Threatened butterflies:

- Silvery Checkerspot Chlosyne nycteis

Special concern butterflies:

- Brown Elfin Callophrys augustinus
- Dion Skipper Euphyes dion
- Eyed Brown Satyrodes eurydice
- Edward’s Hairstreak Satyrium edwardsii
- Harris’ Checkerspot Chlosyne harrisii
- Meadow Fritillary Boloria bellona
