= Meadow fritillary =

Meadow fritillary is a common name given for two butterfly species:

- In Europe, the name is used for Melitaea parthenoides
- In North America, the name is used for Boloria bellona
