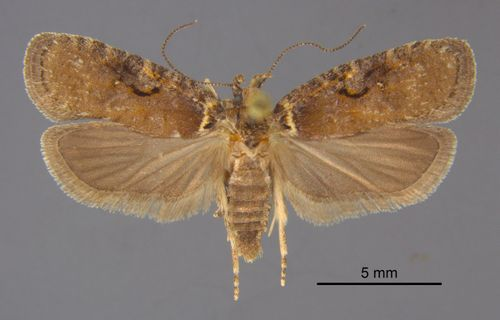

Scientific classification
- Kingdom: Animalia
- Phylum: Arthropoda
- Clade: Pancrustacea
- Class: Insecta
- Order: Lepidoptera
- Family: Depressariidae
- Genus: Agonopterix
- Species: A. hyperella

Binomial name
- Agonopterix hyperella Ely, 1910

Synonyms
- Depressaria testifica Meyrick, 1920

= Agonopterix hyperella =

Species of moth

Agonopterix hyperella is a moth in the family Depressariidae. It was described by Charles Russell Ely in 1910. It is found in North America, where it has been recorded from Alabama, Indiana, Maryland, Massachusetts, North Carolina, Ohio and Tennessee.

The wingspan is 15–17 mm. The forewings are dark lavender gray, with brownish shading. There is a yellowish-white band near the base, usually containing a few black scales. There are small yellowish and black patches along the costal margin and a black crescent-shaped line on the disc with a white discal spot beyond it. The hindwings are smoky gray.

The larvae feed on Hypericum prolificum and Hypericum perforatum.
