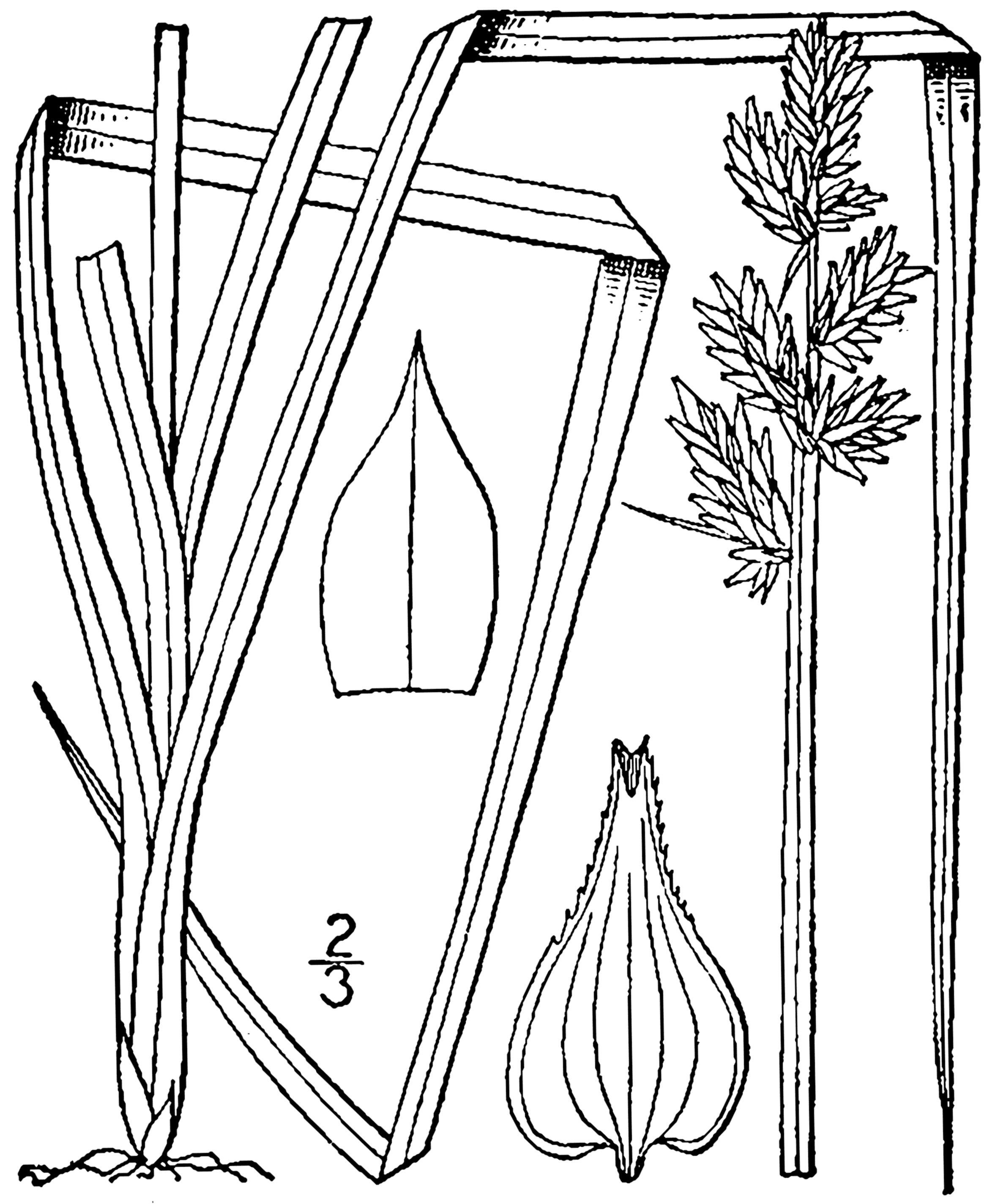
- Illustration from 1913

Scientific classification
- Kingdom: Plantae
- Clade: Tracheophytes
- Clade: Angiosperms
- Clade: Monocots
- Clade: Commelinids
- Order: Poales
- Family: Cyperaceae
- Genus: Carex
- Section: Carex sect. Vulpinae
- Species: C. conjuncta

Binomial name
- Carex conjuncta Boott

Synonyms
- Carex vulpina J.Carey ex Dewey; Vignea conjuncta (Boott) Soják

= Carex conjuncta =

Species of grass-like plant

Carex conjuncta, known as soft fox sedge, is a species of sedge that was first formally named by Francis Boott in 1862. It is endemic to the central and eastern United States.

== Description ==
Carex conjuncta is a clump forming herbaceous perennial. The old dried stems from the following season persist around the plant. It grows 40–80 cm (16–31 in) tall with stems that are stout but soft, and typically 2 to 4 (though up to 10) mm wide. The perigynia are elongated, 3 to 5 mm long and approximately half as wide, broadest near the base and tapering to a toothed beak. The achenes are 2.2 mm long and 1.4 mm wide.

== Distribution and habitat ==
The natural distribution of Carex conjuncta is in the United States from New York east to Minnesota and South Dakota, south to Virginia and Kansas. It is an uncommon species over much of its natural range, but is more common at the center of its range in Missouri and Illinois. Carex conjuncta is found in damp woods, hardwood swamps, wet meadows, and marsh edges.

In Minnesota it is known from a limited number of locations in alluvial forest in the Cannon River Valley, where it was first found in 1976. In Minnesota it grows in moist forests of Ulmus americana, Juglans nigra, and Acer saccharinum. These forests often flood in the spring, with soils remaining saturated all growing season. In Minnesota, other uncommon species found in association with Carex conjuncta include Carex davisii and Carex grayi.
