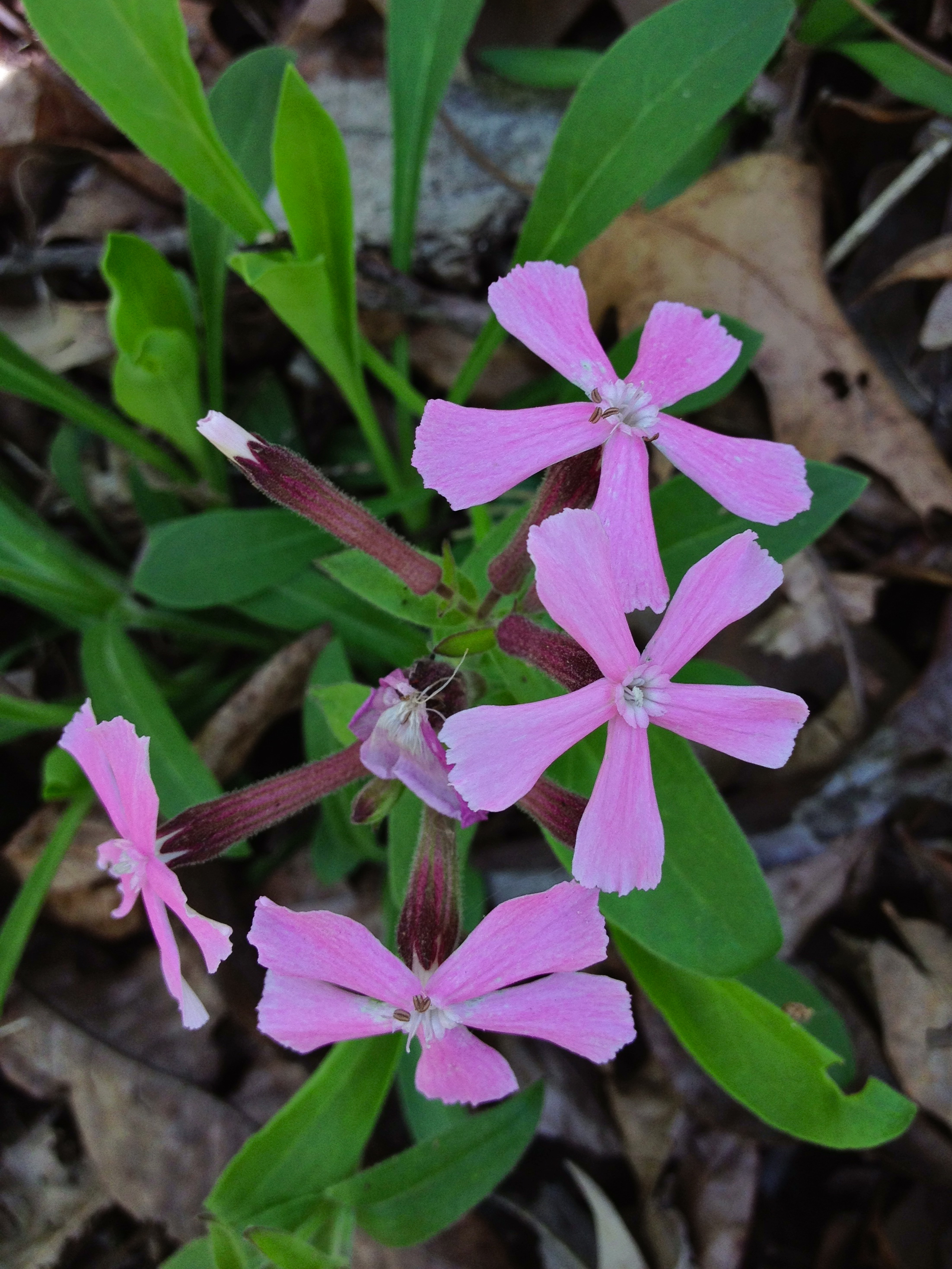

Scientific classification
- Kingdom: Plantae
- Clade: Tracheophytes
- Clade: Angiosperms
- Clade: Eudicots
- Order: Caryophyllales
- Family: Caryophyllaceae
- Genus: Silene
- Species: S. caroliniana

Binomial name
- Silene caroliniana Walter

= Silene caroliniana =

Species of flowering plant

Silene caroliniana, the sticky catchfly or wild pink, is a spring-flowering perennial forb with pink flowers.

== Description ==
The corolla varies in color ranging from a dark pink to white.

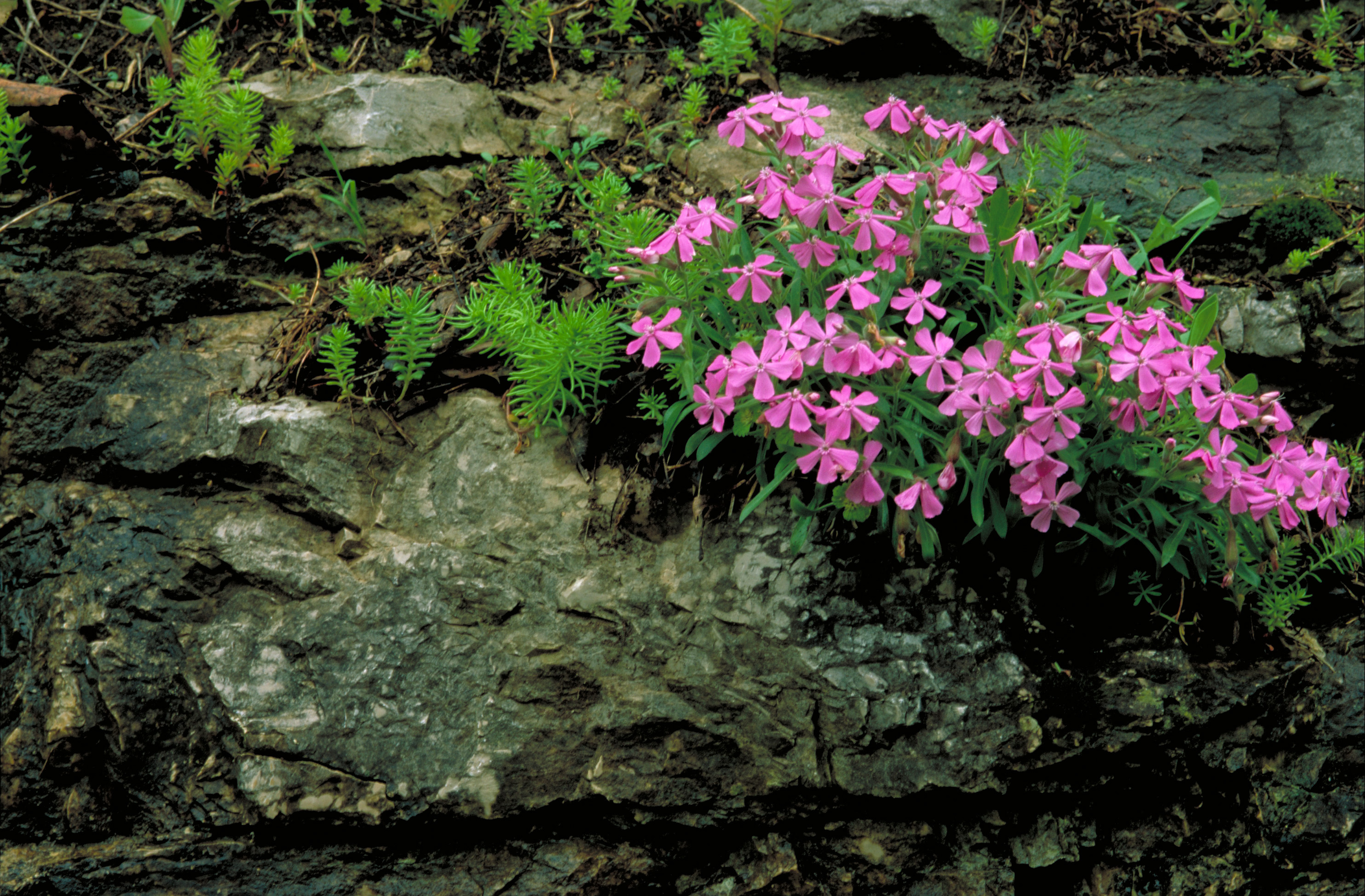

== Distribution and habitat ==
The species is native to the Eastern United States. It is found growing in habitats such as dry rocky or sandy forests, barrens, and outcrops.

== Ecology ==
When in bloom the flowers are visited by pollinators, like large bees, bee flies, and hawkmoths.

The species is listed as endangered by the state of Florida.
