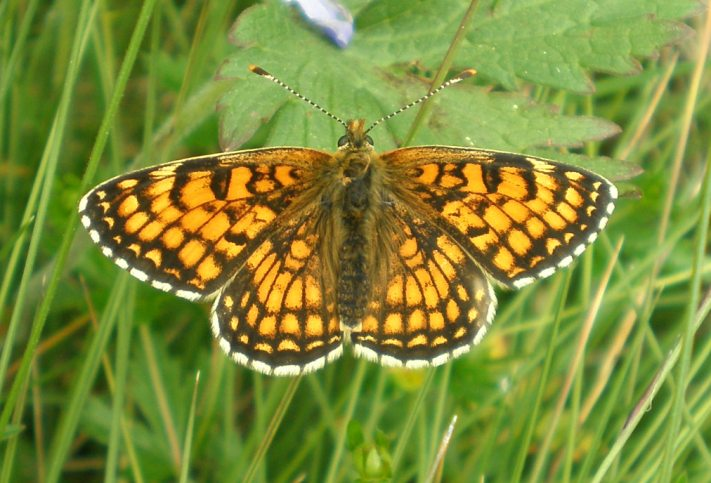

Conservation status
- Least Concern (IUCN 3.1)

Scientific classification
- Kingdom: Animalia
- Phylum: Arthropoda
- Class: Insecta
- Order: Lepidoptera
- Family: Nymphalidae
- Genus: Melitaea
- Species: M. parthenoides

Binomial name
- Melitaea parthenoides C. Keferstein, 1851

Synonyms
- Melitaea athalia var. parthenoides Keferstein, 1851; Mellicta parthenoides (Keferstein, 1851)

= Melitaea parthenoides =

Meadow fritillary, a butterfly of the family Nymphalidae from south-western Europe

Melitaea parthenoides, the meadow fritillary, is a butterfly of the family Nymphalidae. Note that the common name meadow fritillary is also used for the North American species Boloria bellona.

== Distribution ==
It is found in south-western Europe, more specifically on the Iberian Peninsula, south-western France, parts of the Italian Alps and southern and south-western Germany and a few regions of Switzerland.

== Description ==
The wingspan is 28–34 mm. Upper surface very similar to Melitaea athalia, especially in pattern, but the black markings much thinner, yellowish red the prevalent colour. While in Melitaea aurelia and athalia the yellowish red spots may be said to be united to bands, parthenoides has orange bands of almost even width and traversed by thin black veins; the median band especially is very broad, the spots composing it being almost twice as long as wide, which is hardly ever the case in European athalia. The underside likewise resembles athalia in pattern, but is brighter, more variegated, the black edges of the various bands being more prominent, the colours contrasting more distinctly.

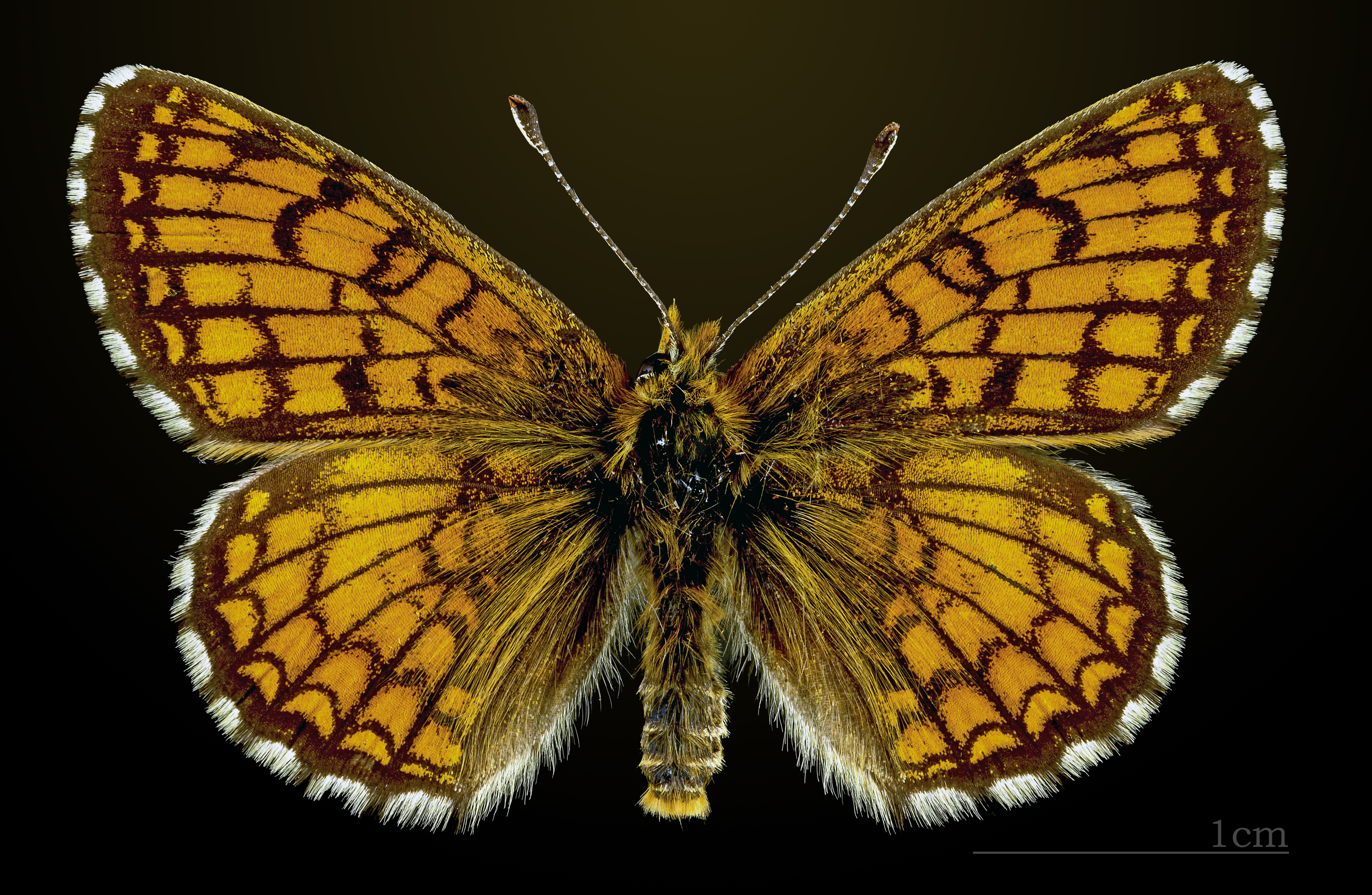
Male

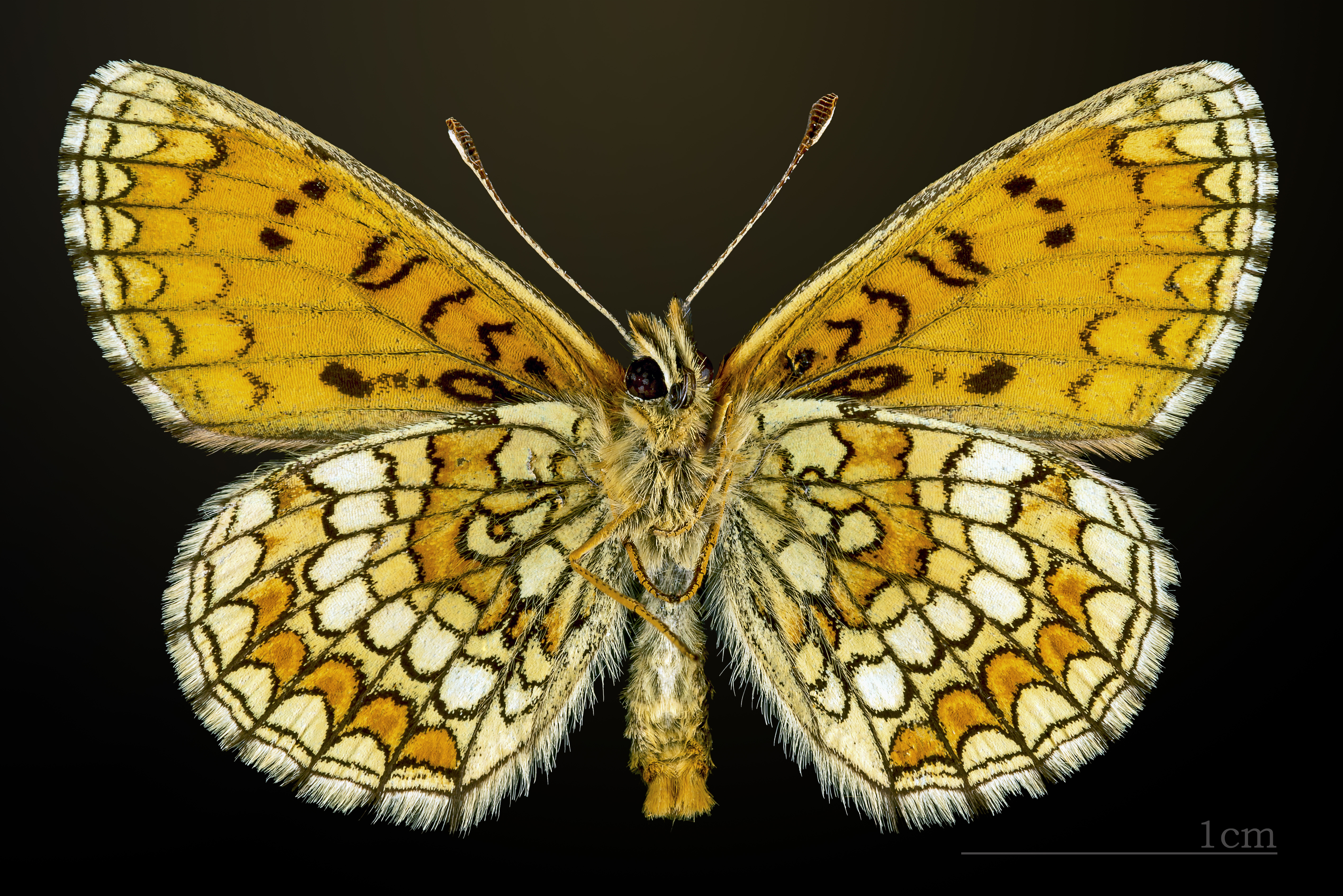
Male underside

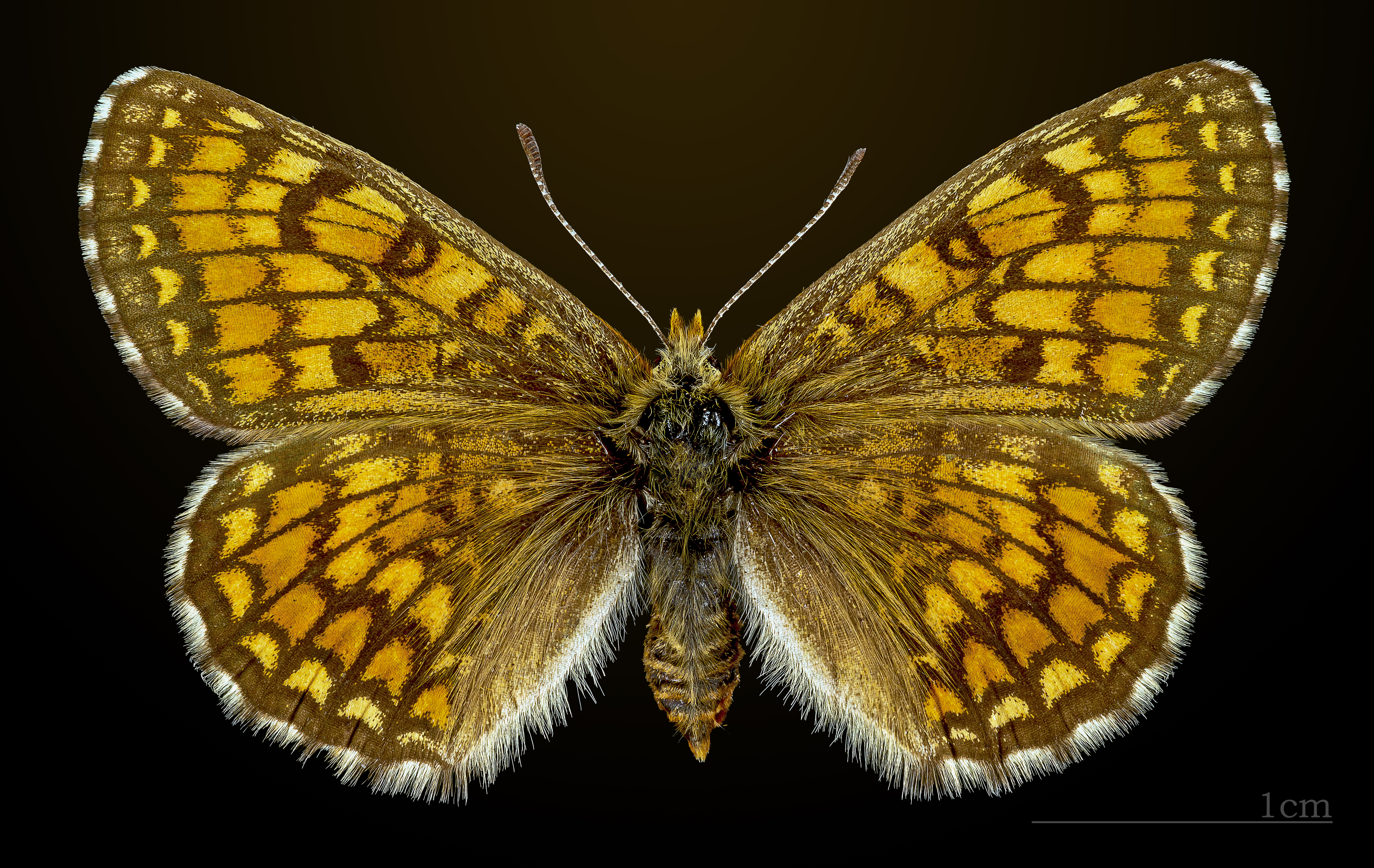
Female

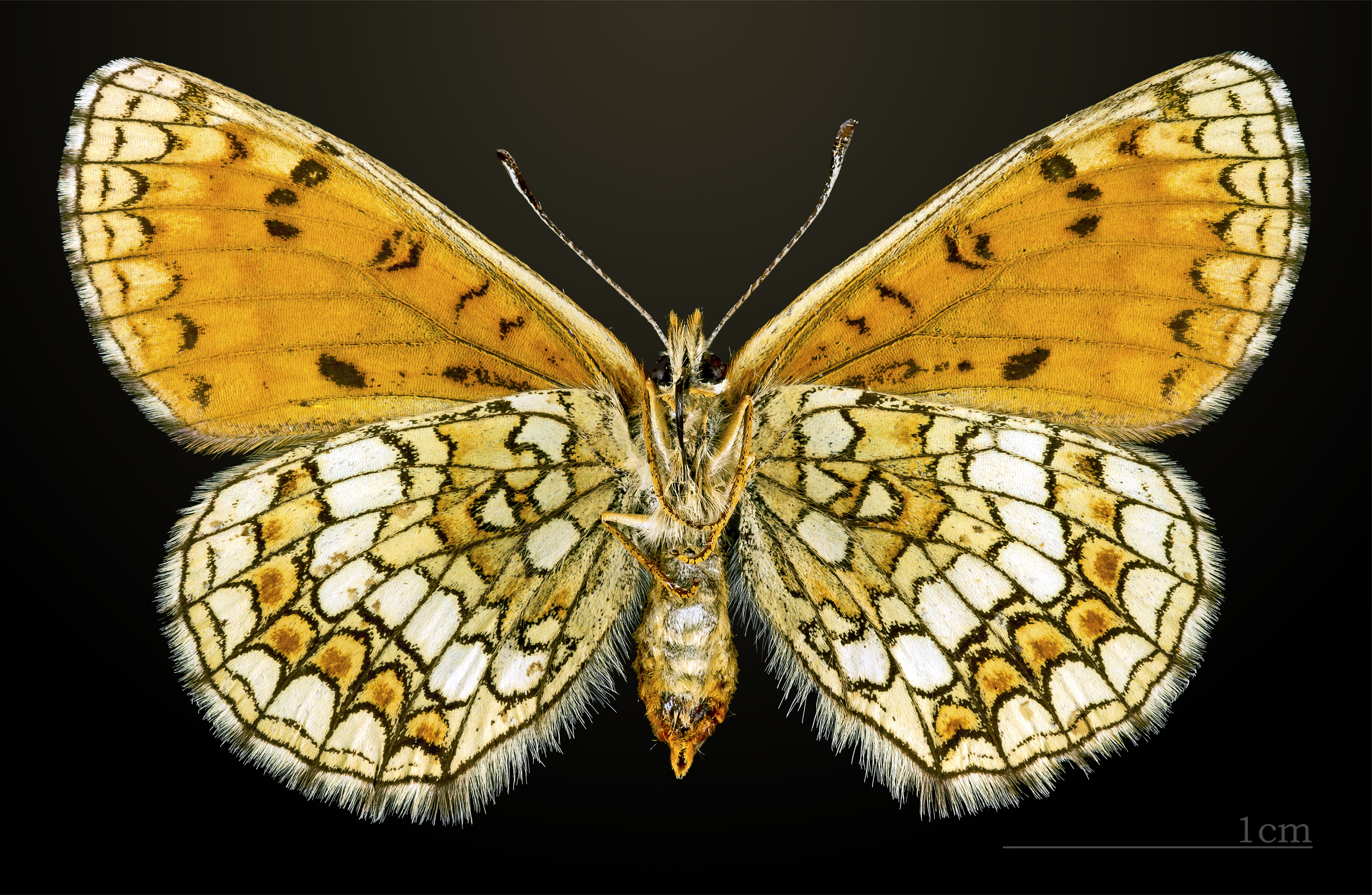
Female underside

== Biology ==
In dry, favourable climates, adults are on wing in two generations, from May to June and from August to September. At high altitudes, there is one generation from June to July. The larvae feed on Plantago species, mainly P. lanceolata.
