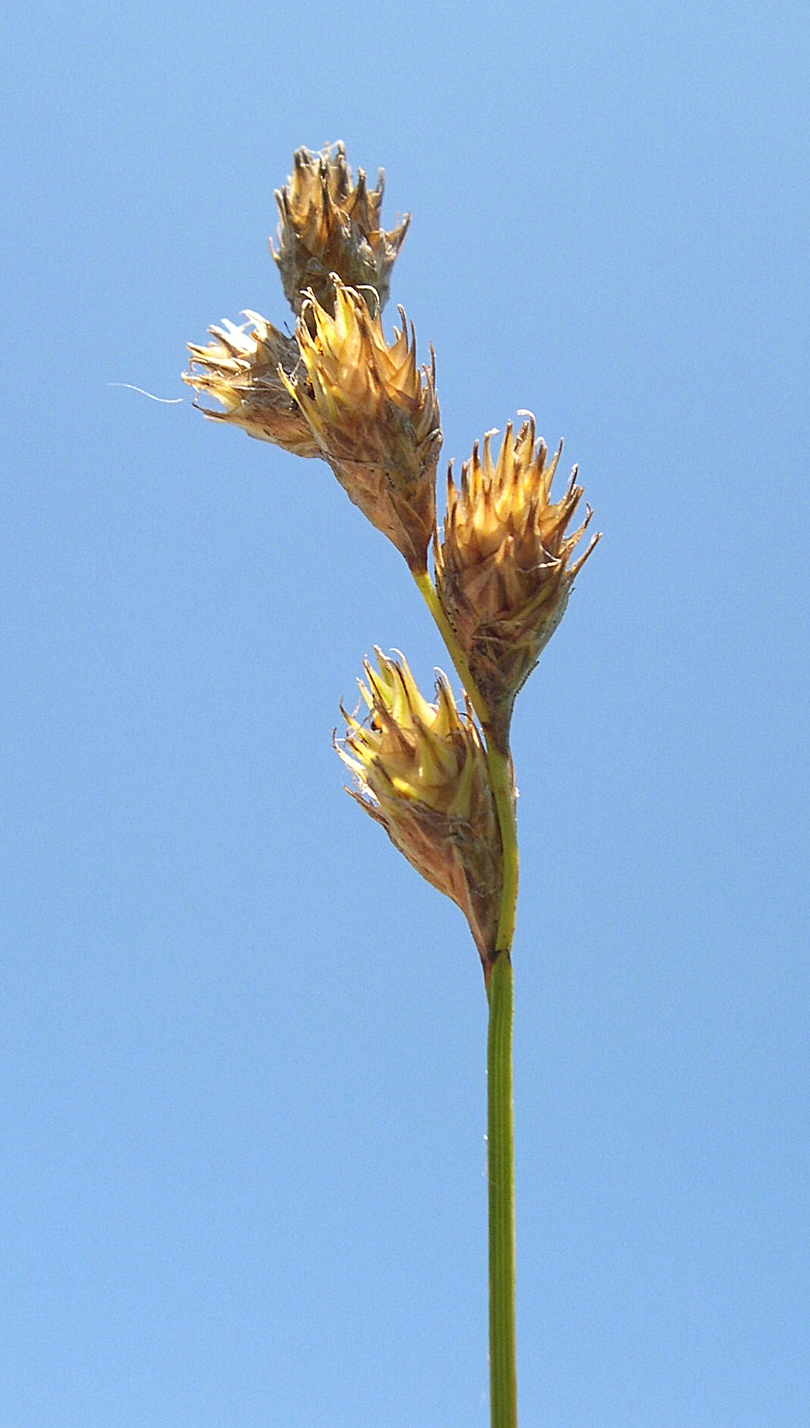

Scientific classification
- Kingdom: Plantae
- Clade: Tracheophytes
- Clade: Angiosperms
- Clade: Monocots
- Clade: Commelinids
- Order: Poales
- Family: Cyperaceae
- Genus: Carex
- Subgenus: Carex subg. Vignea
- Section: Carex sect. Ovales
- Species: C. bicknellii

Binomial name
- Carex bicknellii Britton

= Carex bicknellii =

Species of grass-like plant

Carex bicknellii, known as Bicknell's sedge and copper-shouldered oval sedge, is a species of sedge native to North America. Carex bicknellii grows in small clumps with fewer than 25 flowering stems per clump. It is found in mesic to dry prairies, savannas, and open woodlands.
