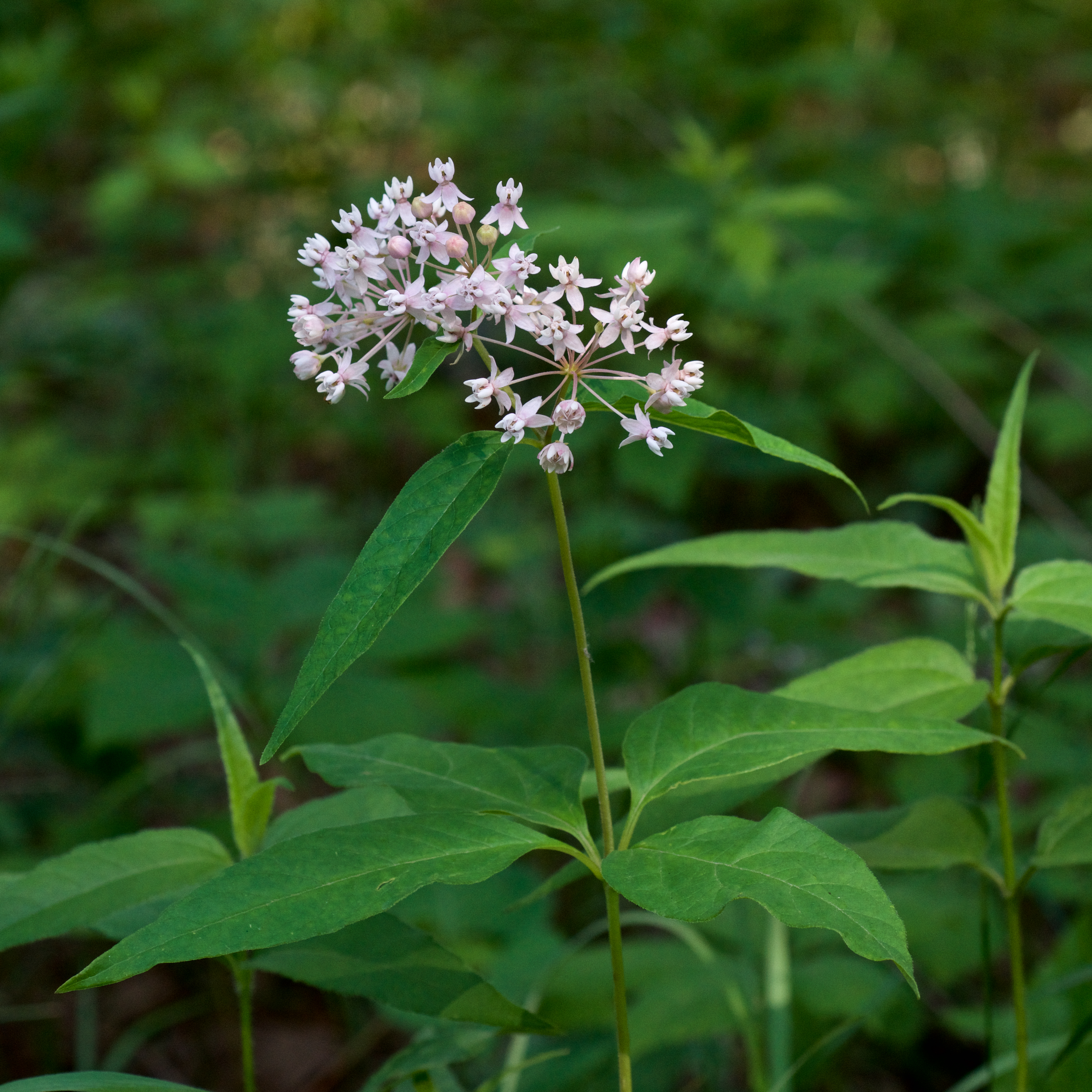

Conservation status
- Secure (NatureServe)

Scientific classification
- Kingdom: Plantae
- Clade: Tracheophytes
- Clade: Angiosperms
- Clade: Eudicots
- Clade: Asterids
- Order: Gentianales
- Family: Apocynaceae
- Genus: Asclepias
- Species: A. quadrifolia

Binomial name
- Asclepias quadrifolia Jacq.

= Asclepias quadrifolia =

Species of flowering plant

Asclepias quadrifolia, commonly called four-leaved milkweed or fourleaf milkweed, is a species of milkweed in the Apocynaceae (dogbane) family. It is sometimes referred to as whorled milkweed, but it should not be confused with Asclepias verticillata. A. quadrifolia occurs in the eastern United States and Canada.

== Description ==
Fourleaf milkweed is a perennial herb with an upright stem growing from a fleshy rhizome. The stem has a milky sap. The plant is small and slender compared to other milkweeds at only 50 centimetres (20 in) tall. Leaves are usually elliptic to ovate and 2.5–12.0 centimetres (1.0–4.7 in) long and 1–6 centimetres (0.4–2.4 in) wide. Leaves are opposite and appear in 3 to 4 sets on the stem, with one of the higher sets having 4 leaves arranged in a whorl (giving the plant its common name) and the other sets consisting of only 2 leaves.

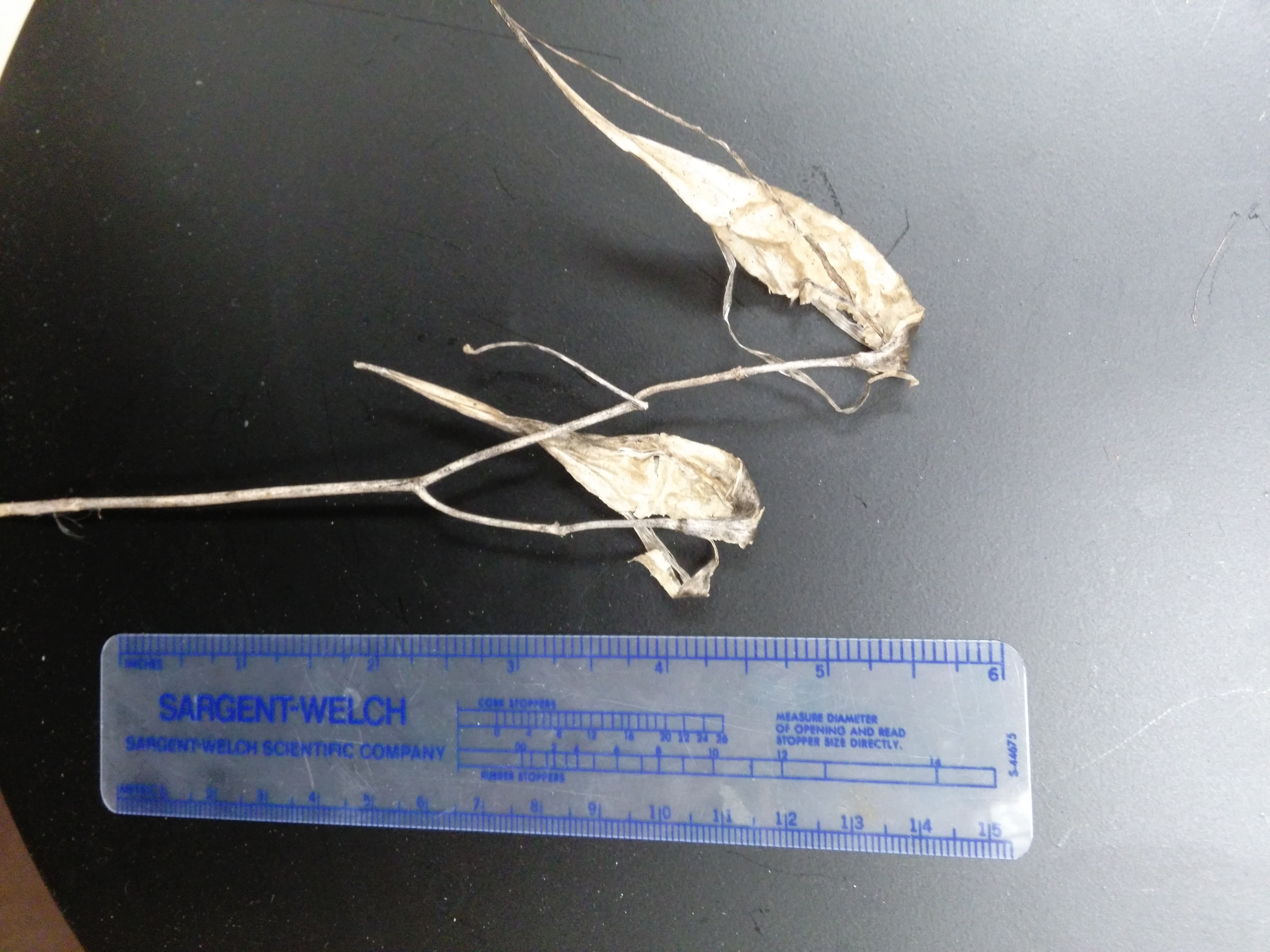
Approximately 1 year old remaining pods of fourleaf milkweed

Pale pink to white flowers are borne in 1 to 3 rounded, usually pendulous clusters, or umbels from the leaf axils and terminus.

The fruit is a follicle or pod that is very slender, 8.1–14.2 centimetres (3.2–5.6 in) long and 0.6–0.8 centimetres (.25–.3 in) thick, lacking tubercles, minutely hairy to glabrous. The seeds are broadly oval with a length up to 0.8 centimetres (.3 in). They are tufted with white to tan hairs at their tips.

== Distribution and habitat ==
A. quadrifolia is native in the United States from Kansas and Oklahoma in the west, to Mississippi and Alabama in the south, and New Hampshire in the north and east. It is an endangered species in Ontario. Unlike more commonly known species such as common milkweed or butterflyweed, fourleaf milkweed is a woodland denizen. It usually occurs in dry, rocky open forest. It is frequently found on upland slopes.

== Ecology ==
Flowers bloom from May to July. Insects that take nectar from the plant include bumblebees and other bees, wasps, ants, flies, and butterflies. The caterpillars of the monarch butterfly feed on the foliage.

== Conservation ==
A. quadrifolia was listed as an endangered species in Ontario in 2010. Only 2 populations are known to remain in the province, both in Prince Edward County. The plant is also listed as endangered in New Hampshire and threatened in Rhode Island.

== Toxicity ==
Most Asclepias are toxic if consumed in large quantities due to cardiac glycoside and resinoid content.

== Cultivation ==
Fourleaf milkweed is rare in cultivation.
