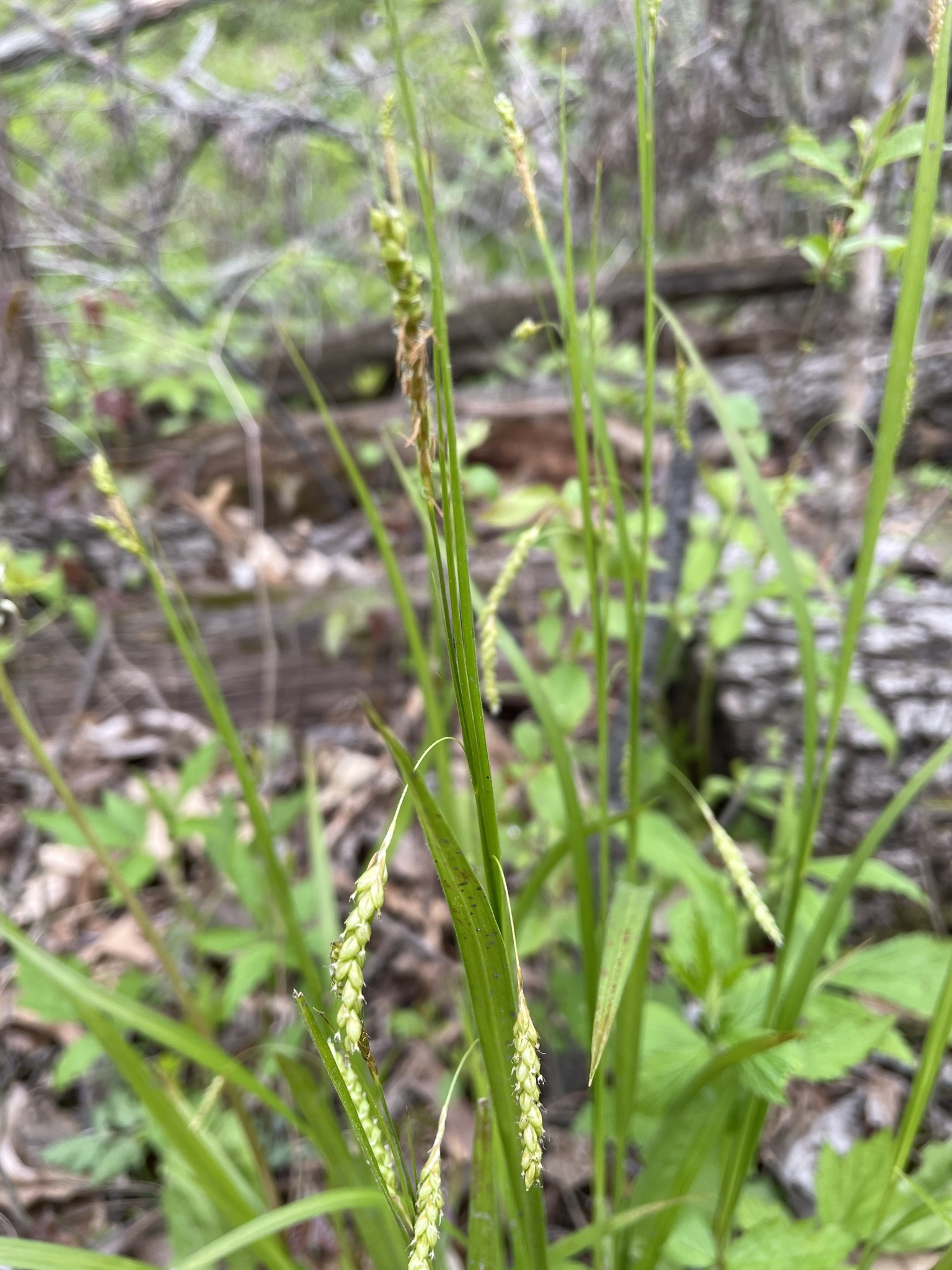

Scientific classification
- Kingdom: Plantae
- Clade: Tracheophytes
- Clade: Angiosperms
- Clade: Monocots
- Clade: Commelinids
- Order: Poales
- Family: Cyperaceae
- Genus: Carex
- Subgenus: Carex subg. Carex
- Section: Carex sect. Hymenochlaenae
- Species: C. formosa

Binomial name
- Carex formosa Dewey

= Carex formosa =

Species of grass-like plant

Carex formosa, also known as handsome sedge, is a species of sedge native to North America. It is listed as an endangered species in the US states of Minnesota, New Jersey, and Pennsylvania, as threatened in Connecticut, Massachusetts, New York, and Wisconsin, and as presumed extirpated in Ohio.
