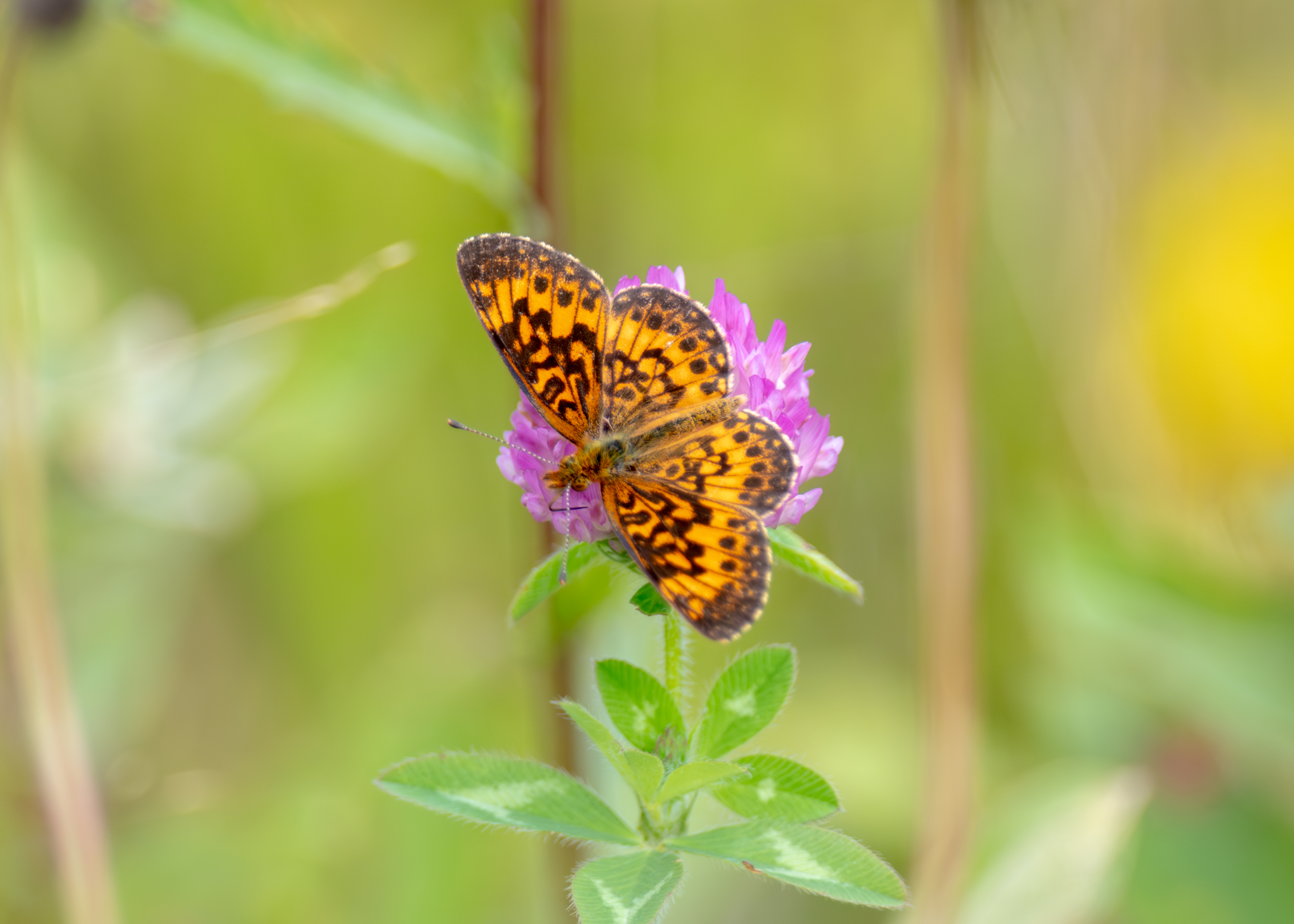
- Boloria myrina atrocostalis in Aroostook County, Maine

Scientific classification
- Kingdom: Animalia
- Phylum: Arthropoda
- Clade: Pancrustacea
- Class: Insecta
- Order: Lepidoptera
- Family: Nymphalidae
- Genus: Boloria
- Species: B. myrina

Binomial name
- Boloria myrina Cramer, 1777

= Silver-bordered fritillary =

Species of butterfly

The silver-bordered fritillary (Boloria myrina) is a species of butterfly of the family Nymphalidae. Previously classified under a single species, B. myrina was determined to be a distinct species from B. selene through genomic sequencing.

Boloria myrina atrocostalis, known as the dark-bordered fritillary, is a subspecies inhabiting North America.

== Status ==
The dark-bordered fritillary is classified by NatureServe as Imperiled in Oregon and Vulnerable in both Washington and Yukon.
