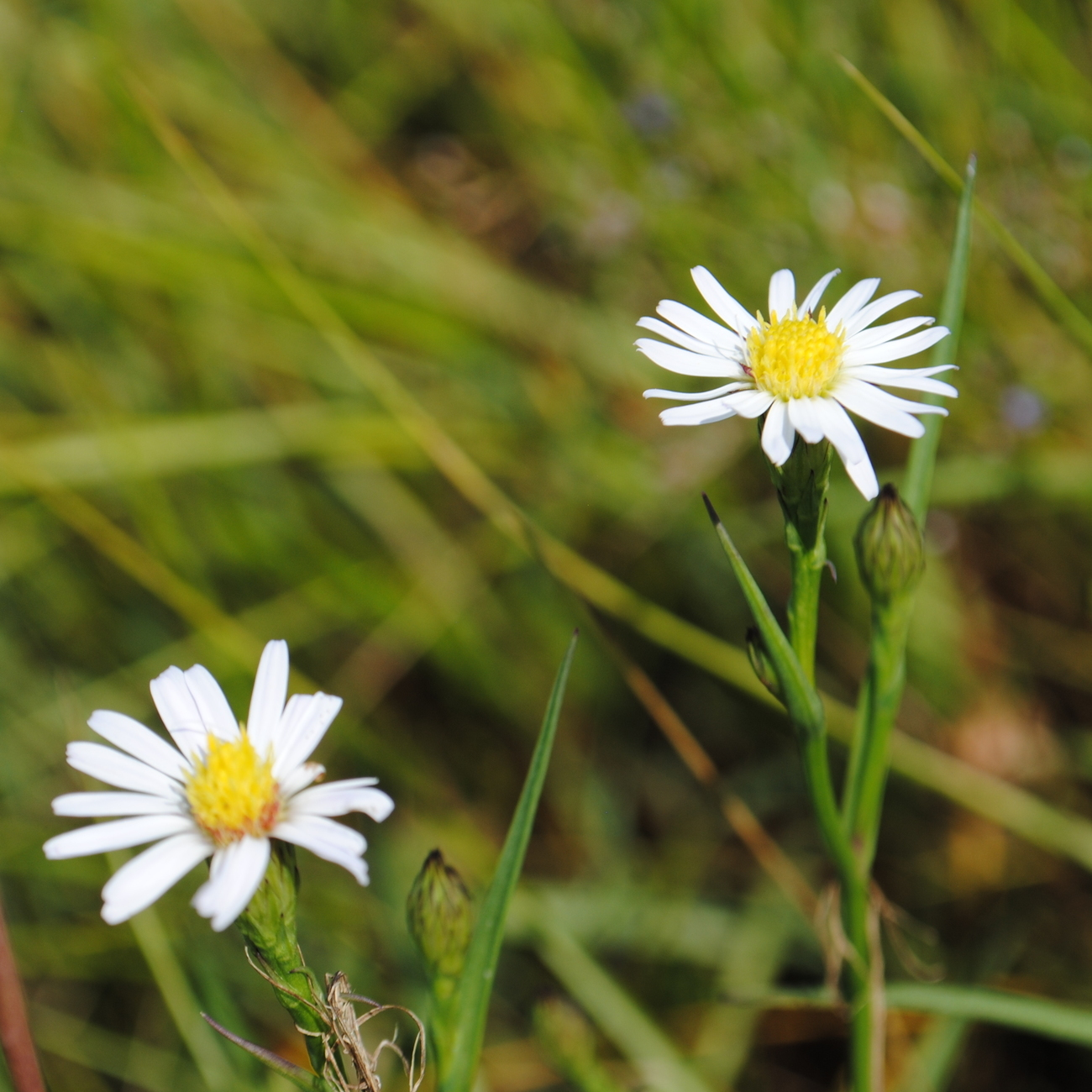

Conservation status
- Secure (NatureServe)

Scientific classification
- Kingdom: Plantae
- Clade: Tracheophytes
- Clade: Angiosperms
- Clade: Eudicots
- Clade: Asterids
- Order: Asterales
- Family: Asteraceae
- Genus: Symphyotrichum
- Subgenus: Symphyotrichum subg. Astropolium
- Species: S. tenuifolium

Binomial name
- Symphyotrichum tenuifolium (L.) G.L.Nesom

Varieties
- S. tenuifolium var. aphyllum (R.W.Long) S.D.Sundb.; S. tenuifolium var. tenuifolium
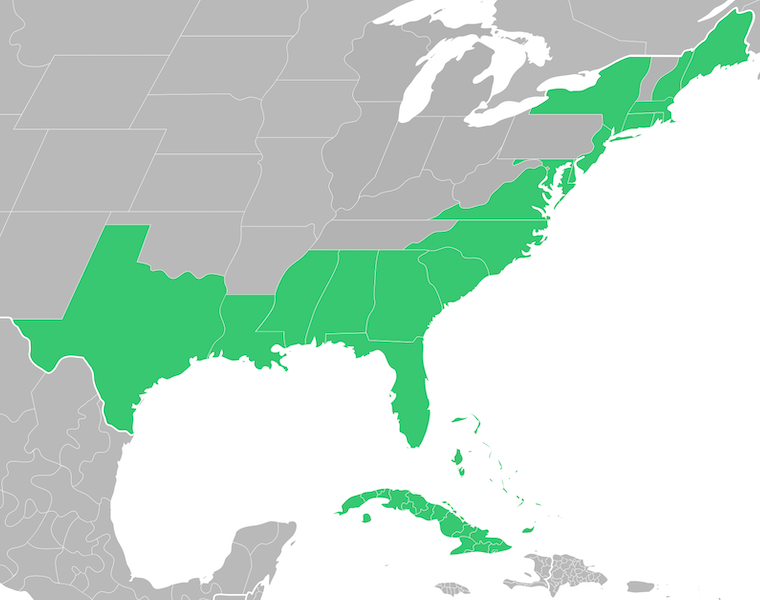
- Native distribution

Synonyms
- Basionym: Aster tenuifolius L.; Variety synonyms: var. aphyllum; Aster tenuifolius var. aphyllus R.W.Long; Aster bracei Britton ex Small; Symphyotrichum bracei (Britton ex Small) G.L.Nesom; var. tenuifolium; Aster flexuosus Nutt.; Aster junceus Nees; Aster polyphyllus Pursh ex DC.; Aster recurvatus Nees; Aster tripolium Walter; Aster virgatus Moench; Fimbristima flexuosa Raf.; Fimbristima sparsiflora Raf.; Tripolium flexuosum Nees; Venatris tenuifolius Raf.

= Symphyotrichum tenuifolium =

Species of plant in the aster family

Symphyotrichum tenuifolium (formerly Aster tenuifolius) is a species of flowering plant in the family Asteraceae and is commonly known as perennial saltmarsh aster. It is a perennial and herbaceous plant native to the eastern United States and the West Indies. There is one variety, S. tenuifolium var. aphyllum in addition to the autonym S. tenuifolium var. tenuifolium.

== Description ==
Symphyotrichum tenuifolium is a perennial and herbaceous flowering plant.

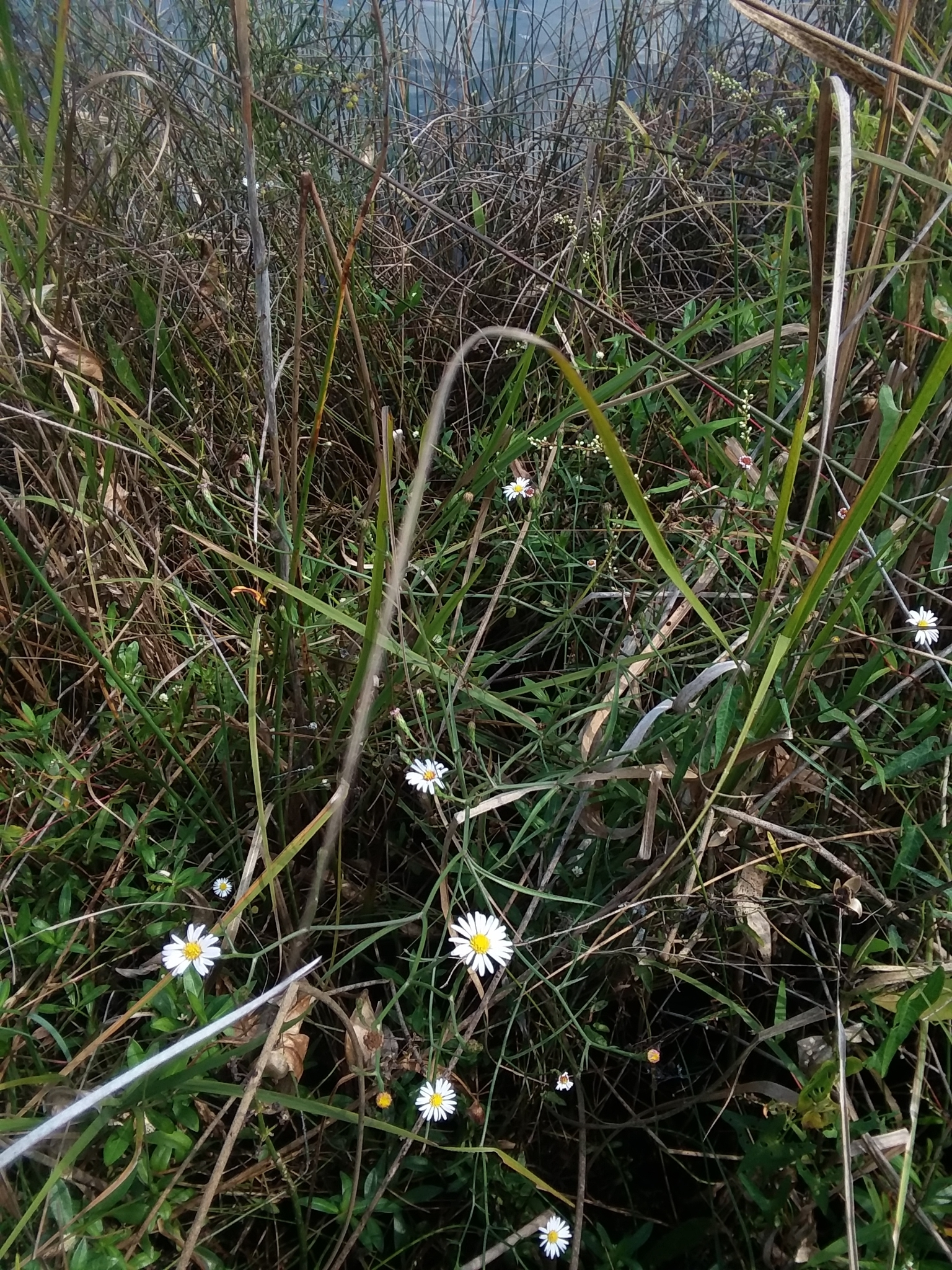
Marsh habitat

== Taxonomy ==
S. tenuifolium has one variety, S. tenuifolium var. aphyllum in addition to the autonym S. tenuifolium var. tenuifolium.

== Distribution and habitat ==
The species is native to the eastern United States and the West Indies.

== Conservation ==
As of June 2021, NatureServe lists Symphyotrichum tenuifolium as Secure (G5) worldwide, Critically Imperiled (S1) in New Hampshire, Imperiled (S2) in New York, and Vulnerable (S3) in North Carolina.
