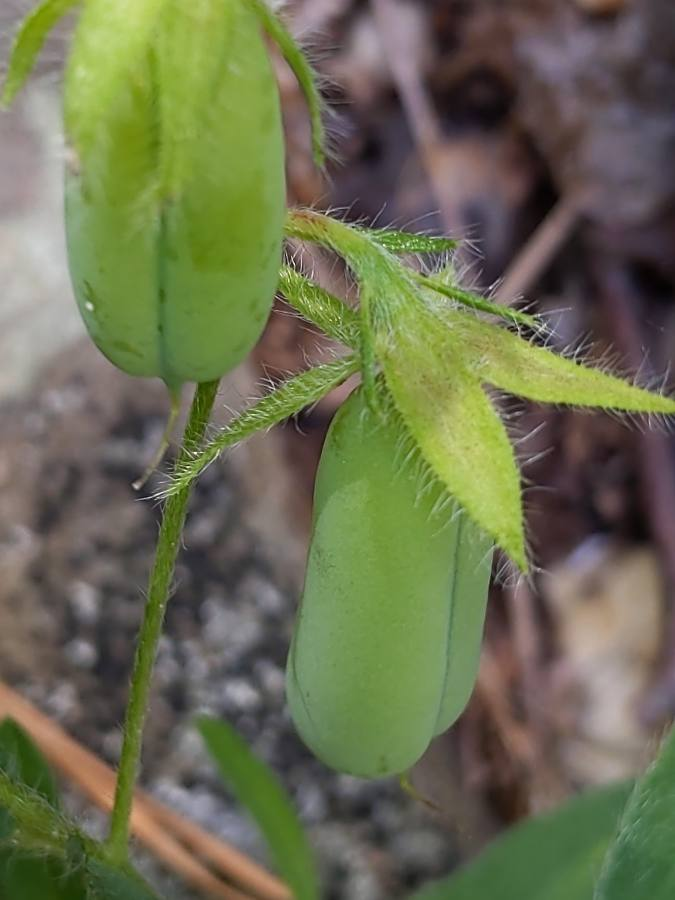

Scientific classification
- Kingdom: Plantae
- Clade: Tracheophytes
- Clade: Angiosperms
- Clade: Eudicots
- Clade: Rosids
- Order: Fabales
- Family: Fabaceae
- Subfamily: Faboideae
- Genus: Crotalaria
- Species: C. sagittalis

Binomial name
- Crotalaria sagittalis L.

= Crotalaria sagittalis =

Species of wildflower

Crotalaria sagittalis, known as arrowhead rattlebox or just rattlebox, is an annual wildflower native to the United States, Midwestern and Eastern states.

== Description ==
Rattlebox grows 6-12" tall with alternate, short-petiolate leaves and a yellow flower that yields a plump seed pod that will rattle when shaken. It is a member of the Crotalaria genus, which has 500 members commonly known as rattlepods .

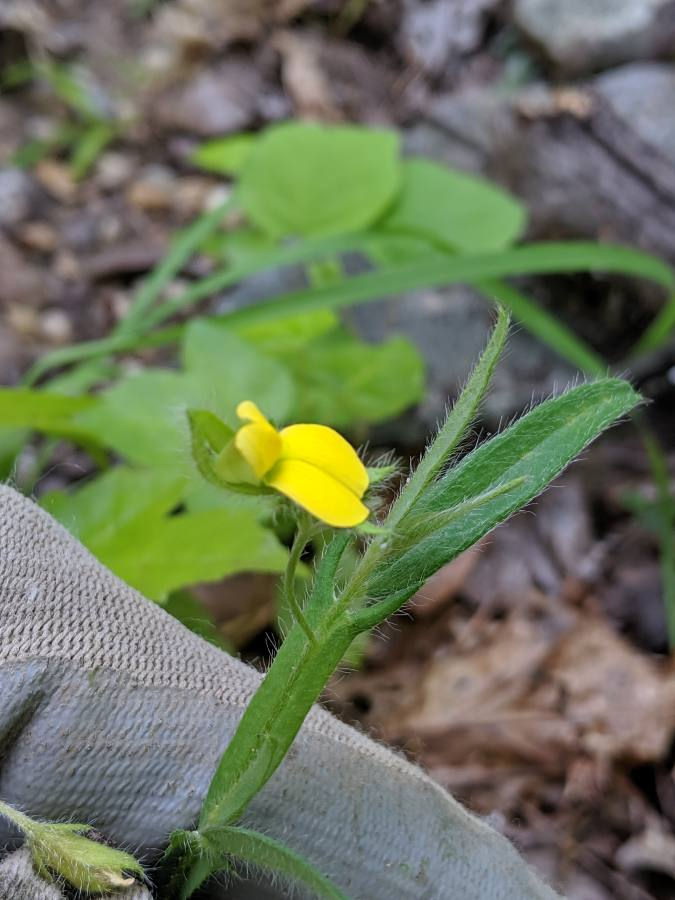
Flower

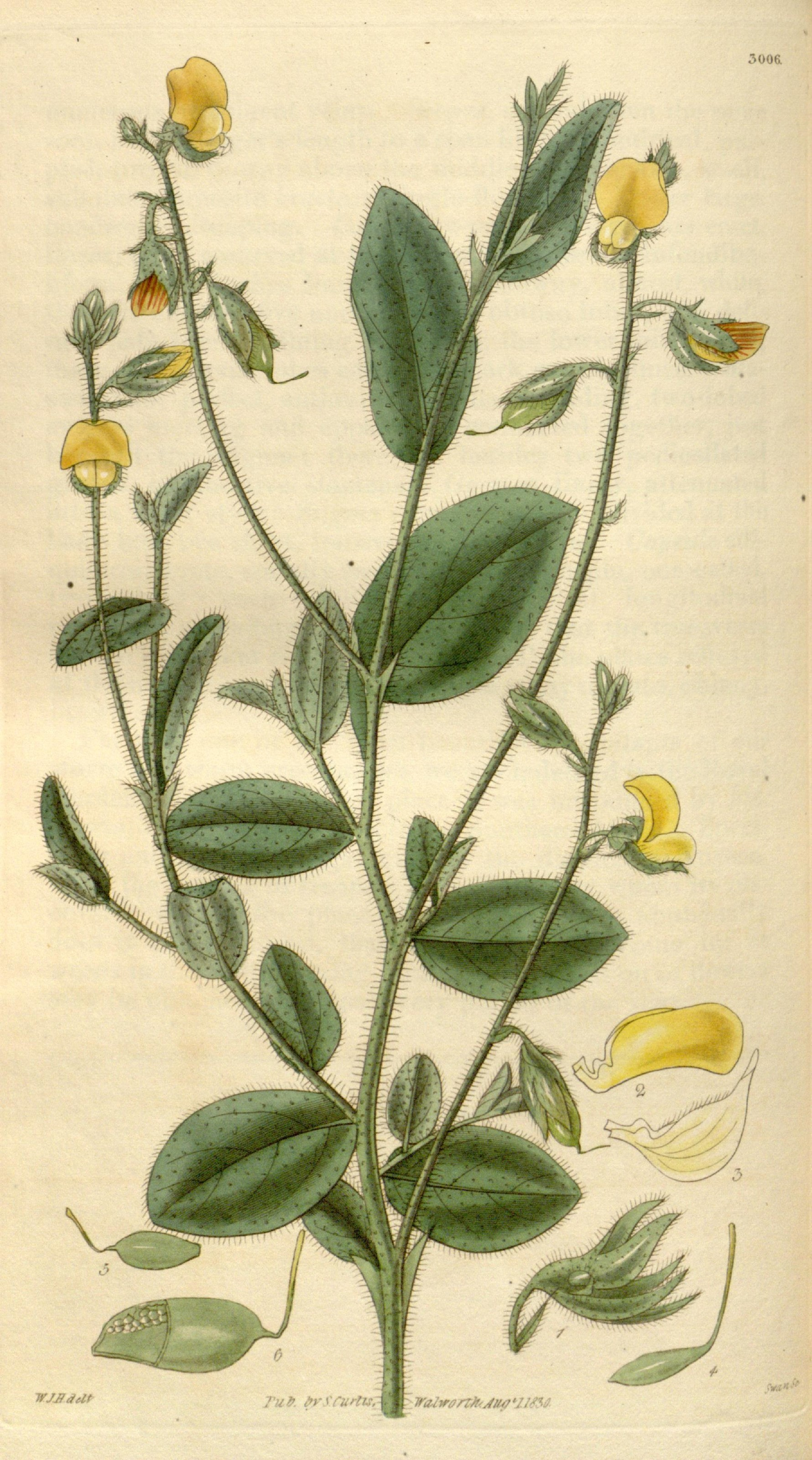
Illustration
