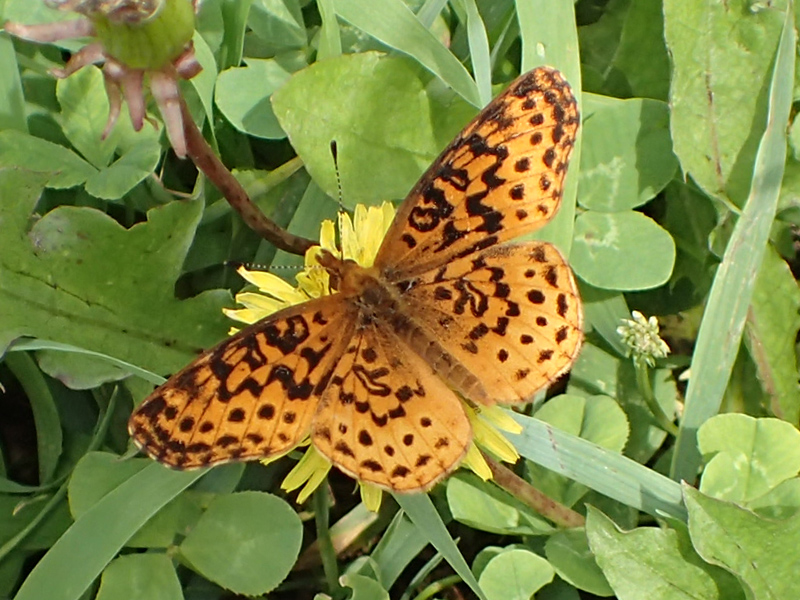

Scientific classification
- Domain: Eukaryota
- Kingdom: Animalia
- Phylum: Arthropoda
- Class: Insecta
- Order: Lepidoptera
- Family: Nymphalidae
- Genus: Boloria
- Species: B. bellona

Binomial name
- Boloria bellona (Fabricius, 1775)
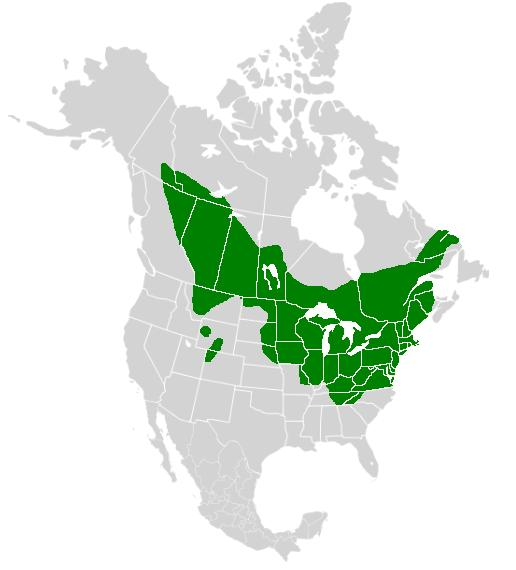

Synonyms
- Clossiana bellona; Clossiana ammiralis

= Boloria bellona =

Meadow fritillary

Species of butterfly

Boloria bellona, the meadow fritillary, is a North American butterfly in the brushfoot family, Nymphalidae. The common name, meadow fritillary, is also used for a European butterfly species, Melitaea parthenoides.

== Description ==
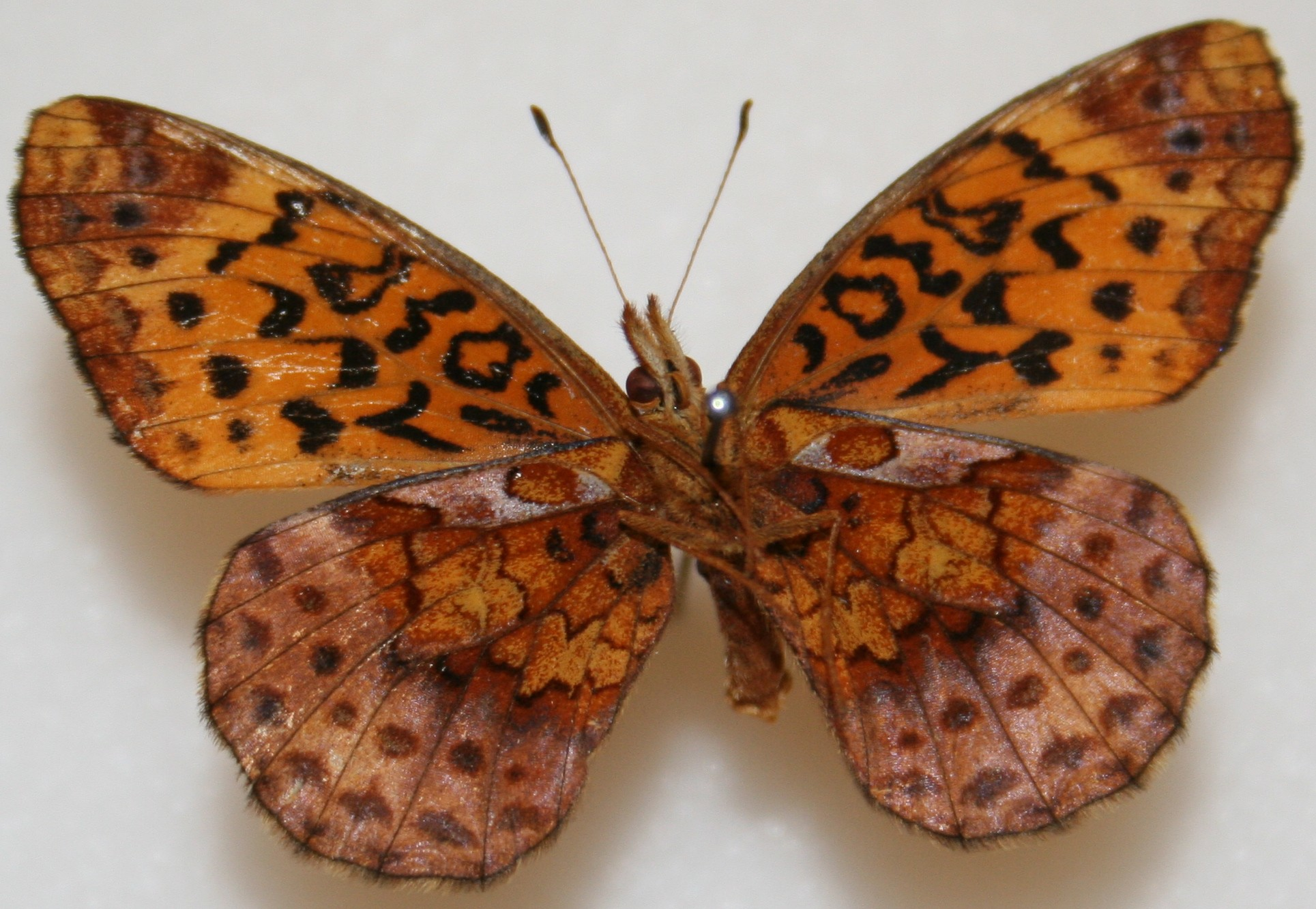
Underside of the wings

The upperside of the wings is yellow orange with dark spots, lines, and zigzagged bands. The forewing is squared off just below the apex. A dark border on the hindwing margin is lacking on most individuals. It has long palps. The underside of the wings is mottled with orange and purplish-brown. There is a yellowish band across the center of the hindwing. It lacks the silver spots most lesser fritillaries have. The forewing is smudged with orange and brown near the apex. The wingspan of the meadow fritillary is 3.5 - 5.1 cm (1 3/8 - 2 inches).

== Similar species ==
Similar species in the meadow fritillary's range include the silver-bordered fritillary (Boloria selene), the bog fritillary (Boloria eunomia) and the purplish fritillary (Boloria chariclea).

The silver-bordered fritillary has rounder wings than the meadow fritillary, a dark hindwing margin border and silver spots on the underside of the hindwing.

The bog fritillary is a bit smaller than the meadow fritillary, its wing bases are hairy and on the underside of the hindwing are a series of bands and patches that are rust red, yellow, and white.

The purplish fritillary is also a bit smaller than the meadow fritillary and the underside of the hindwings is a deep, rusty red.

== Habitat ==
The meadow fritillary is frequently encountered in wet, open places, including pastures, fields and streamsides.

== Life cycle ==
The female is the active flight partner. Females deposit greenish-yellow eggs near the host plant on twigs or leaves. Mature larvae are gray and black with small, light-colored spines. The chrysalis is yellow-brown. The meadow fritillary overwinters as a larva. It has one or two broods per year.

== Host plants ==
Host plants used by the meadow fritillary:

- Northern white violet, Viola pallens
- Common blue violet, Viola sororia

== Image gallery ==
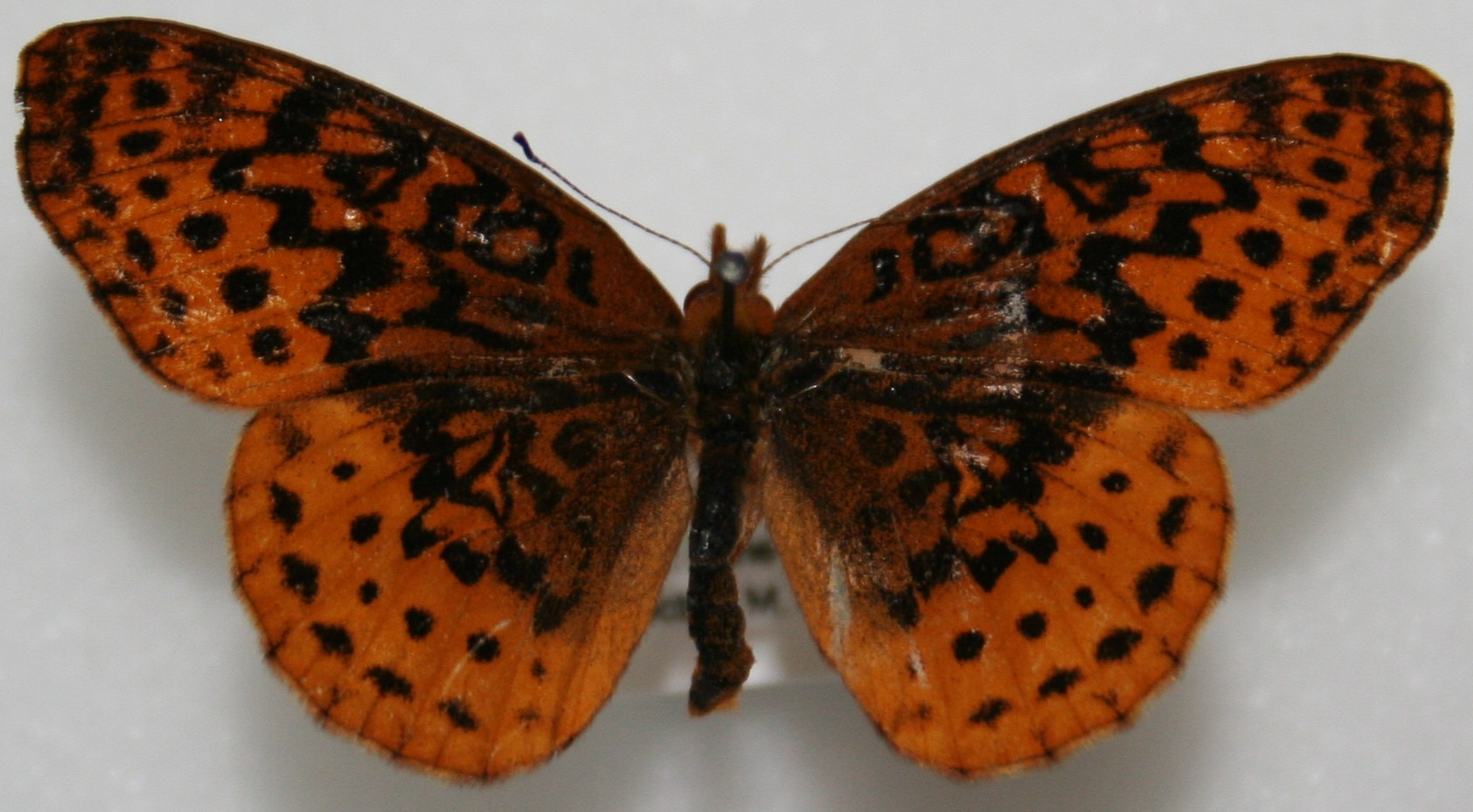
Upperside

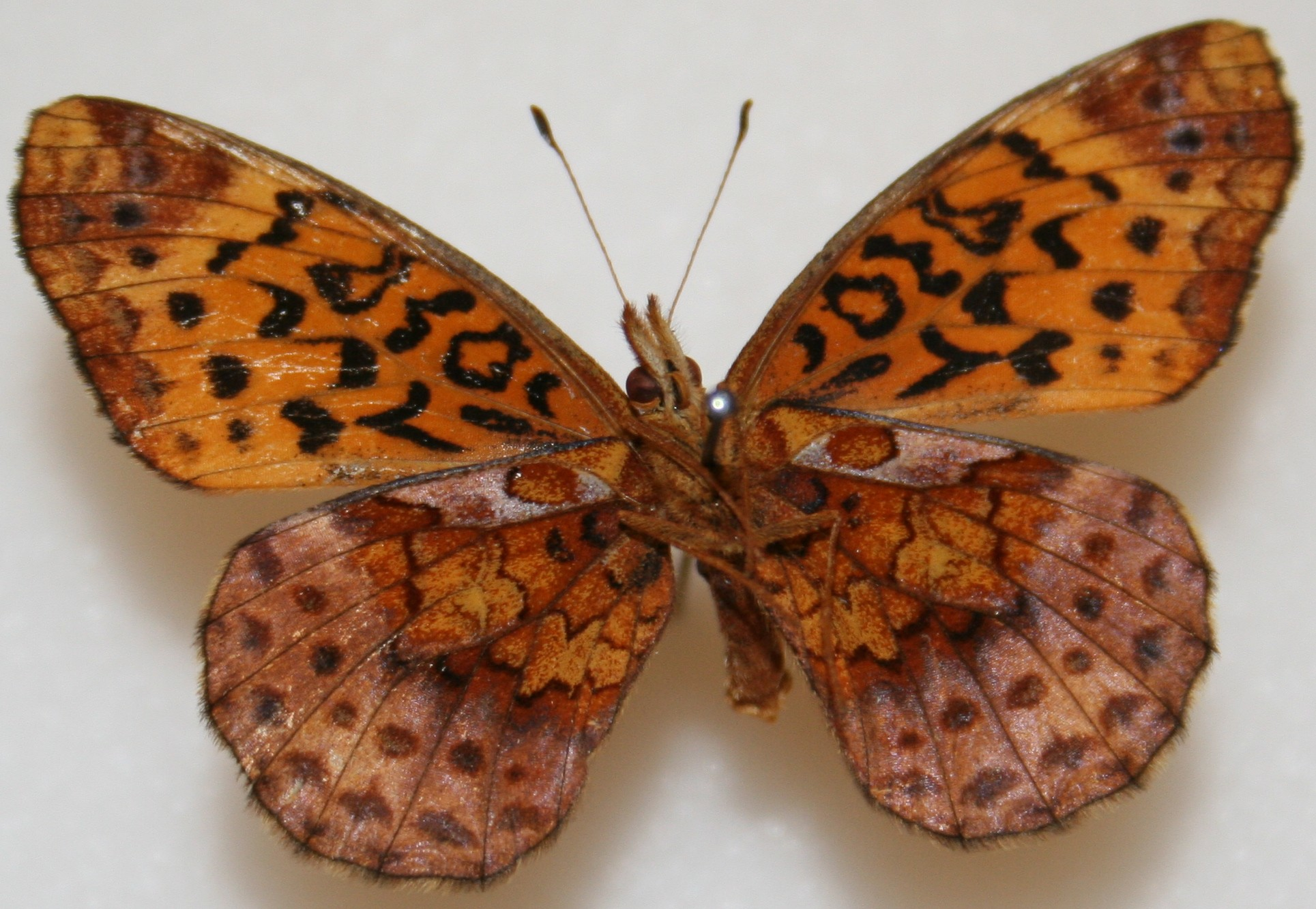
Underside

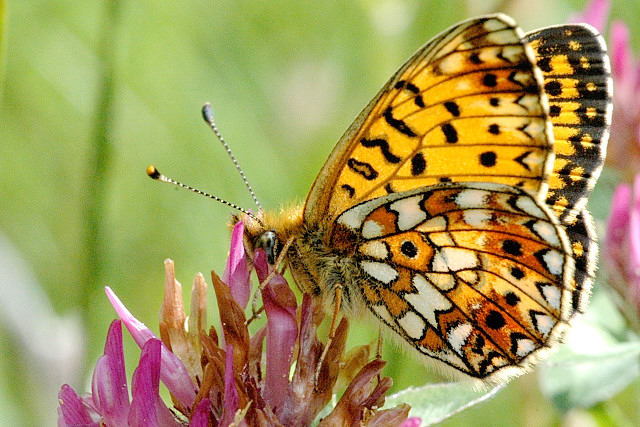
Underside of silver-bordered fritillary for comparison

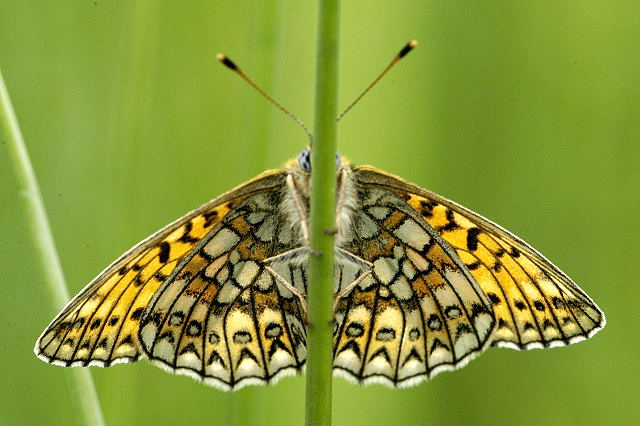
Underside of the bog fritillary for comparison
