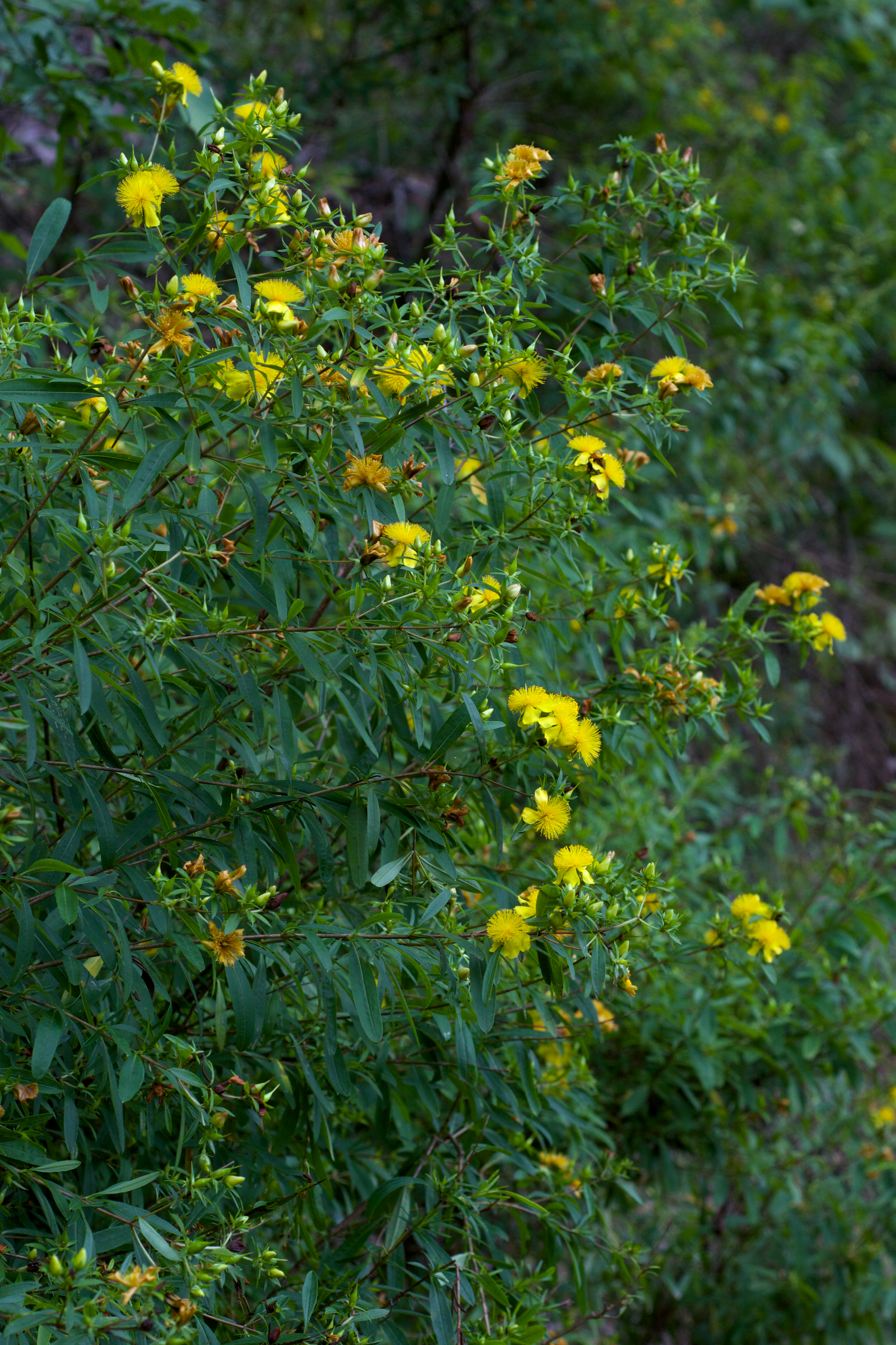

Conservation status
- Secure (NatureServe)

Scientific classification
- Kingdom: Plantae
- Clade: Tracheophytes
- Clade: Angiosperms
- Clade: Eudicots
- Clade: Rosids
- Order: Malpighiales
- Family: Hypericaceae
- Genus: Hypericum
- Section: H. sect. Myriandra
- Subsection: H. subsect. Centrosperma
- Species: H. prolificum

Binomial name
- Hypericum prolificum L.

= Hypericum prolificum =

Species of flowering plant in the St John's wort family

Hypericum prolificum, known as shrubby St. John's wort, is a deciduous shrub in the genus Hypericum. It was named for its "prolific" number of stamens.

== Description ==
Hypericum prolificum is a shrub growing up to 2 m (6 ft 7 in) tall with elliptic to oblanceolate leaves up to 70 mm (2.8 in) long and 15 mm (0.59 in) broad. The flowerheads have between 1 and 9 flowers, each 15–30 mm (0.59–1.18 in) across with 5 golden yellow petals and numerous stamens. The ovary is usually three-parted, though may have up to five parts in some individuals.

== Distribution and habitat ==
Hypericum prolificum is native to the central and eastern United States and Ontario. Habitats include riparian areas, slopes, thickets, swamp edges, and oak woodlands.

== Gallery ==
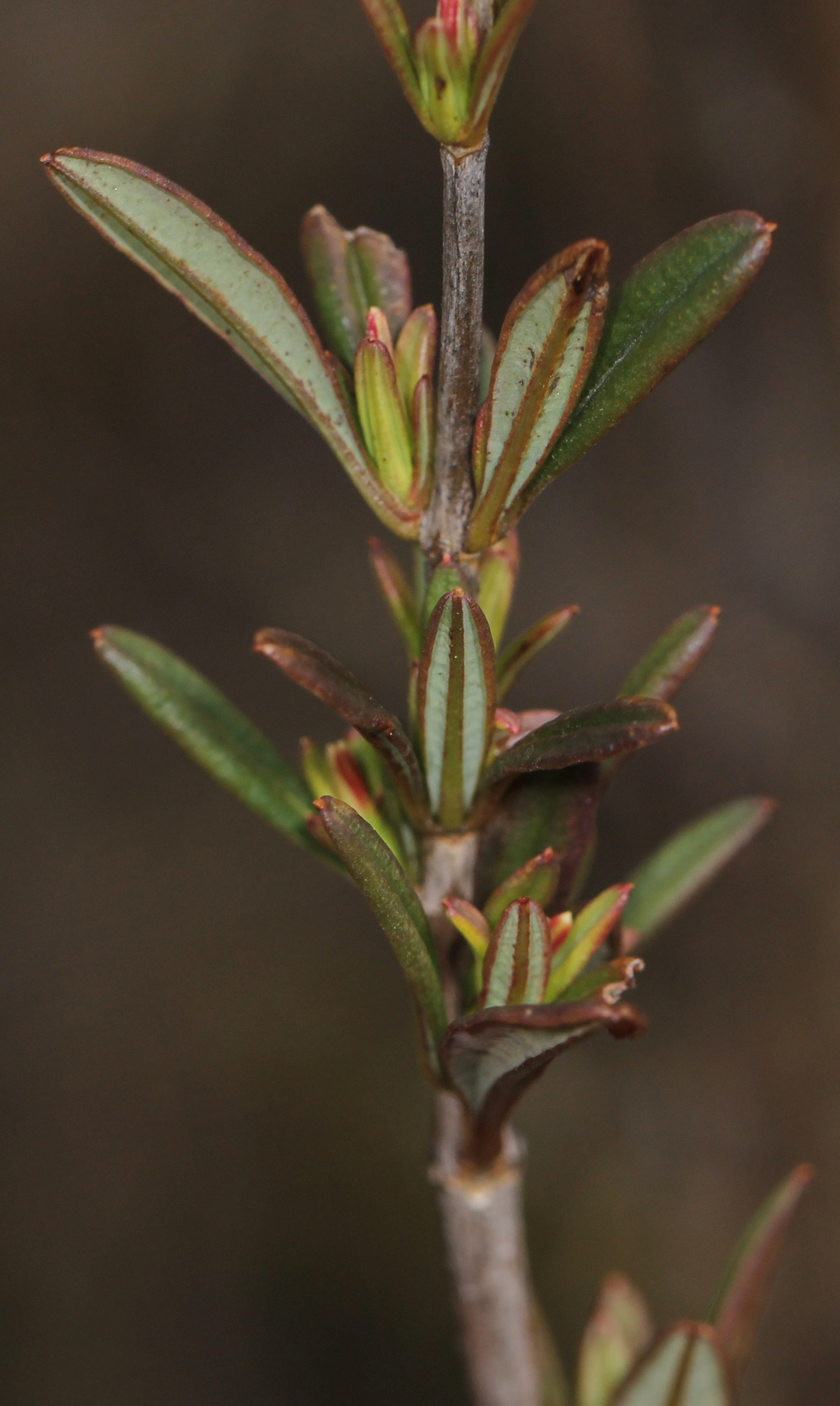
Young leaves emerging in early spring

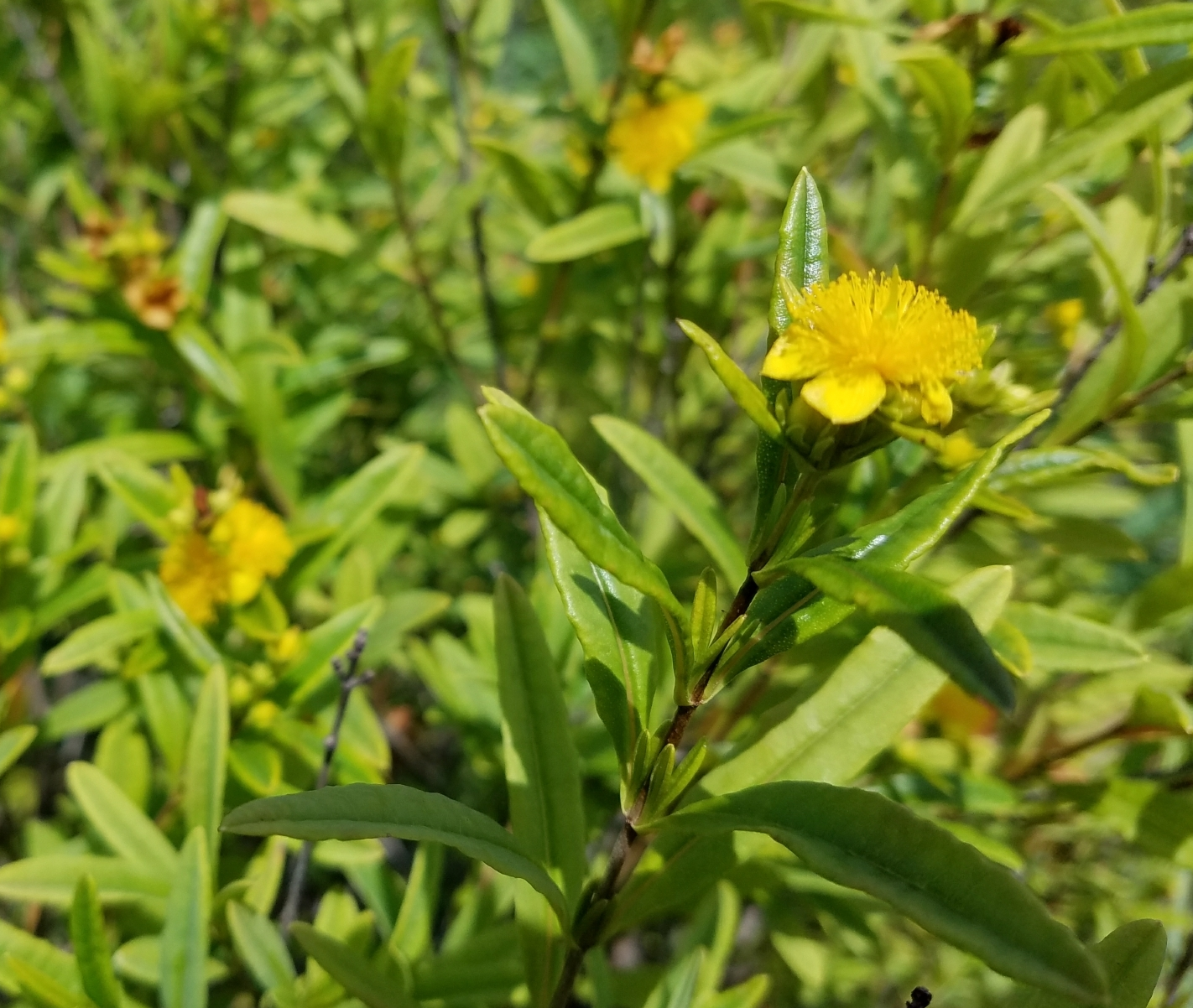
In flower

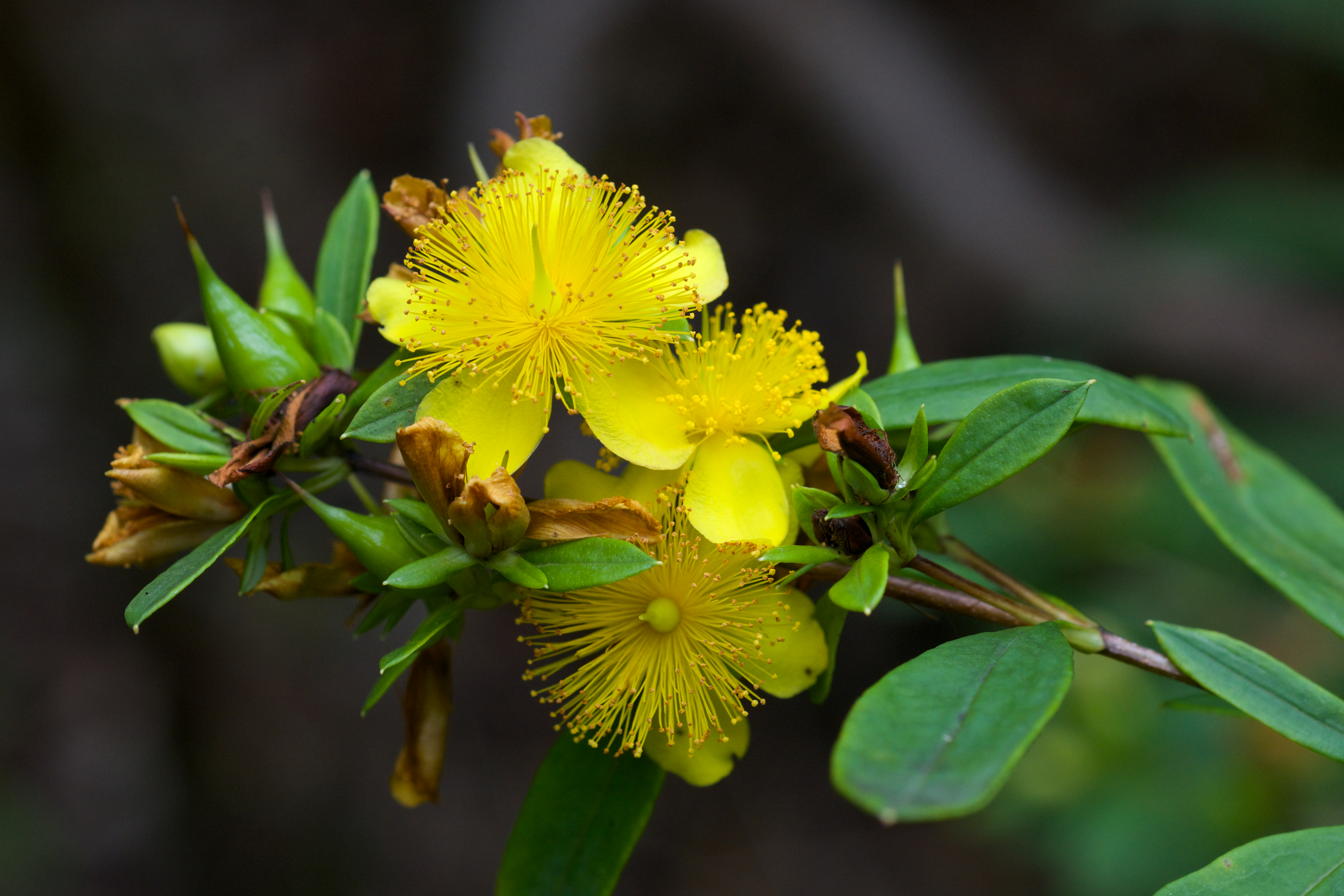
Flower and buds close-up

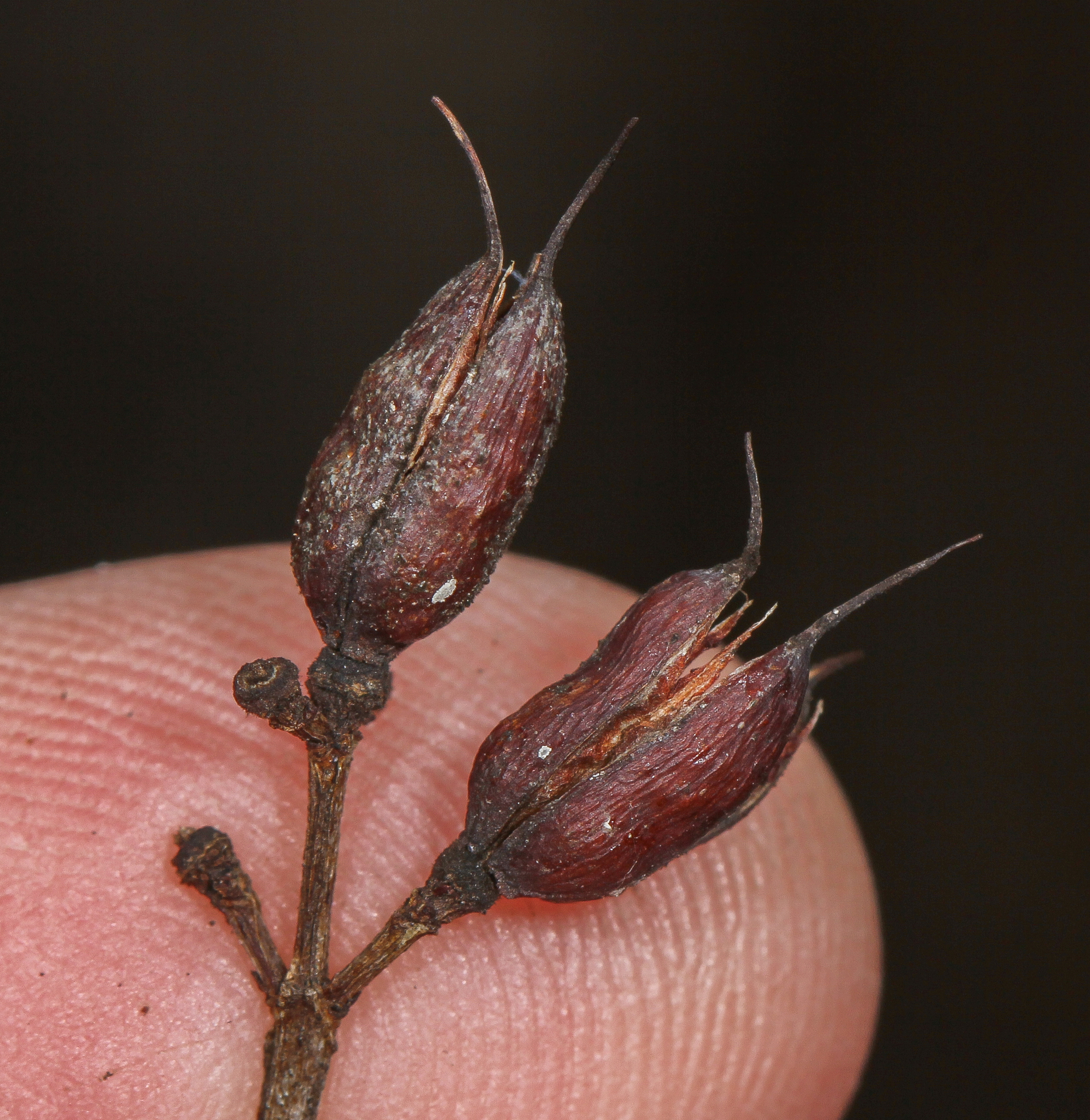
In fruit
