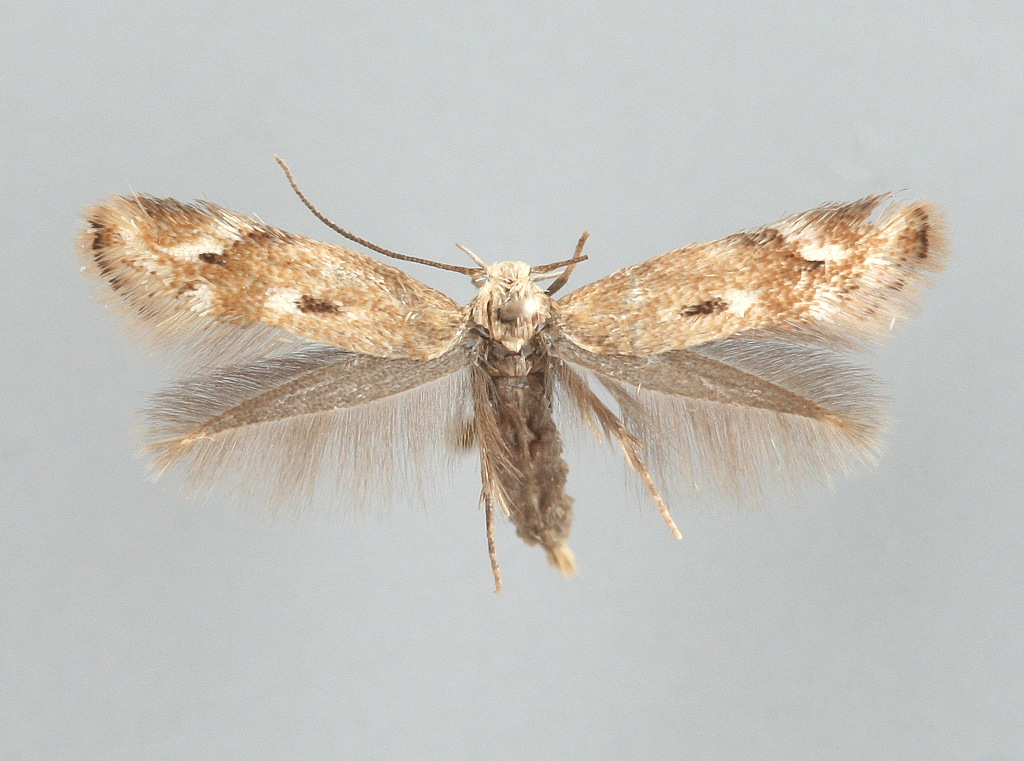
- Female

Scientific classification
- Domain: Eukaryota
- Kingdom: Animalia
- Phylum: Arthropoda
- Class: Insecta
- Order: Lepidoptera
- Family: Elachistidae
- Genus: Elachista
- Species: E. eleochariella

Binomial name
- Elachista eleochariella Stainton, 1851

Synonyms
- Biselachista eleochariella (Stainton, 1851)

= Elachista eleochariella =

Species of moth

Elachista eleochariella is a moth of the family Elachistidae found in Europe and North America.

== Description ==
The wingspan is 7–8 millimetres (0.28–0.31 in).The head is grey. Forewings are grey; plical stigma black, preceded and followed by whitish marks; a small tornal spot, and an oblique wedge-shaped mark on costa opposite whitish. Hindwings are dark grey.

The larvae feed on glaucous sedge (Carex flacca), carnation sedge (Carex panicea), black sedge (Carex nigra), common spike-rush (Eleocharis palustris) and common cottongrass (Eriophorum angustifolium). There is some confusion as to the form of the mine with a different description on the UKmoths website.

Pupation takes place outside of the mine.

== Distribution ==
In Europe it is found from northern Europe and northern Russia to the Pyrenees and Alps, and from Ireland to Romania. It is also found in North America.
