= Carex fumosimontana =

Scientific classification
- Kingdom: Plantae
- Clade: Tracheophytes
- Clade: Angiosperms
- Clade: Monocots
- Clade: Commelinids
- Order: Poales
- Family: Cyperaceae
- Genus: Carex
- Section: Carex sect. Phacocystis
- Species: C. fumosimontana

Binomial name
- Carex fumosimontana D.Estes

Species of grass-like plant

Carex fumosimontana, the Great Smoky Mountain sedge, is a species of sedge endemic to the Great Smoky Mountains in the southeastern United States. It was first formally described in 2013 by American botanist Dwayne Estes in Brittonia.

It is part of the Carex crinita complex within the section Carex sect. Phacocystis. It is a small complex of species characterized in part by their thick, pendulous spikes, rough, three-veined pistillate scales, leaves over 2 mm in width, and ladder-fibrillose sheathes. Carex fumosimontana is most similar to Carex gynandra, but can be distinguished from other species in this complex by a combination of the following characters: dark reddish brown pistillate scales, reddish sheaths, elliptical rather than ovate perigynia, and smooth or minutely papillose perigynia.

Carex fumosimontana occurs in openings within the spruce-fir forests of the Great Smoky Mountains in North Carolina and Tennessee. It is found in mesic sedge meadows and seeps at the edge of rock outcrops. The name is from the Latin for "smoky" and "mountain", in reference to the type locality.
