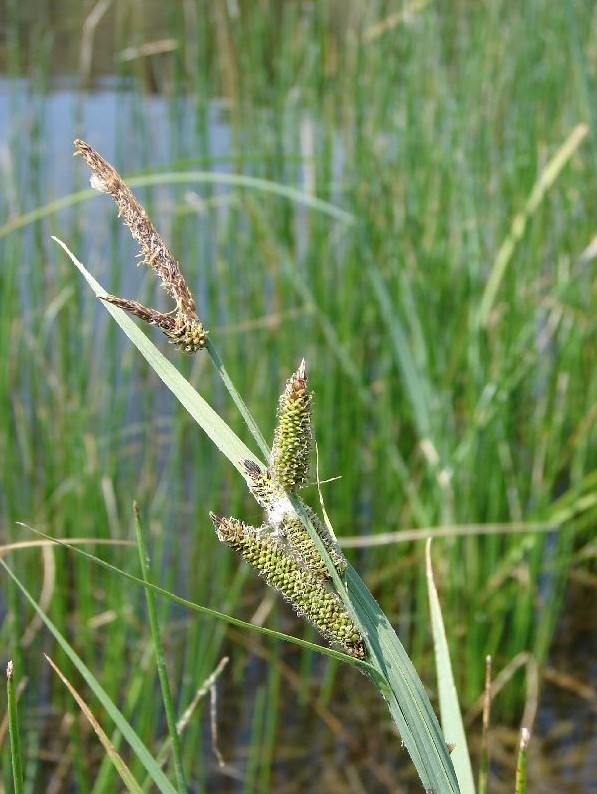

Conservation status
- Least Concern (IUCN 3.1)

Scientific classification
- Kingdom: Plantae
- Clade: Tracheophytes
- Clade: Angiosperms
- Clade: Monocots
- Clade: Commelinids
- Order: Poales
- Family: Cyperaceae
- Genus: Carex
- Subgenus: Carex subg. Carex
- Section: Carex sect. Phacocystis
- Species: C. nebrascensis

Binomial name
- Carex nebrascensis Dewey

Synonyms
- List: Carex jamesii var. nebrascensis (Dewey) L.H.Bailey; Carex jamesii var. ultriformis (L.H.Bailey) Kük.; Carex nebrascensis var. eruciformis Suksd.; Carex nebrascensis var. praevia L.H.Bailey; Carex nebrascensis var. ultriformis L.H.Bailey

= Carex nebrascensis =

Species of sedge

Carex nebrascensis is a species of sedge commonly known as Nebraska sedge.

== Description ==
Carex nebrascensis produces upright, angled, spongy stems up to about 90 centimeters tall. The waxy, bluish leaves form tufts around the base of each stem. The root system is a very dense network of rhizomes. The inflorescence includes a few narrow staminate spikes above some wider pistillate spikes on short peduncles. The fruit is covered in a tough, slightly inflated sac called a perigynium which sometimes has a pattern of red spotting.

== Distribution and habitat ==
This sedge is native to the central and Western United States and north into central Canada. It grows in wetlands at various elevations, including the Sierra Nevada and Mojave Desert sky islands. Carex nebrascensis tolerates alkaline soils and submersion for long periods of time.

== Uses ==
Uses for this sedge, Carex nebrascensis, include:

- Forage for livestock and wildlife
- Ornamental grass ("grasslike") plant in natural, native plant, and habitat gardens
- Erosion control and soil compaction remediation.
- Restoration ecology
  - Riparian zone restoration
  - Stream restoration
  - Wetland restoration
- Phytoremediation in natural and constructed wetlands for wastewater treatment by bioremediation.
