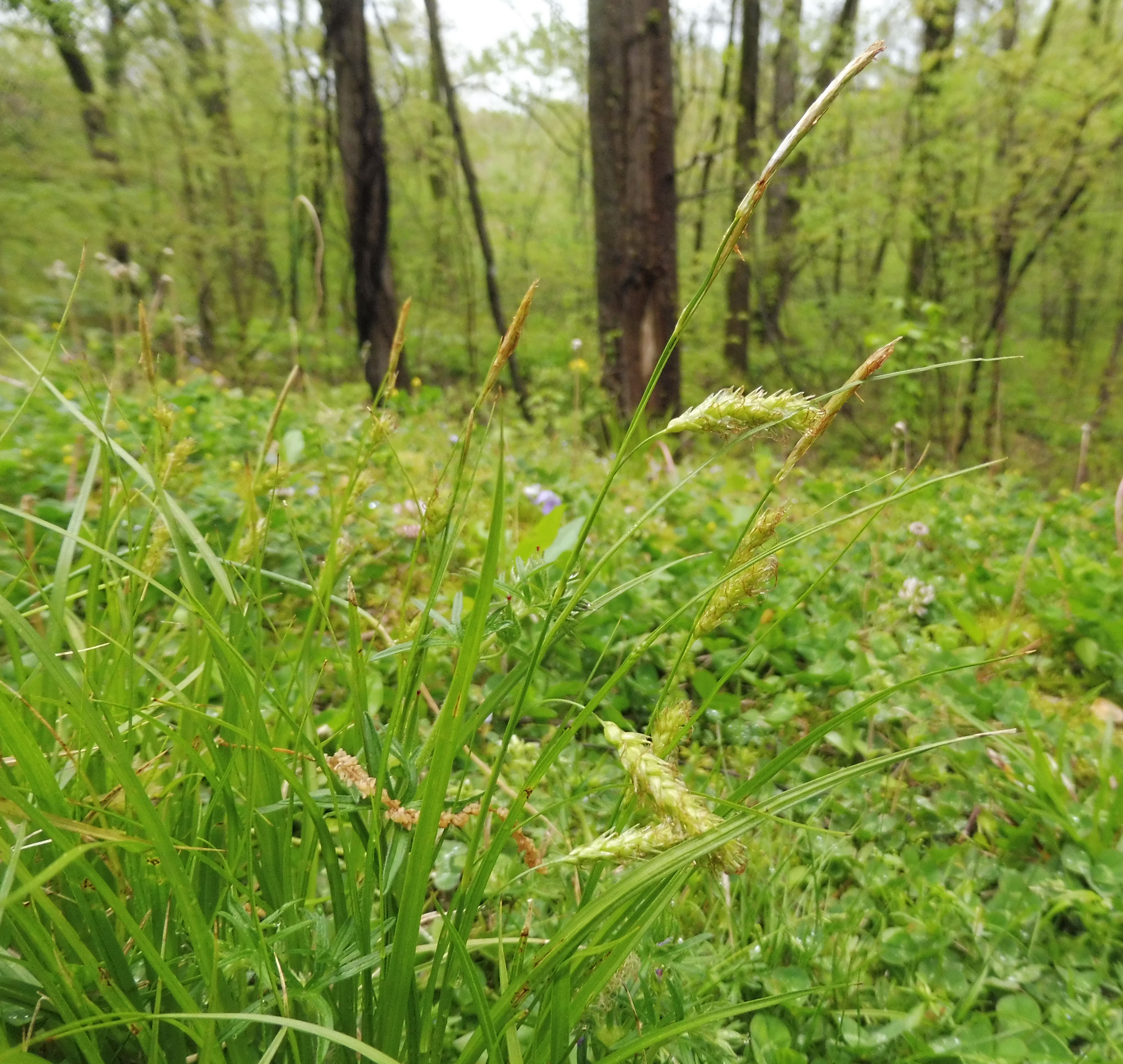

Scientific classification
- Kingdom: Plantae
- Clade: Tracheophytes
- Clade: Angiosperms
- Clade: Monocots
- Clade: Commelinids
- Order: Poales
- Family: Cyperaceae
- Genus: Carex
- Subgenus: Carex subg. Carex
- Section: Carex sect. Hymenochlaenae
- Species: C. cherokeensis

Binomial name
- Carex cherokeensis Schwein.

= Carex cherokeensis =

Species of grass-like plant

Carex cherokeensis, commonly called Cherokee sedge, is a species of flowering plant in the sedge family (Cyperaceae). It is native to the United States where it is found in the Southeast. Its natural habitat is in high-nutrient, often calcareous soil, in bottomland forests, mesic forests, and wet meadows.

Carex cherokeensis is a rhizomatous perennial graminoid. It has drooping spikes which are 8–9 mm thick. Its perigynium beaks are papery and fragile. It produces fruits in late spring and early summer.
