= Carex truncata =

Carex truncata can refer to the following plant species:

- Carex truncata Boeckeler, a synonym of Carex laxiflora Lam.
- Carex truncata Fenzl, a synonym of Carex flacca Schreb. subsp. flacca
