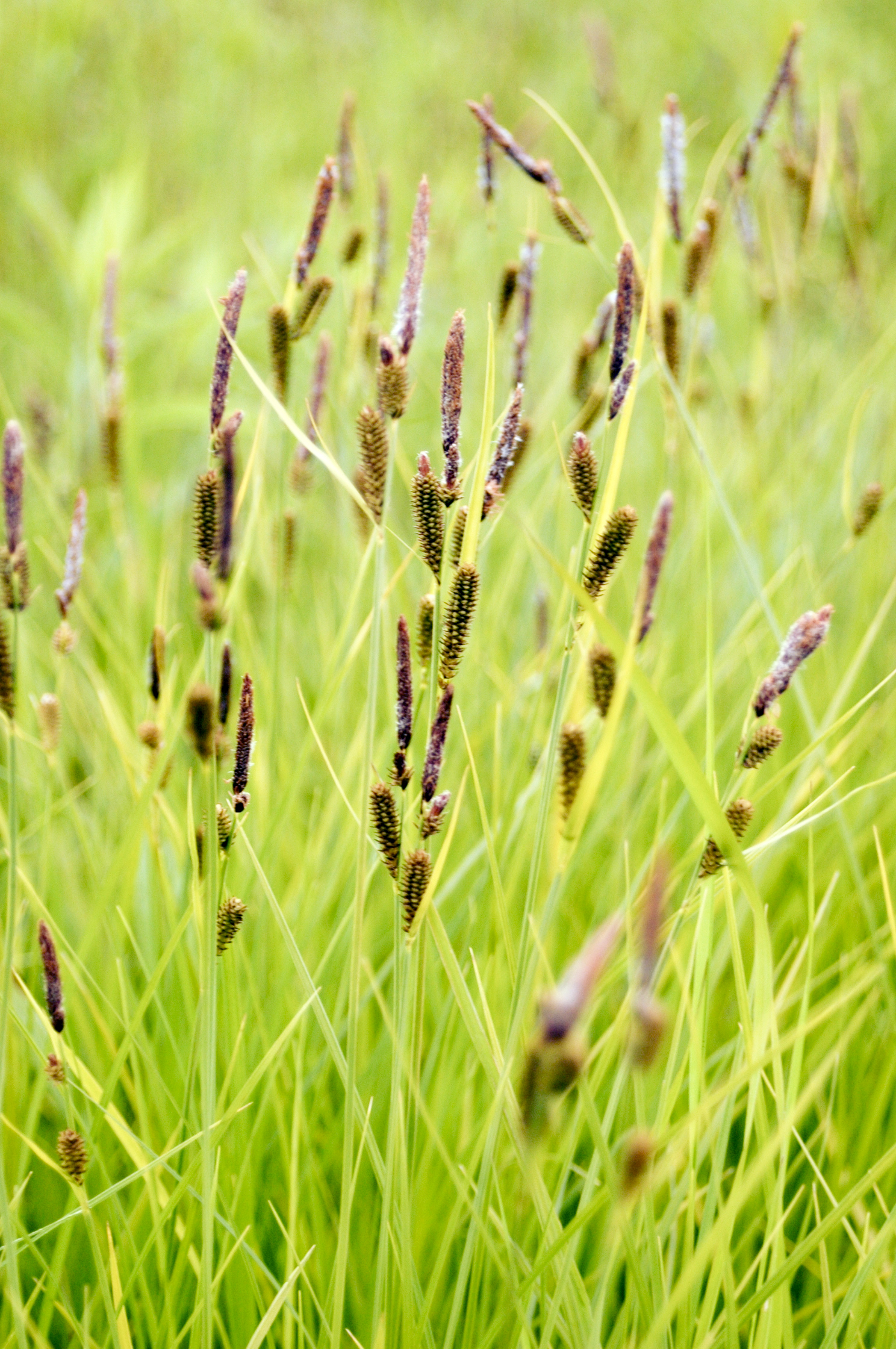

Conservation status
- Secure (NatureServe)

Scientific classification
- Kingdom: Plantae
- Clade: Embryophytes
- Clade: Tracheophytes
- Clade: Spermatophytes
- Clade: Angiosperms
- Clade: Monocots
- Clade: Commelinids
- Order: Poales
- Family: Cyperaceae
- Genus: Carex
- Subgenus: Carex subg. Carex
- Section: Carex sect. Phacocystis
- Species: C. stricta

Binomial name
- Carex stricta Lam.

Synonyms
- Carex elata Gooden.; Carex strictior Dewey

= Carex stricta =

Species of grass-like plant

Carex stricta is a species of sedge known by the common names upright sedge and tussock sedge. The plant grows in moist marshes, forests and alongside bodies of water. It grows up to 2 feet (0.61 m) tall and 2 feet (0.61 m) wide. When the leaves die, they build on top of or around the living plant, making a "tussock". Widely distributed in and east of the Great Plains, it is one of the most common wetland sedges in eastern North America.

Their seeds are carried by the wind. When seeds land, they are eaten by birds such as dark-eyed junco, northern cardinal, wild turkey, and ducks such as mallard and wood duck. The seeds are also eaten by squirrels and other mammals. The plant can also reproduce vegetatively via rhizomes, and often form colonies.

It is a larval host to the black dash, the dun skipper, the eyed brown, and the mulberry wing.
