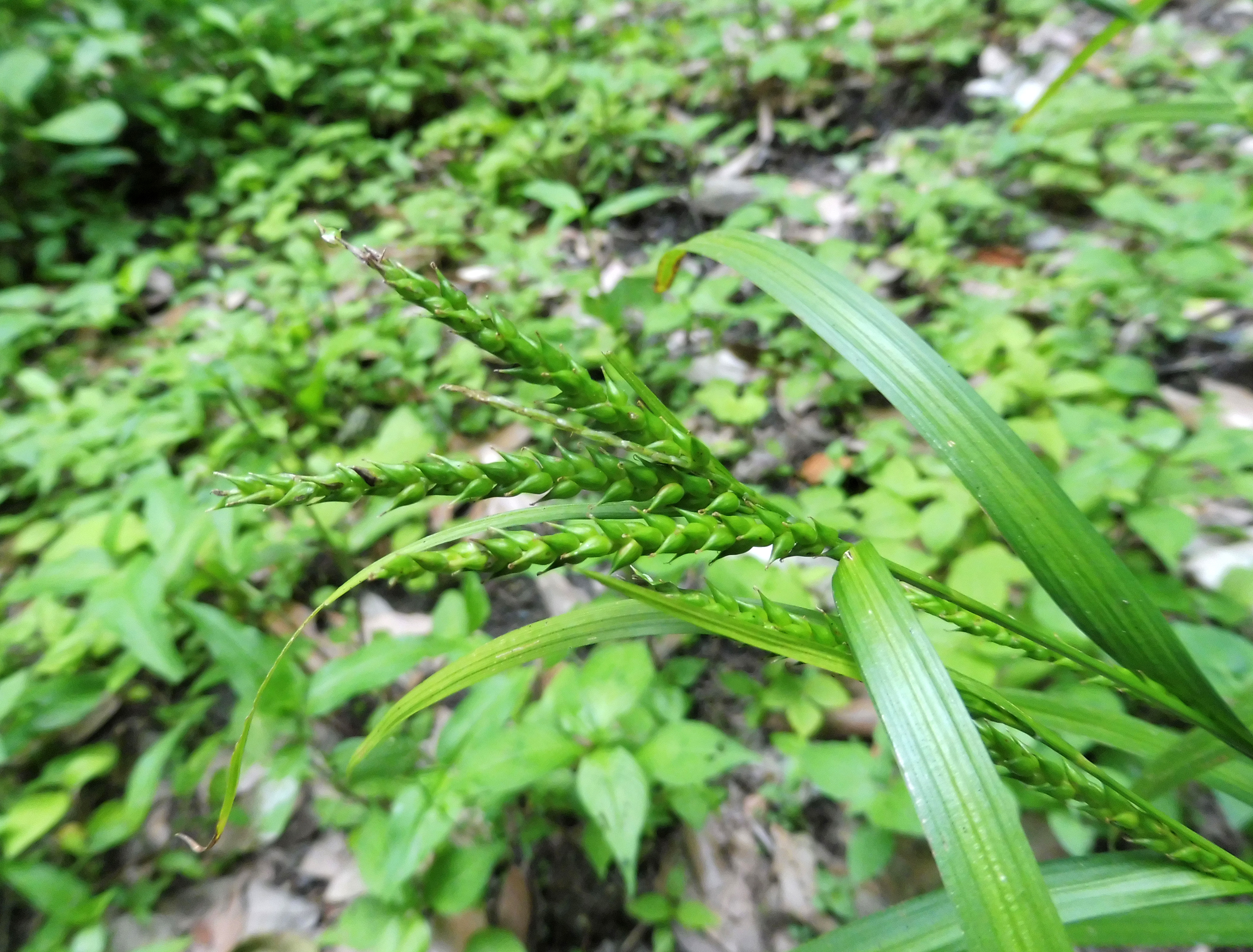

Scientific classification
- Kingdom: Plantae
- Clade: Embryophytes
- Clade: Tracheophytes
- Clade: Angiosperms
- Clade: Monocots
- Clade: Commelinids
- Order: Poales
- Family: Cyperaceae
- Genus: Carex
- Subgenus: Carex subg. Carex
- Section: Carex sect. Confertiflorae
- Species: C. ischnostachya

Binomial name
- Carex ischnostachya Steudel

= Carex ischnostachya =

Species of grass-like plant

Carex ischnostachya is an herbaceous graminoid plant in the sedge family (Cyperaceae). It is native to eastern Asia, where it is found in China, Japan, and Korea. Its natural habitat is in forest openings in wet areas, in hills or mountains. It is a common species, and is often found along roadsides or trails.

== Description ==
Carex ischnostachya is a rhizomatous perennial. It can be distinguished from other Carex in section Confertiflorae by its short, awnless, and broadly ovate female glumes, in combination with its sub-erect perigynia. It produces flowers and fruits from April to June.
