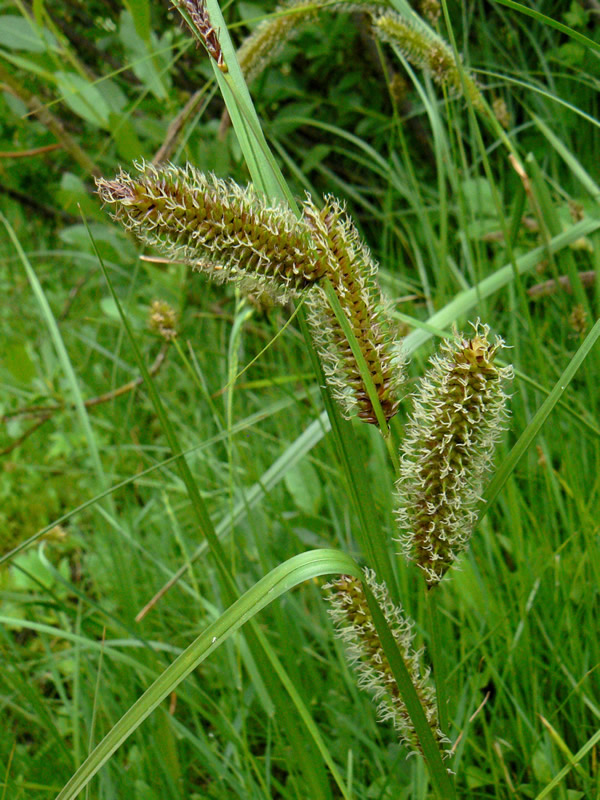

Conservation status
- Least Concern (IUCN 3.1)

- Secure (NatureServe)

Scientific classification
- Kingdom: Plantae
- Clade: Tracheophytes
- Clade: Angiosperms
- Clade: Monocots
- Clade: Commelinids
- Order: Poales
- Family: Cyperaceae
- Genus: Carex
- Section: Carex sect. Phacocystis
- Species: C. aquatilis

Binomial name
- Carex aquatilis Wahlenb.

= Carex aquatilis =

Species of plant

Carex aquatilis is a species of sedge known as water sedge and leafy tussock sedge. It has a circumboreal distribution, occurring throughout the northern reaches of the Northern Hemisphere. It grows in many types of mountainous and arctic habitat, including temperate coniferous forest, alpine meadows, tundra, and wetlands.

There are several varieties of this species, and it is somewhat variable in appearance. It produces triangular stems reaching heights between 20 cm (8 in) and 1.5 m (5 ft), and generally does not form clumps as some other sedges do. It grows from a dense rhizome network which produces a mat of fine roots thick enough to form sod, and includes aerenchyma to allow the plant to survive in low-oxygen substrates like heavy mud. The inflorescence bears a number of spikes with one leaflike bract at the base which is longer than the inflorescence itself. The fruits are glossy achenes, and although the plant occasionally reproduces by seed, most of the time it reproduces vegetatively, spreading via its rhizome. In fact, in any given year, most shoots produce no flowers. This perennial plant lives up to 10 years or more, can form peat as its rhizome system decomposes, and is sometimes used to revegetate areas where peat has been harvested.
