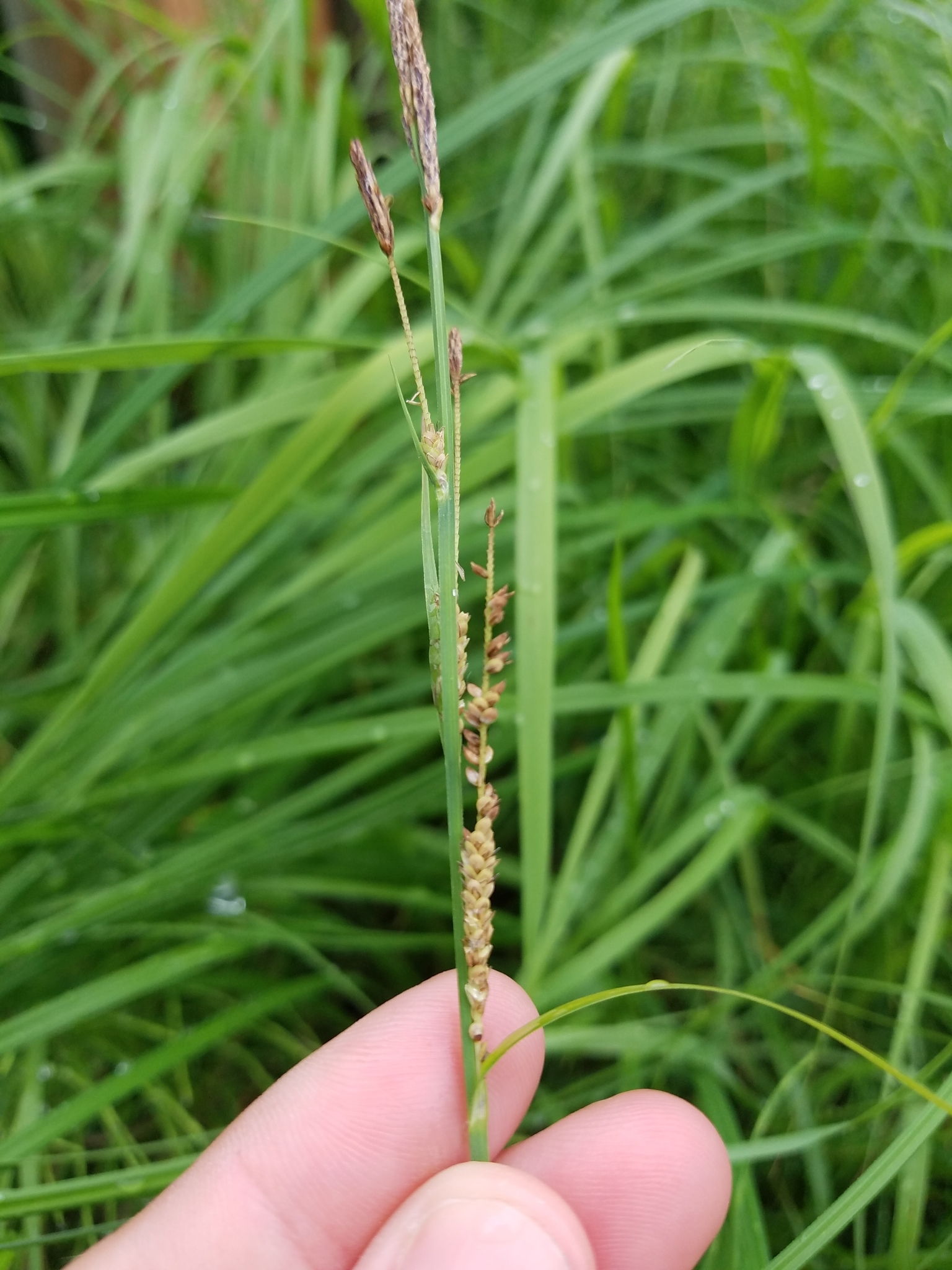

Conservation status
- Least Concern (IUCN 3.1)

Scientific classification
- Kingdom: Plantae
- Clade: Tracheophytes
- Clade: Angiosperms
- Clade: Monocots
- Clade: Commelinids
- Order: Poales
- Family: Cyperaceae
- Genus: Carex
- Subgenus: Carex subg. Carex
- Section: Carex sect. Phacocystis
- Species: C. emoryi

Binomial name
- Carex emoryi Dewey

= Carex emoryi =

Species of grass-like plant

Carex emoryi, the riverbank tussock sedge or Emory's sedge, is a species of sedge native to Canada, the United States, and the states of Chihuahua and Coahuila in northern Mexico.

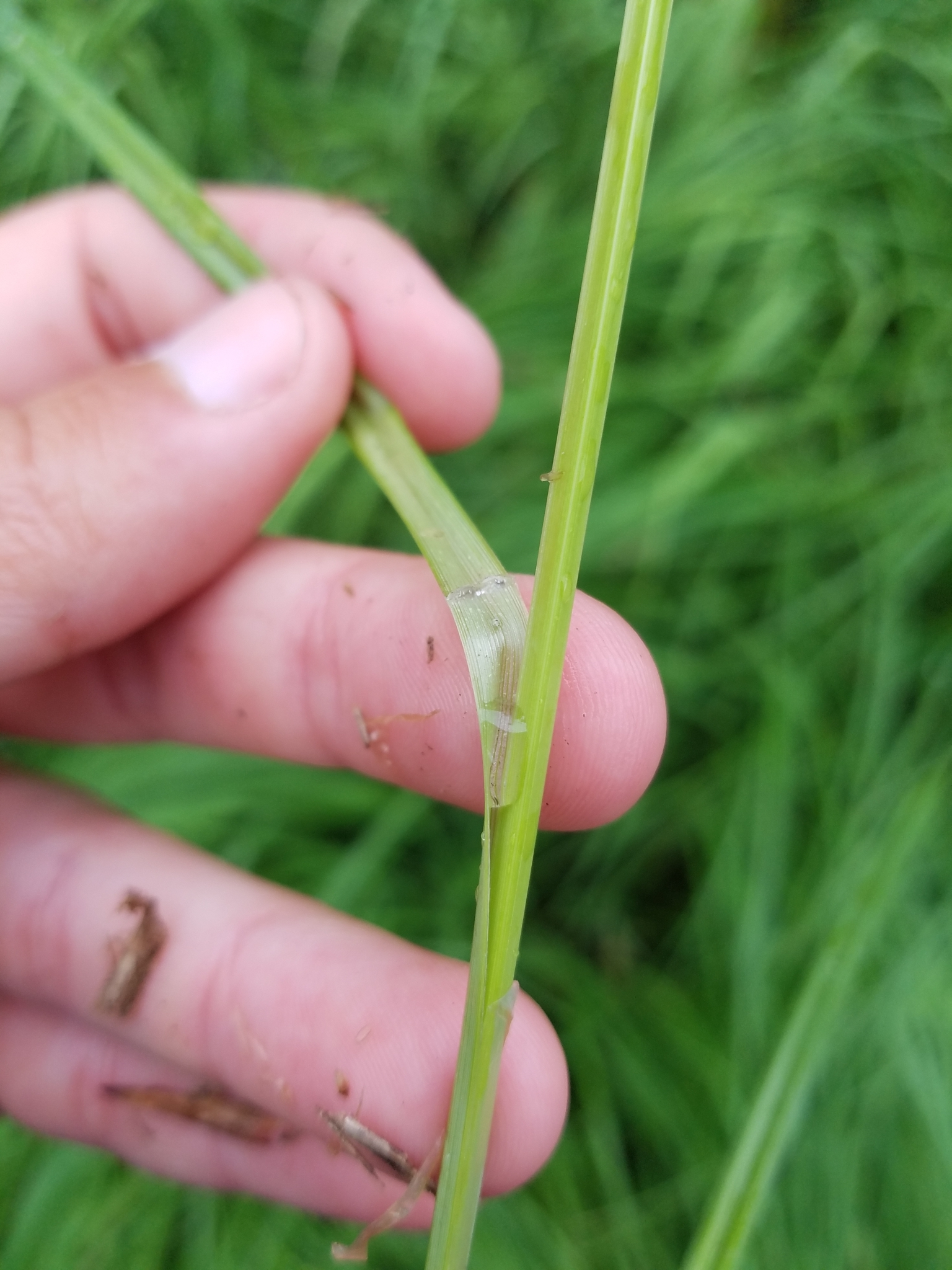
Distinctive truncate ligule of Carex emoryi

It grows along the banks of rivers and streams. It also occurs on sand and gravel bars in streams. It spreads by means of underground rhizomes. Carex emoryi is sometimes planted in retention ponds for erosion prevention and maintenance reduction along shorelines.
