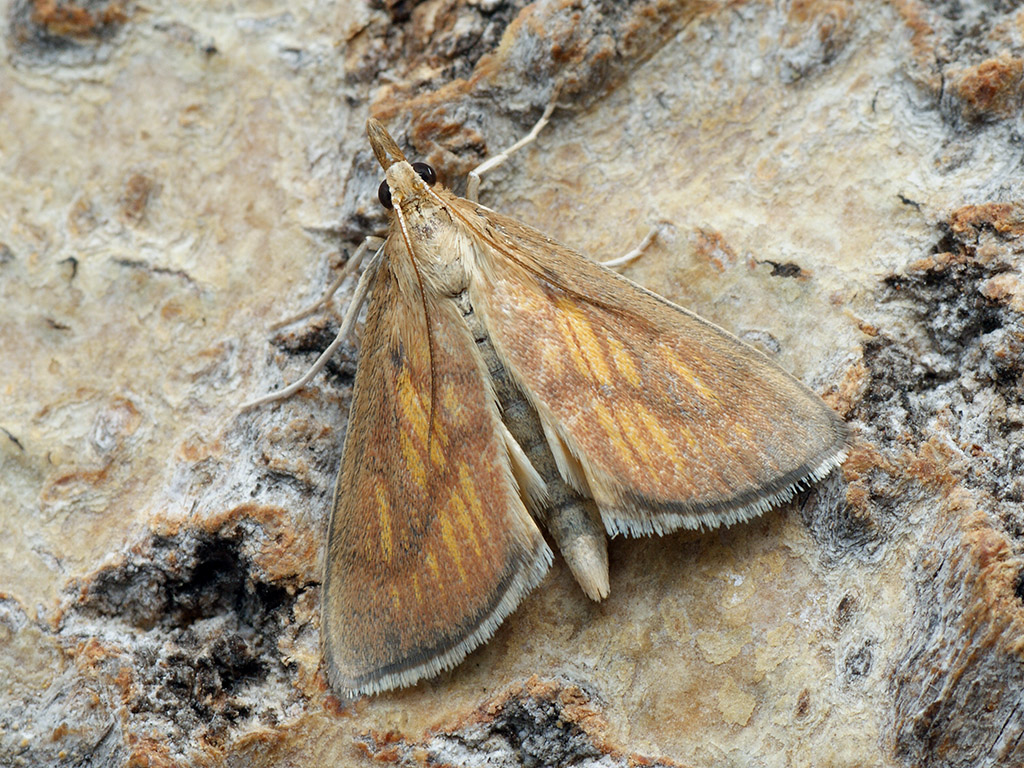

Scientific classification
- Domain: Eukaryota
- Kingdom: Animalia
- Phylum: Arthropoda
- Class: Insecta
- Order: Lepidoptera
- Family: Crambidae
- Genus: Nascia
- Species: N. cilialis

Binomial name
- Nascia cilialis (Hübner, 1796)

Synonyms
- Pyralis cilialis Hübner, 1796; Botys venosalis Nolcken, 1848; Nascia cilialis christophi Munroe & Mutuura, 1968; Nascia cilialis kumatai Munroe & Mutuura, 1968; Pyrausta cilialis var. simplalis Caradja, 1916; Pyrausta virgata Reutti, 1853; Nascia cilialis virgatalis (Christoph, 1881)

= Nascia cilialis =

Species of moth

Nascia cilialis, the orange-rayed pearl, is a moth of the family Crambidae. It is found from southern and central Europe to Japan.

The wingspan is 24–27 mm. Adults are on wing from June to July.

The larvae feed on greater pond sedge (Carex riparia) and sometimes other sedges.
