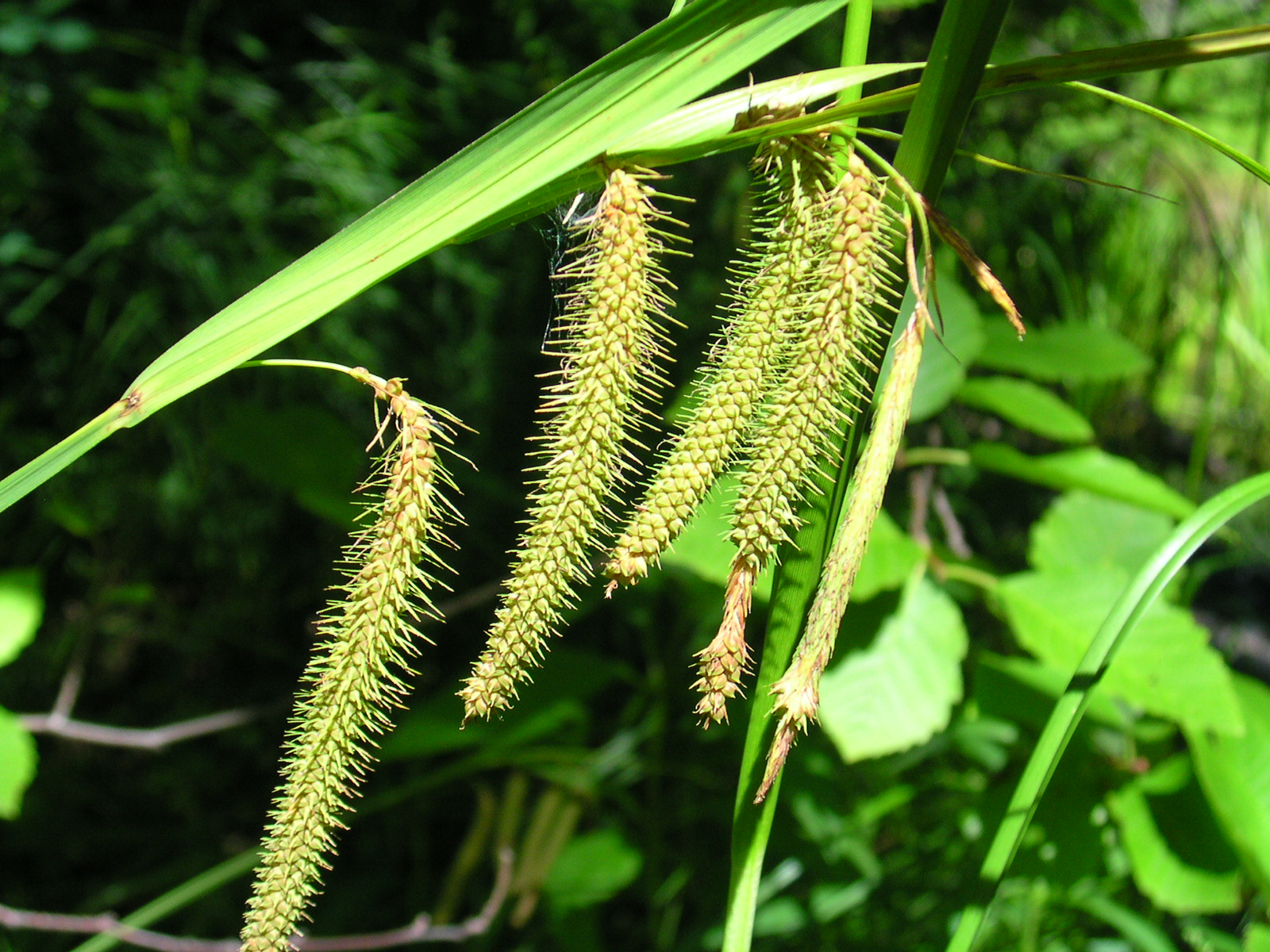

Scientific classification
- Kingdom: Plantae
- Clade: Tracheophytes
- Clade: Angiosperms
- Clade: Monocots
- Clade: Commelinids
- Order: Poales
- Family: Cyperaceae
- Genus: Carex
- Section: Carex sect. Phacocystis
- Species: C. crinita

Binomial name
- Carex crinita Lam.

Synonyms
- Diemisa crinita (Lam.) Raf.; Neskiza crinita (Lam.) Raf.

= Carex crinita =

Species of flowering plant

Carex crinita, called fringed sedge, is a species of flowering plant in the genus Carex, native to central and eastern Canada and the central and eastern United States. It is the namesake of the Carex crinita species complex.

== Subtaxa ==
The following varieties are currently accepted:

- Carex crinita var. brevicrinis Fernald
- Carex crinita var. crinita
- Carex crinita var. porteri (Olney) Fernald
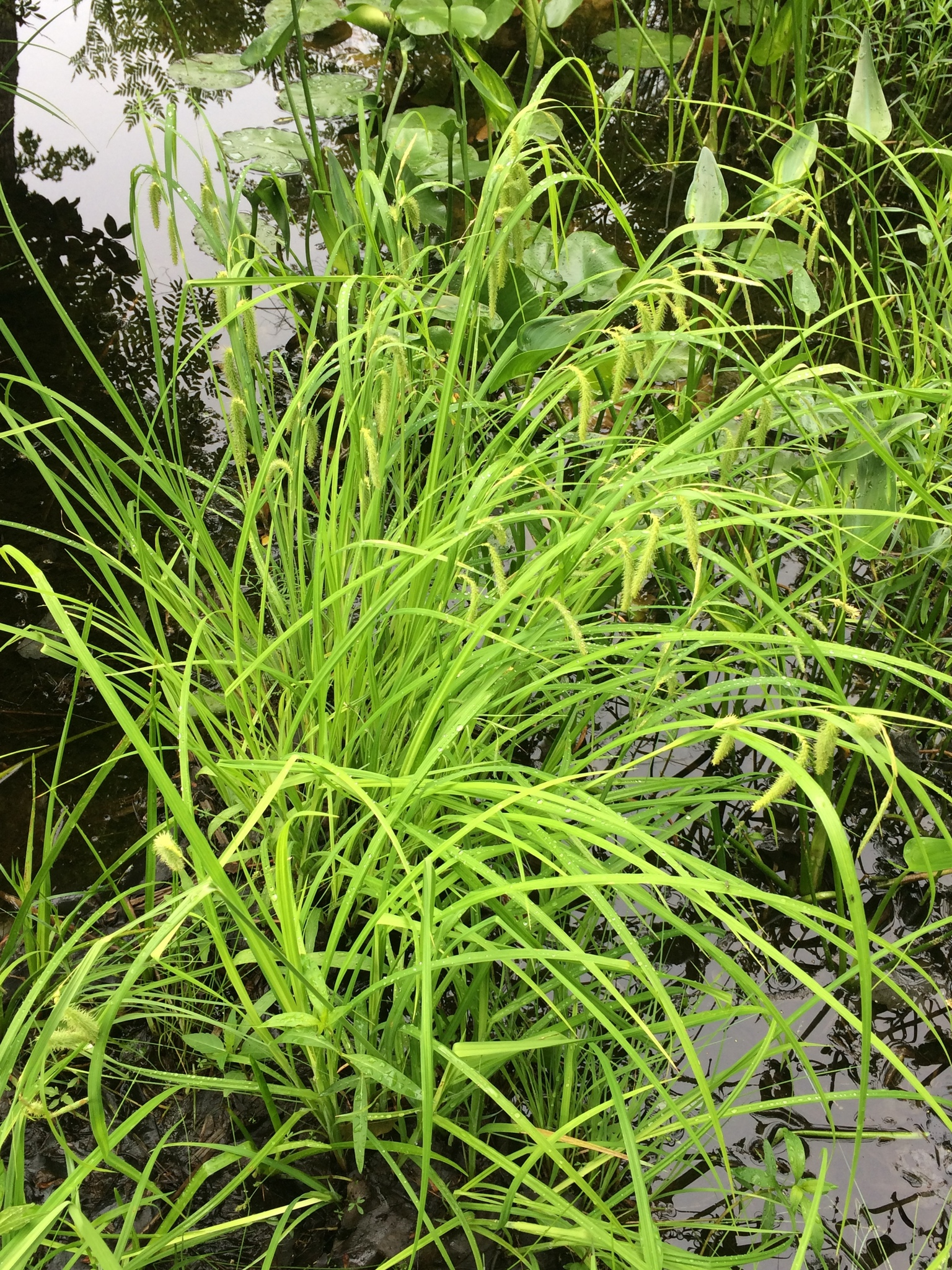
Form

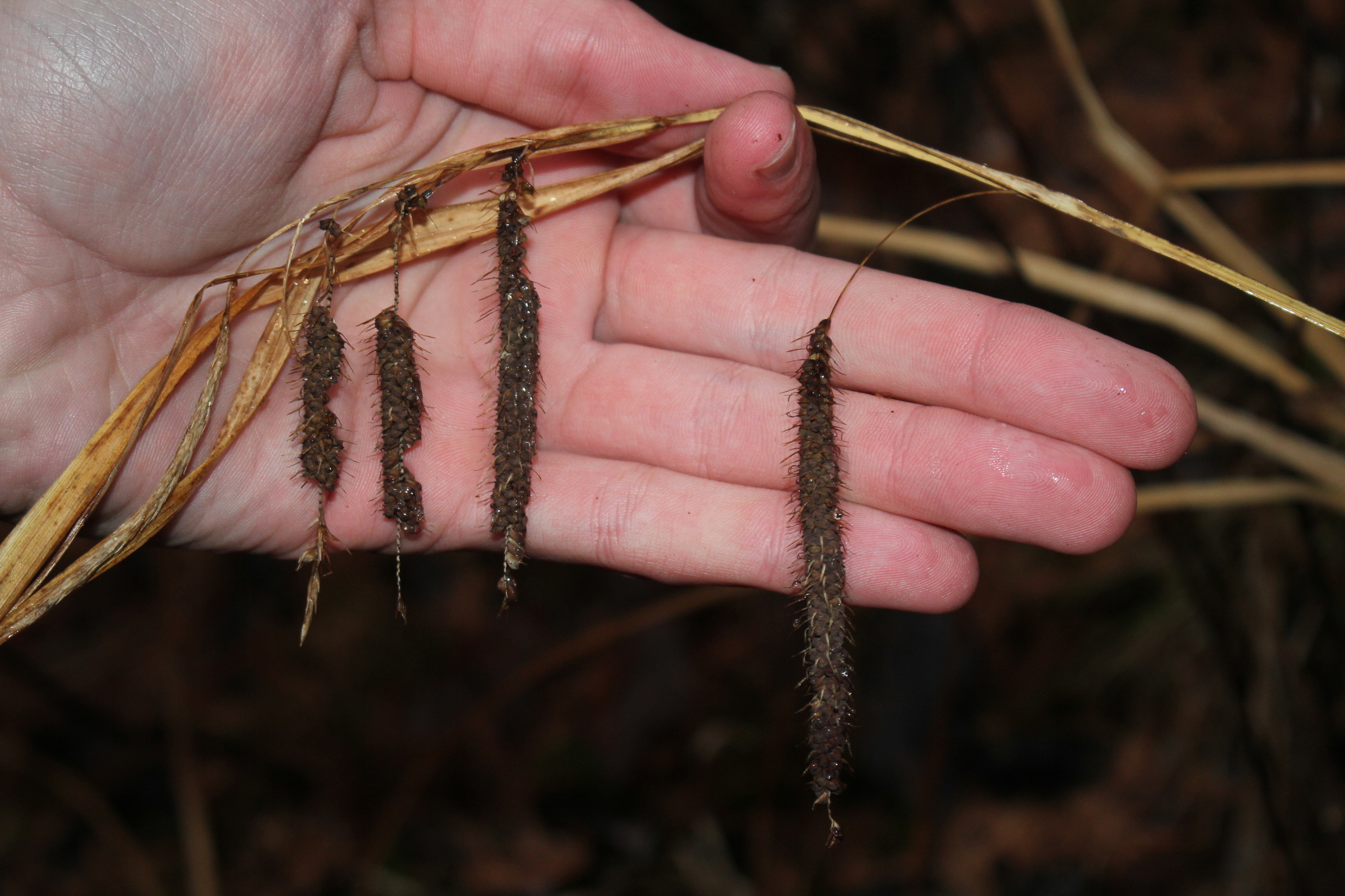
Fruiting

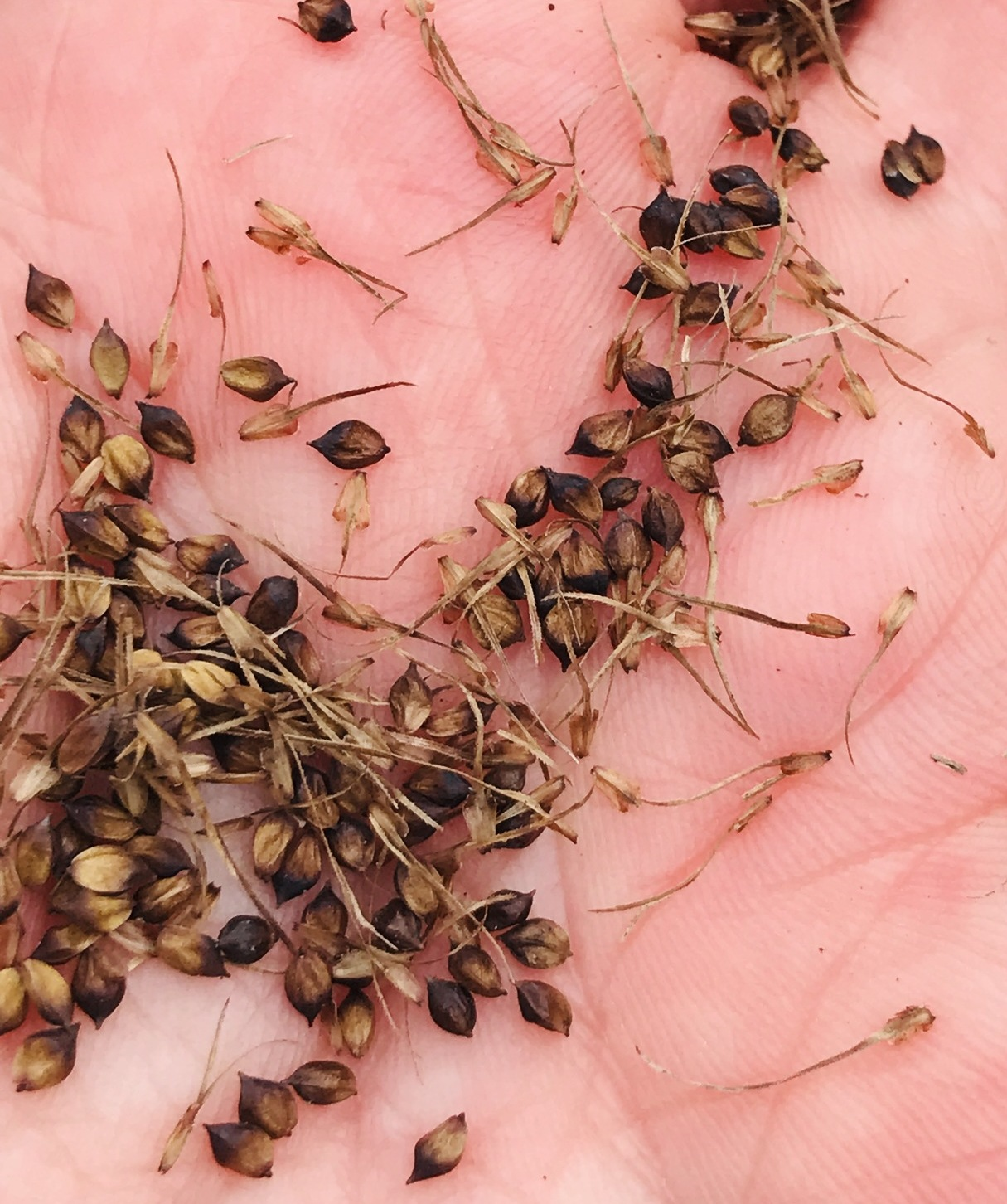
Perigynia (brown) and scales (straw-colored, with awns)
