= C. emoryi =

C. emoryi may refer to:

- Carex emoryi, the riverbank tussock sedge or Emory's sedge, a plant species
- Castela emoryi, the Crucifixion thorn, a shrub species native to the Mojave and Sonoran Deserts
- Condea emoryi, the desert lavender
