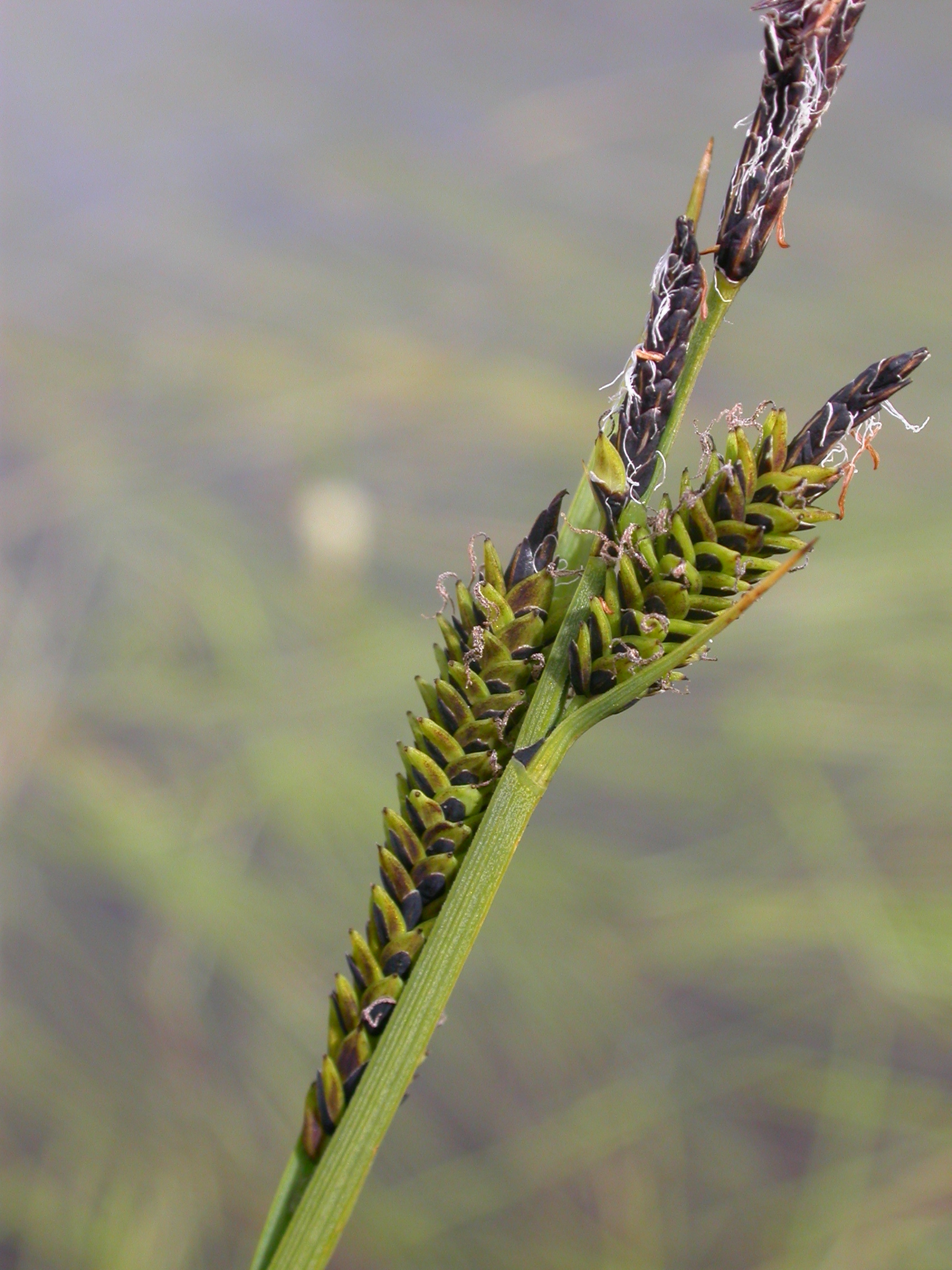

Conservation status
- Least Concern (IUCN 3.1)

- Secure (NatureServe)

Scientific classification
- Kingdom: Plantae
- Clade: Tracheophytes
- Clade: Angiosperms
- Clade: Monocots
- Clade: Commelinids
- Order: Poales
- Family: Cyperaceae
- Genus: Carex
- Subgenus: Carex subg. Carex
- Section: Carex sect. Phacocystis
- Species: C. nigra

Binomial name
- Carex nigra (L.) Reichard

Synonyms
- List: Carex acuta var. angustifolia Čelak.; Carex acuta subsp. angustifolia Čelak.; Carex acuta f. badia Sanio; Carex acuta f. diluta Sanio; Carex acuta var. macrocarpa Čelak.; Carex acuta f. melanolepis Sanio; Carex acuta var. minor Sw.; Carex acuta subsp. nigra (L.) Ehrh.; Carex acuta var. nigra L.; Carex acuta var. oxylepis Sanio; Carex acuta f. pseudosparganioides Čelak.; Carex acuta f. stygia Sanio; Carex acuta var. turfosa Sanio; Carex alboatra Willd. ex Kunth; Carex alpina Honck.; Carex angustifolia Sm.; Carex aquanigra B.Boivin; Carex chlorocarpa Wimm.; Carex cespitosa var. alpina Gaudin; Carex cespitosa var. curvata F.Fleisch.; Carex cespitosa f. fuliginosa A.Braun; Carex cespitosa var. goodenowii (J.Gay) Fiori & Paol.; Carex cespitosa var. polymorpha Laest.; Carex cespitosa var. recta F.Fleisch.; Carex cespitosa var. intricata (Tineo ex Guss.) Fiori & Paol.; Carex cespitosa subsp. wiluica (Meinsh.) Krylov; Carex compacta Krock. ex Hoppe; Carex eboracensis Nelmes; Carex echinata subsp. angustifolia Čelak.; Carex fumida Beilschm.; Carex fusca All.; Carex gibsonii Bab.; Carex goodenoughii Asch. & Graebn.; Carex goodenowii J.Gay; Carex intermedia Miégev.; Carex intricata Tineo ex Guss.; Carex juncella (Fr.) Th.Fr.; Carex kolymaensis Kük.; Carex maackii Meinsh.; Carex malazena Steud.; Carex melaena Wimm.; Carex melanolepis Phil.; Carex navasii Merino; Carex obesa All.; Carex orbicularis var. caucasica Ö.Nilsson; Carex polyandra Schkuhr; Carex rigida var. goodenowii (J.Gay) L.H.Bailey; Carex rigida var. intricata (Tineo ex Guss.) Briq.; Carex rigida subsp. intricata (Tineo ex Guss.) Nyman; Carex rigida var. juncea (Fr.) L.H.Bailey; Carex rigida var. strictiformis L.H.Bailey; Carex rufa Lam.; Carex × spiculosa var. hebridensis A.Benn.; Carex stolonifera Hoppe; Carex subcaespitosa (Kük.) Wiinst.; Carex transcaucasica T.V.Egorova; Carex vulgaris Fr.; Carex wiluica Meinsh.; Carex zonata F.Nyl.; Vignantha vulgaris Schur; Vignea cerina Rchb.; Vignea cespitosa var. polygama Peterm.; Vignea chlorocarpa Schur; Vignea compacta Rchb.; Vignea crassinervis Schur; Vignea rigida Fuss; Vignea vulgaris Fuss

= Carex nigra =

Species of grass-like plant

Carex nigra is a perennial species of plant in the sedge family Cyperaceae. Common names include: smooth black sedge, black sedge and common sedge.

== Description ==
Carex nigra is a tussock-forming, evergreen perennial sedge, reaching up to 70cm in height. Leaves are bluish-green in colour. Flower spikes and seed heads are purplish-black, appearing in early to late summer.

== Distribution and habitat ==
It is native to wetlands of Europe, western Asia, north Africa, and eastern North America. The eastern limit of its range reaches central Siberia, Turkey and the Caucasus. It favours marshes, wetlands and alkaline fens.
