= Great Smoky Mountain sedge =

Great Smoky Mountain sedge is a common name for several plants and may refer to:

- Carex fumosimontana, native to the Great Smoky Mountains of the eastern United States
- Carex proposita, native to the Smoky Mountains of Idaho in the western United States
