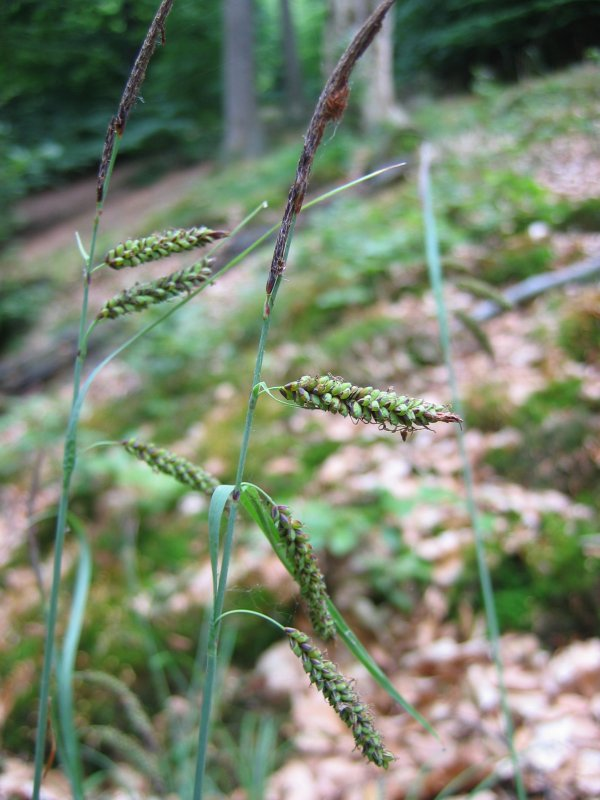

Scientific classification
- Kingdom: Plantae
- Clade: Tracheophytes
- Clade: Angiosperms
- Clade: Monocots
- Clade: Commelinids
- Order: Poales
- Family: Cyperaceae
- Genus: Carex
- Subgenus: Carex subg. Carex
- Section: Carex sect. Thuringiaca
- Species: C. flacca

Binomial name
- Carex flacca Schreb.

Synonyms
- Carex glauca Scop.

= Carex flacca =

Species of plant

Carex flacca (syn. Carex glauca), variously called blue sedge, gray carex, glaucous sedge, or carnation-grass, is a species of sedge native to parts of Europe and North Africa. It is frequent in a range of habitats, including grasslands, moorlands, exposed and disturbed soil, and the upper edges of salt marshes. It has naturalized in eastern North America.

== Description ==
Carex flacca leaves are blue-green above, glaucous beneath, to 6–12 inches (15–30 cm) in height. The arching leaves are about as long as the inflorescence, 12–16 inches (30–41 cm). The plant spreads in expanding clumps by lateral shoots rooting. Most stems have two male spikes, close together and often looking like one at first glance. Fruits are 2–2.5 millimetres (0.08–0.10 in), roundish, with a very short beak, under 0.3 millimetres (0.012 in). They are densely packed on the spike, not loose and gappy like Carex panicea. Female spikes are approximately 2–4 centimetres (0.8–1.6 in) long and 4–6 millimetres (0.16–0.24 in) wide. Female spikes are typically two, and can be short-stalked and upright, or longer-stalked and nodding.

== Cultivation ==
Carex flacca is cultivated by plant nurseries as an ornamental plant, planted for accent or as a groundcover in gardens and public landscapes. It is also used in drought tolerant landscaping and erosion control plantings. It grows in sun to part shade settings.
