= Carex laxiflora =

- Habit
- In Pennsylvania

Conservation status
- Secure (NatureServe)

Scientific classification
- Kingdom: Plantae
- Clade: Tracheophytes
- Clade: Angiosperms
- Clade: Monocots
- Clade: Commelinids
- Order: Poales
- Family: Cyperaceae
- Genus: Carex
- Species: C. laxiflora

Binomial name
- Carex laxiflora Lam.

Synonyms
- List: Carex anceps Muhl. ex Willd.; Carex anceps var. patulifolia Dewey ex Alph.Wood; Carex conoidea Muhl.; Carex fusiformis Chapm. ex Boott; Carex ignota var. fusiformis Dewey; Carex laxiflora var. divaricata L.H.Bailey; Carex laxiflora var. heterosperma Britton, Sterns & Poggenb.; Carex laxiflora var. intermedia Boott; Carex laxiflora var. major Boott; Carex laxiflora var. minor Boott; Carex laxiflora var. patulifolia (Dewey ex Alph.Wood) J.Carey; Carex laxiflora var. plantaginea Boott; Carex laxiflora var. serrulata F.J.Herm.; Carex nematosperma Willd. ex Kunth; Carex plantaginea Muhl.; Carex protracta Steud.; Carex styloflexa var. fusiformis Wiegand; Carex truncata Boeckeler; Deweya anceps (Muhl. ex Willd.) Raf.

Species of plant

Carex laxiflora, the broad looseflower sedge, is a species of flowering plant in the family Cyperaceae. It is native to eastern Canada and the central and eastern United States. A rhizomatous perennial reaching 0.6 m (2 ft), it is an upland species that can handle moist soils.
