= Carex littledalei =

Scientific classification
- Kingdom: Plantae
- Clade: Tracheophytes
- Clade: Angiosperms
- Clade: Monocots
- Clade: Commelinids
- Order: Poales
- Family: Cyperaceae
- Genus: Carex
- Species: C. littledalei

Binomial name
- Carex littledalei (C.B.Clarke) S.R.Zhang

Synonyms
- Kobresia littledalei C.B.Clarke; Kobresia tibetica subsp. littledalei (C.B.Clarke) P.C.Li

Species of sedge

Carex littledalei is a tussock-forming perennial in the family Cyperaceae. It is endemic to parts of Tibet and south central China including the province of Sichuan.

== See also ==
- List of Carex species
