= Carex kokanica =

Scientific classification
- Kingdom: Plantae
- Clade: Tracheophytes
- Clade: Angiosperms
- Clade: Monocots
- Clade: Commelinids
- Order: Poales
- Family: Cyperaceae
- Genus: Carex
- Species: C. kokanica

Binomial name
- Carex kokanica (Regel) S.R.Zhang

Species of sedge

Carex kokanica is a tussock-forming perennial in the family Cyperaceae. It is endemic to parts of Central Asia south to Pakistan extending east through the Himalaya including Nepal and Tibet through to central China in the west and Siberia in the north .

== See also ==
- List of Carex species
