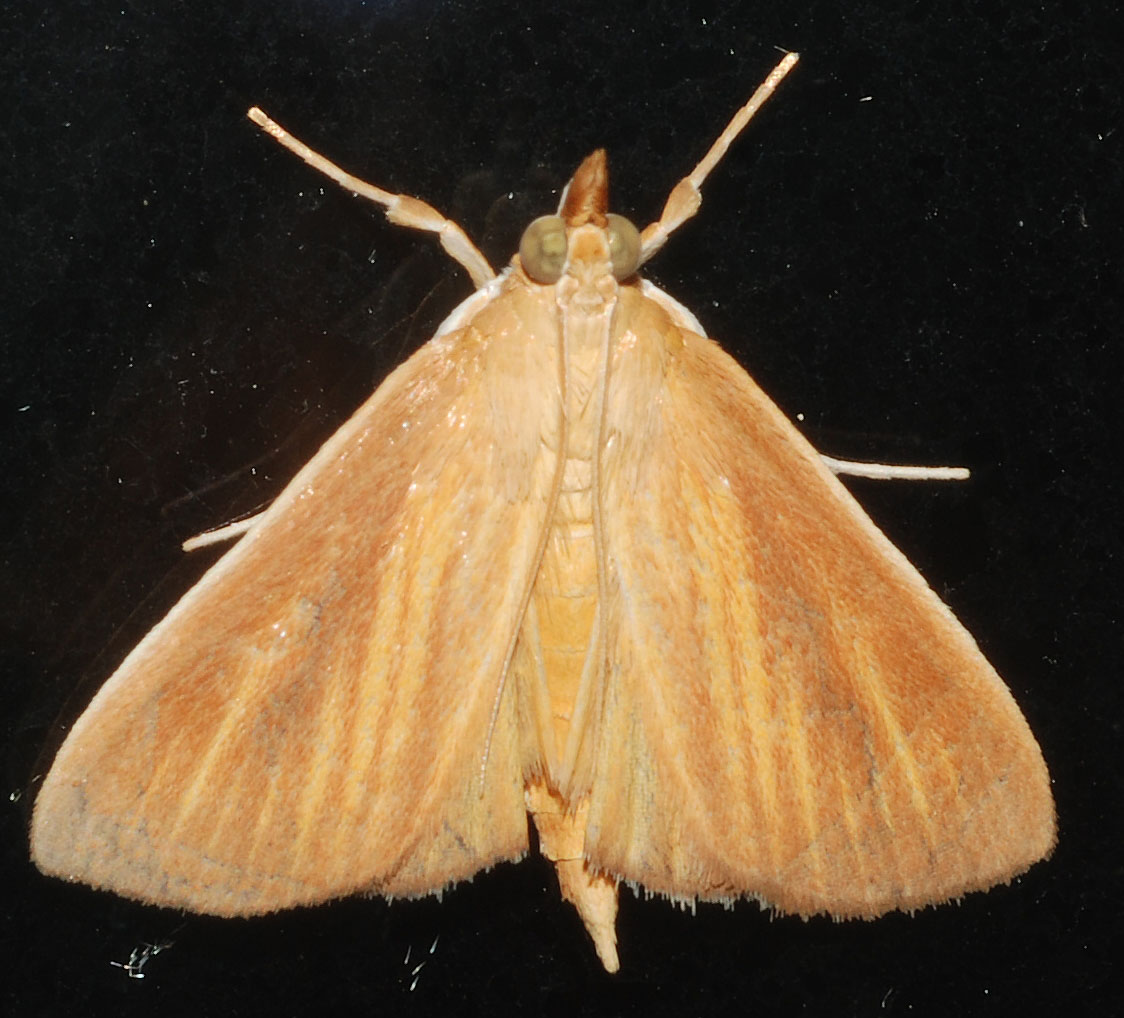
- Nascia acutella, Streaked Orange Moth (Hodges #4937). SERC, Edgewater, Anne Arundel County, MD - 08/10/16. Photo by Robert Aguilar, Smithsonian Environmental Research Center. Verified by Roger Downer (BAMONA).

Scientific classification
- Domain: Eukaryota
- Kingdom: Animalia
- Phylum: Arthropoda
- Class: Insecta
- Order: Lepidoptera
- Family: Crambidae
- Genus: Nascia
- Species: N. acutellus

Binomial name
- Nascia acutellus (Walker, 1866)

Synonyms
- Crambus acutellus Walker, 1866; Nascia acutella; Botis venalis Grote, 1878

= Nascia acutellus =

Species of moth

Nascia acutellus, the streaked orange moth, is a moth in the family Crambidae. It was described by Francis Walker in 1866. It is found in North America, where it has been recorded from Nova Scotia to Florida, west to Texas and north to Nebraska, Michigan and Ontario. It was also reported from Colorado. The habitat consists of wet grassy areas with sedges.

The wingspan is about 22 mm. Adults are on wing from May to August.

The larvae probably feed on Cyperaceae species.
