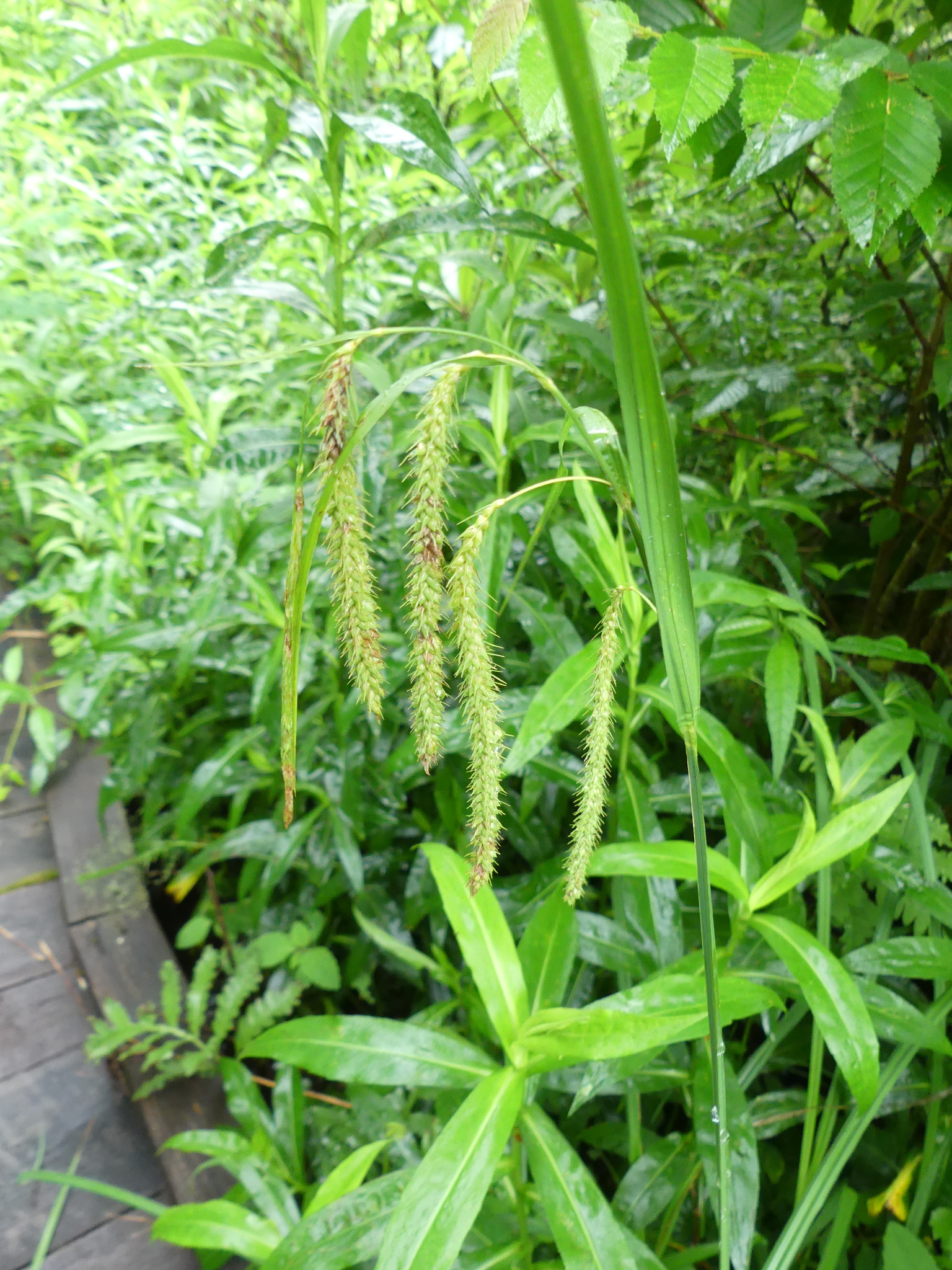

Conservation status
- Least Concern (IUCN 3.1)

Scientific classification
- Kingdom: Plantae
- Clade: Tracheophytes
- Clade: Angiosperms
- Clade: Monocots
- Clade: Commelinids
- Order: Poales
- Family: Cyperaceae
- Genus: Carex
- Species: C. gynandra

Binomial name
- Carex gynandra Schwein., 1824

= Carex gynandra =

Species of sedge

Carex gynandra, also known as nodding sedge, is a species of flowering plant in the sedge family, Cyperaceae. It is native to eastern Canada and the United States.

== See also ==
- List of Carex species
