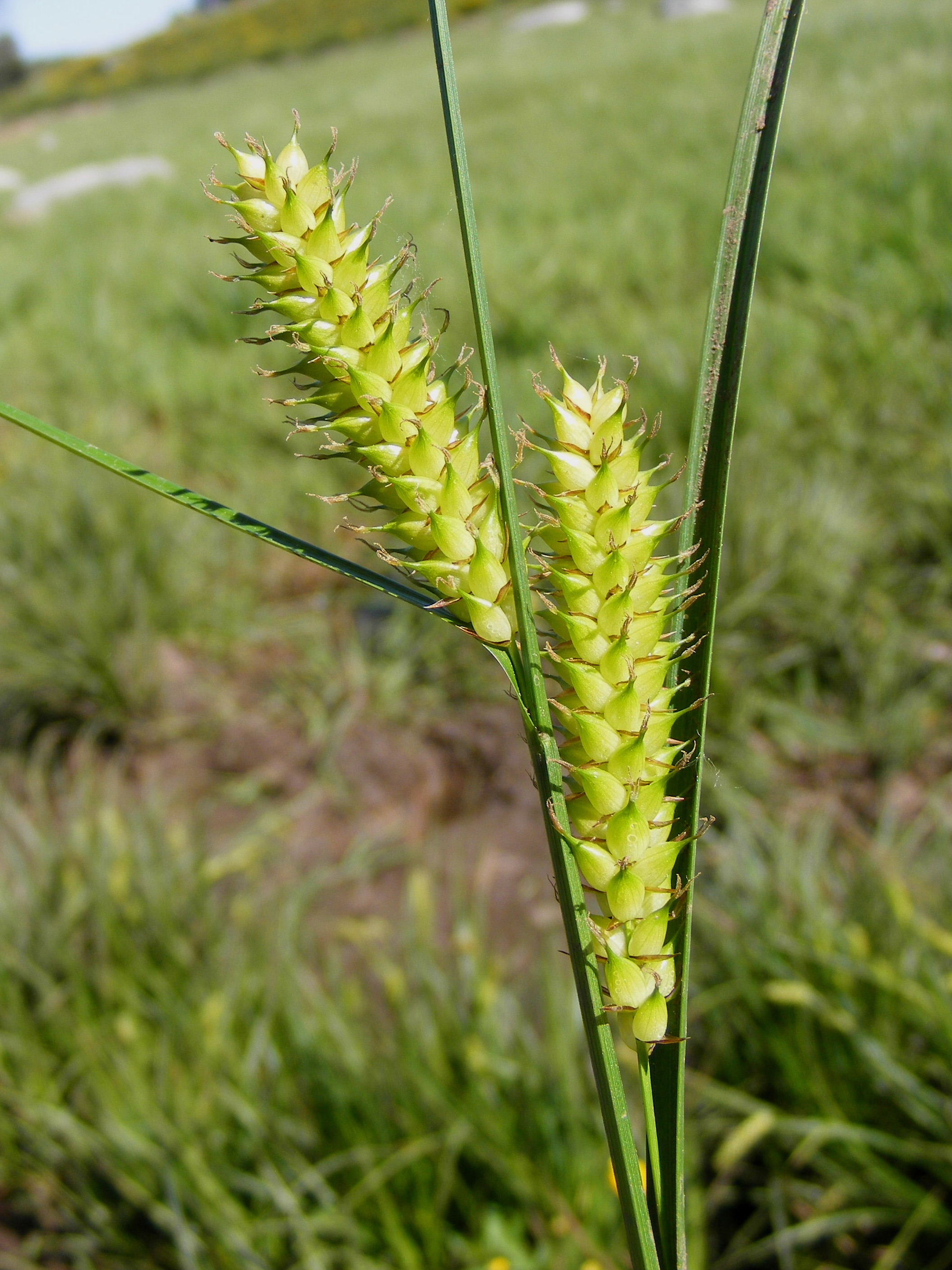

Conservation status
- Least Concern (IUCN 3.1)

Scientific classification
- Kingdom: Plantae
- Clade: Tracheophytes
- Clade: Angiosperms
- Clade: Monocots
- Clade: Commelinids
- Order: Poales
- Family: Cyperaceae
- Genus: Carex
- Subgenus: Carex subg. Carex
- Section: Carex sect. Vesicariae
- Species: C. vesicaria

Binomial name
- Carex vesicaria L.

= Carex vesicaria =

Species of grass-like plant

Carex vesicaria is an essentially Holarctic species of sedge known as bladder sedge, inflated sedge, and blister sedge. It has been used to insulate footwear in Norway, Sweden and among the Sami people, and for basketry in North America.

== Description ==
Carex vesicaria is a perennial plant with short creeping rhizomes which grow shoots resembling small tufts. It grows to heights of 30 to 120 cm (12 to 47 in). Its stems are rough near the tip but smoother towards their base. The narrow, ridged and pleated leaves can grow to around 1 m (3.3 ft) in length or more, and have fine toothed edges and sharp points. The fruits are erect, glossy and bulbous. The flower clusters are long and cylindrical in shape and each contains up to 150 developing fruits.

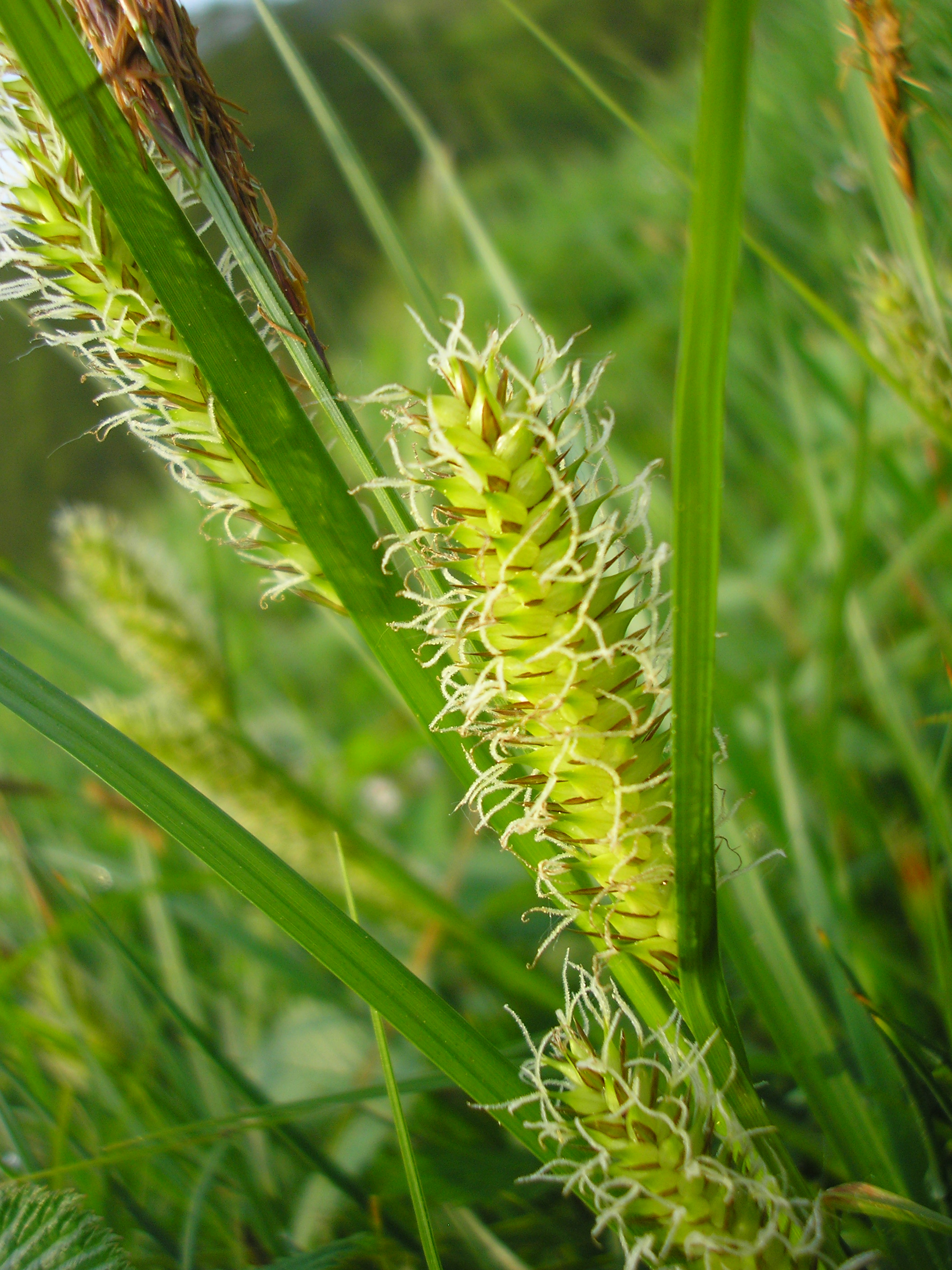
Flowering

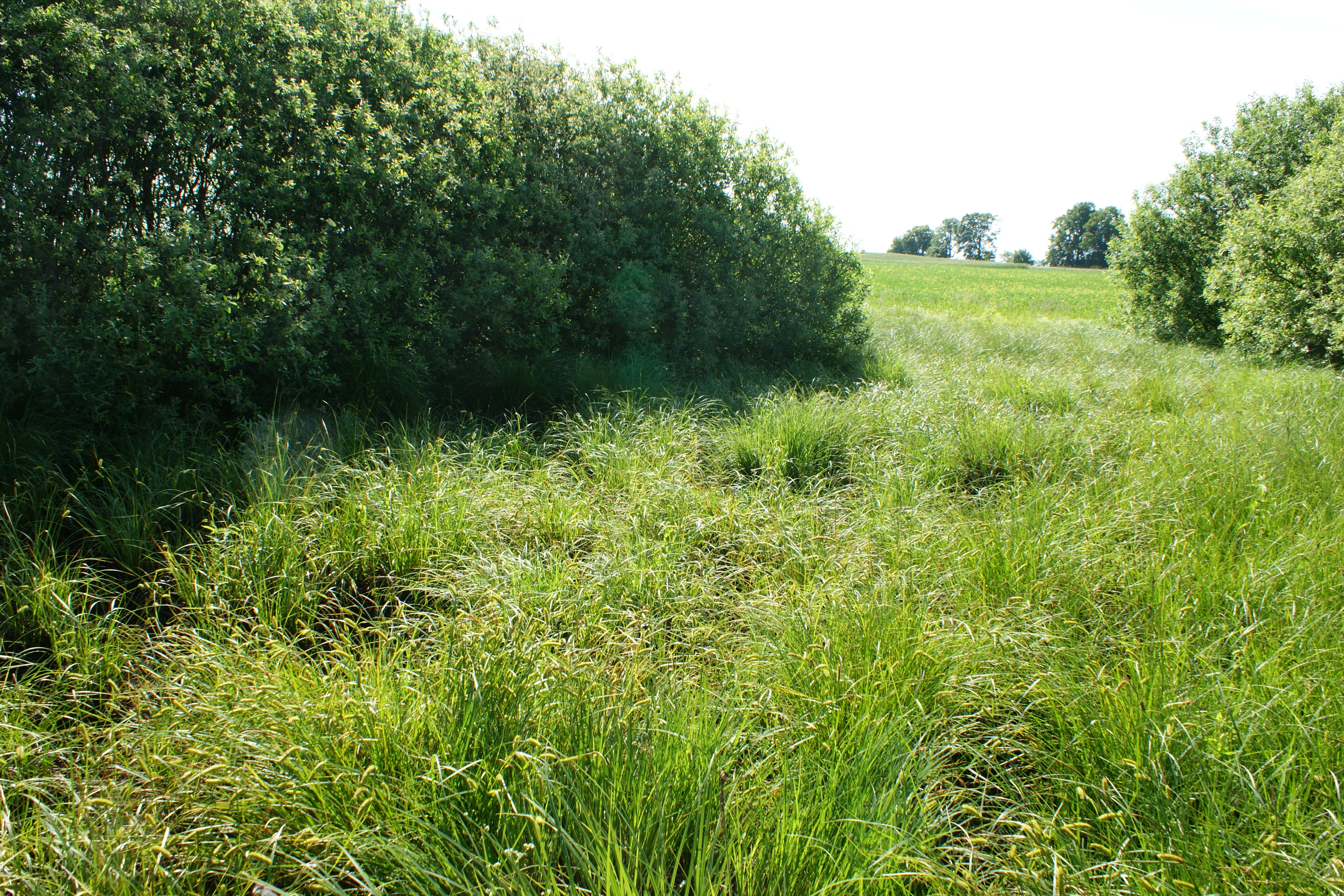
Sedge meadow in northern Poland

== Taxonomy ==
Carex vesicaria was first formally named by Carl Linnaeus in 1753. Many forms and varieties have been named, but no infraspecific taxa of Carex vesicaria are accepted in Kew's Plants of the World Online as of March 2020.

== Distribution ==
Bladder sedge has a circumpolar, boreo-temperate distribution. It is native to northern North America being recorded over most of Canada and the northern United States, as far south as California. It can also be found in nearly all of northern Europe and northern Asia as far as Japan and Korea. It is widespread in Britain and Ireland although it is absent from the Orkney and Shetland and very rare in the Western Isles.

== Habitat ==
Carex vesicaria grows in damp habitats, mostly in mesotrophic soils which are slightly basic, in areas where the water table is at or above the soil surface. It grows along edge of many types of waterbodies, as well as damp depressions in pastures and in wet woodlands. It can also colonise wet areas Where pits have been created for extraction of aggregates such as sand, gravel, or clay.

In Britain it has an altitude range of 0–455 m (0–1,493 ft) with the highest plants being found at Llyn Gorast in Cardiganshire.

== Uses ==
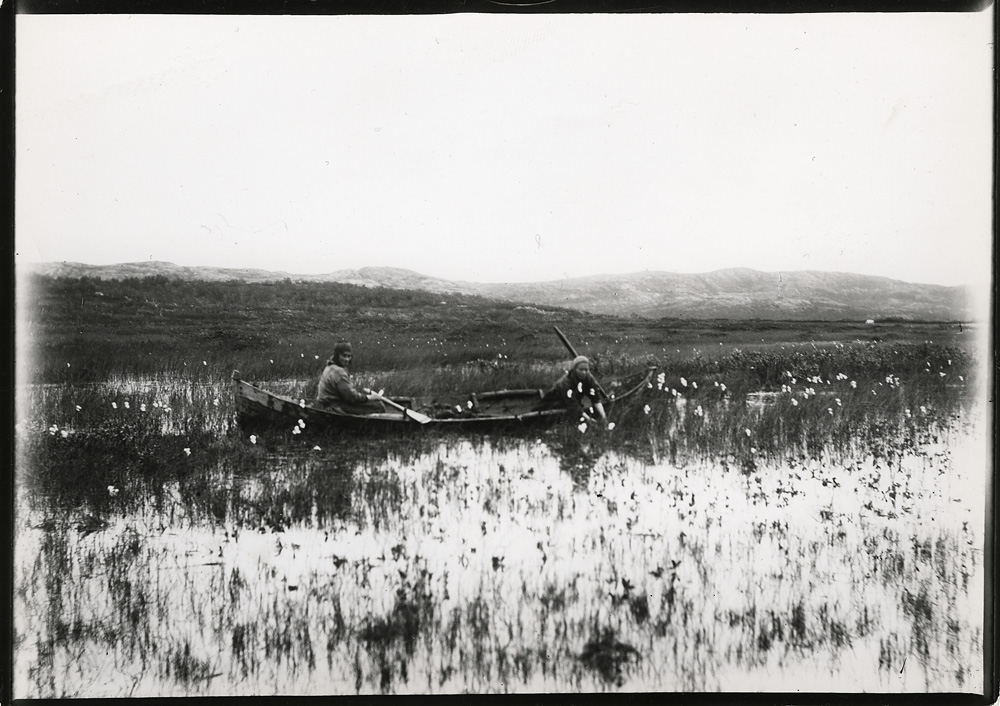
Harvesting sennegrass

Carex vesicaria was cultivated in North America by indigenous people as its rhizomes were used for basketry, The dried fibres, were sometimes used as thermal insulation in footwear in polar regions, are known as sennegrass, saennegrass or similar, from the plant's Bokmål name sennegras.
