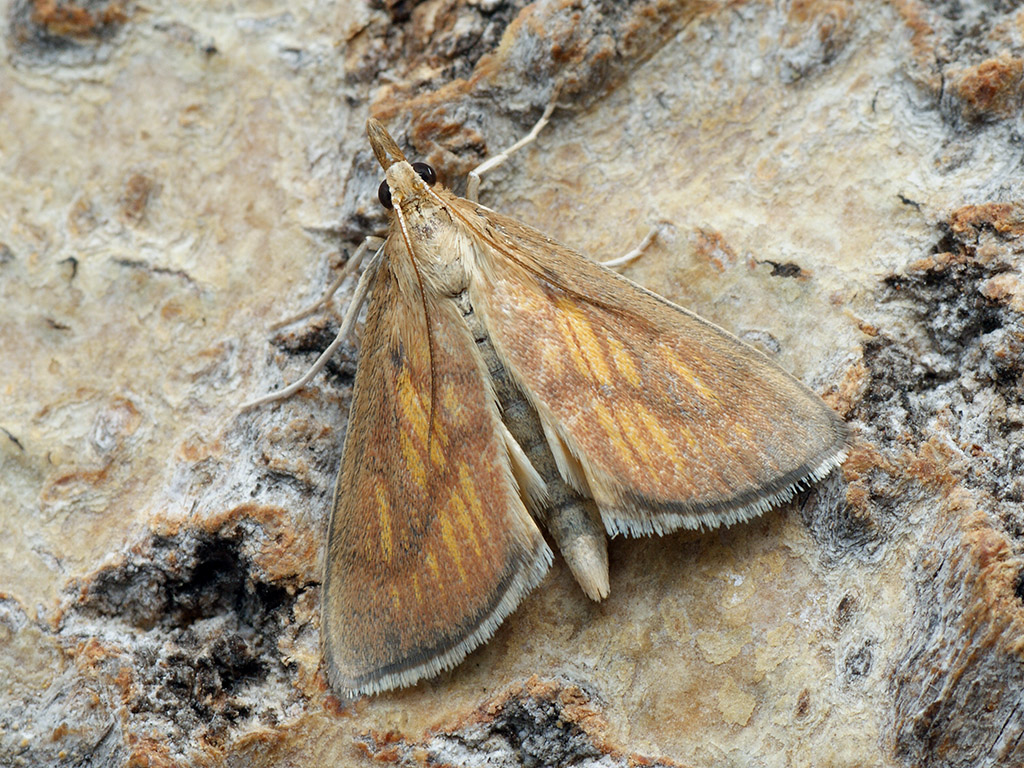
- Nascia cilialis

Scientific classification
- Domain: Eukaryota
- Kingdom: Animalia
- Phylum: Arthropoda
- Class: Insecta
- Order: Lepidoptera
- Family: Crambidae
- Subfamily: Pyraustinae
- Genus: Nascia; J. Curtis, 1835

= Nascia =

Genus of moths

Nascia is a genus of moths of the family Crambidae.

== Species ==
- Nascia acutellus (Walker, 1866)
- Nascia cilialis (Hübner, 1796)
- Nascia citrinalis Warren, 1892
