= Nascia citrinalis =

Scientific classification
- Domain: Eukaryota
- Kingdom: Animalia
- Phylum: Arthropoda
- Class: Insecta
- Order: Lepidoptera
- Family: Crambidae
- Genus: Nascia
- Species: N. citrinalis

Binomial name
- Nascia citrinalis Warren, 1892

Species of moth

Nascia citrinalis is a moth in the family Crambidae. It was described by Warren in 1892. It is found in India.
