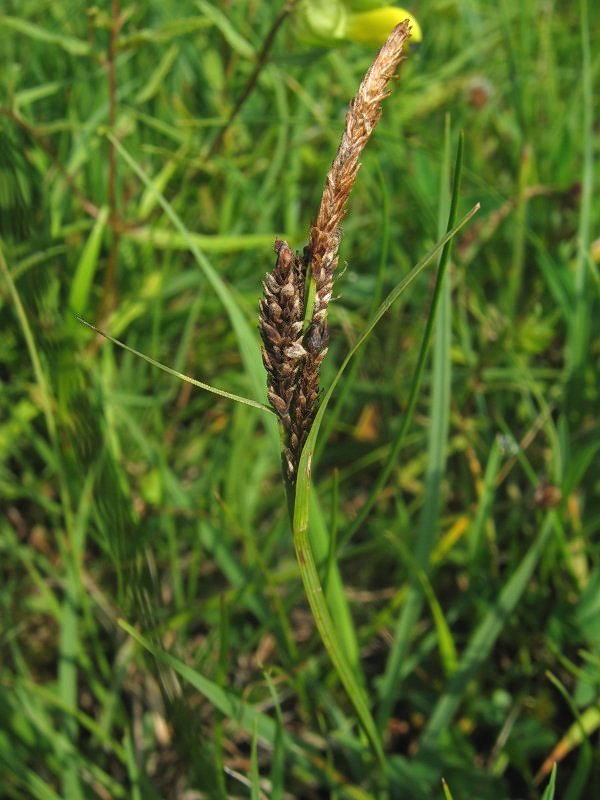

Scientific classification
- Kingdom: Plantae
- Clade: Tracheophytes
- Clade: Angiosperms
- Clade: Monocots
- Clade: Commelinids
- Order: Poales
- Family: Cyperaceae
- Genus: Carex
- Subgenus: Carex subg. Carex
- Section: Carex sect. Paniceae
- Species: C. panicea

Binomial name
- Carex panicea L.

= Carex panicea =

Species of grass-like plant

Carex panicea, commonly known as carnation sedge, is a plant species in the sedge family, Cyperaceae. It is known as grass-like sedge and can be found in Northern and Western Europe, and also in north-eastern North America. The plant produces fruits which are 3–4 millimetres (0.12–0.16 in) long, are egg shaped and spiked. Both male and female species leaves are pale blue on both sides.
