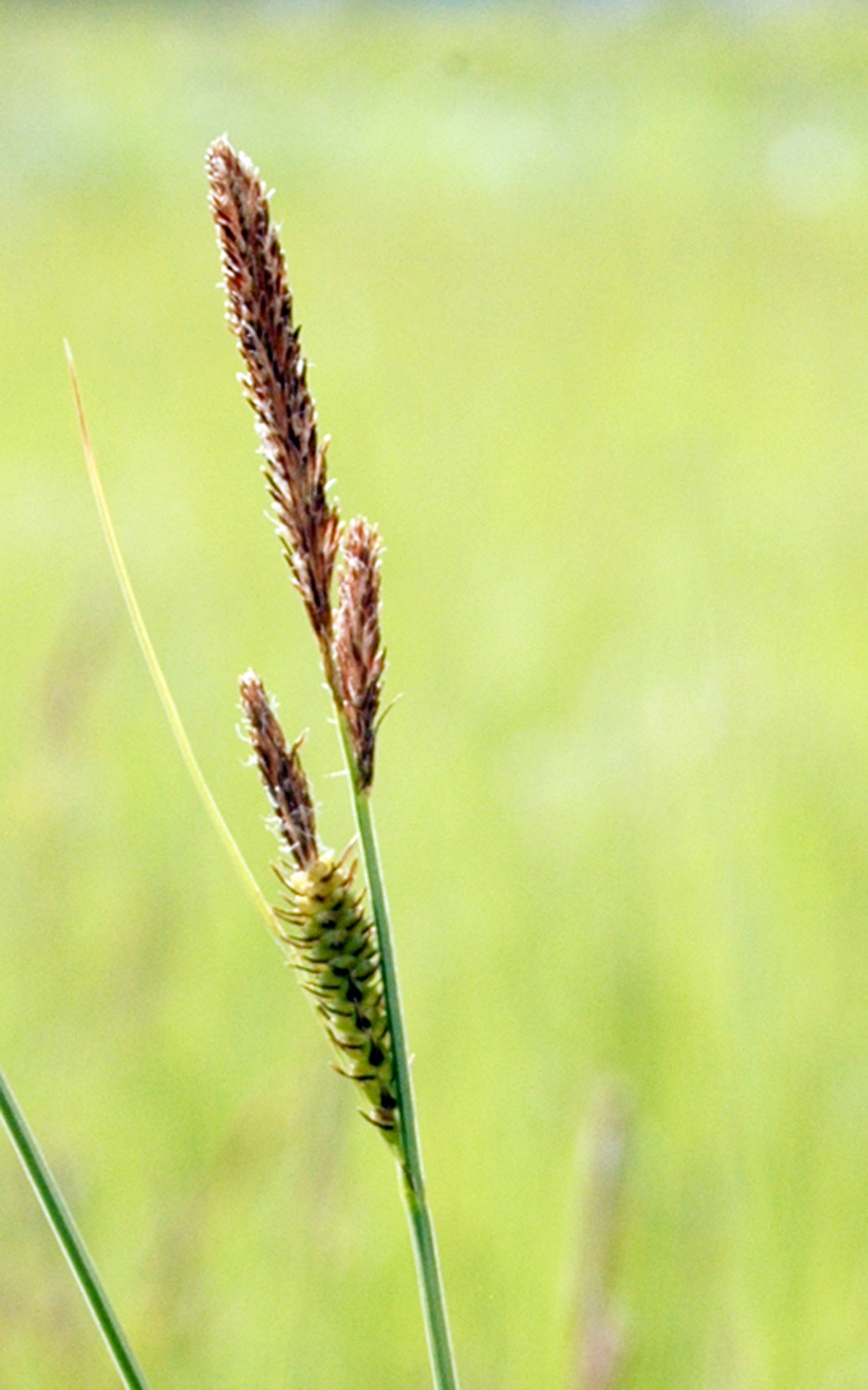
- Carex stricta

Scientific classification
- Kingdom: Plantae
- Clade: Tracheophytes
- Clade: Angiosperms
- Clade: Monocots
- Clade: Commelinids
- Order: Poales
- Family: Cyperaceae
- Genus: Carex
- Subgenus: Carex subg. Carex
- Section: Carex sect. Phacocystis; Dumortier

= Carex sect. Phacocystis =

Group of sedges

Carex sect. Phacocystis is a section of the genus Carex, containing between 70 and 90 species worldwide. With 31 species in the North American flora, sedges in Carex sect. Phacocystis commonly occur in wetlands such as shorelines, marshes, and tundra.
