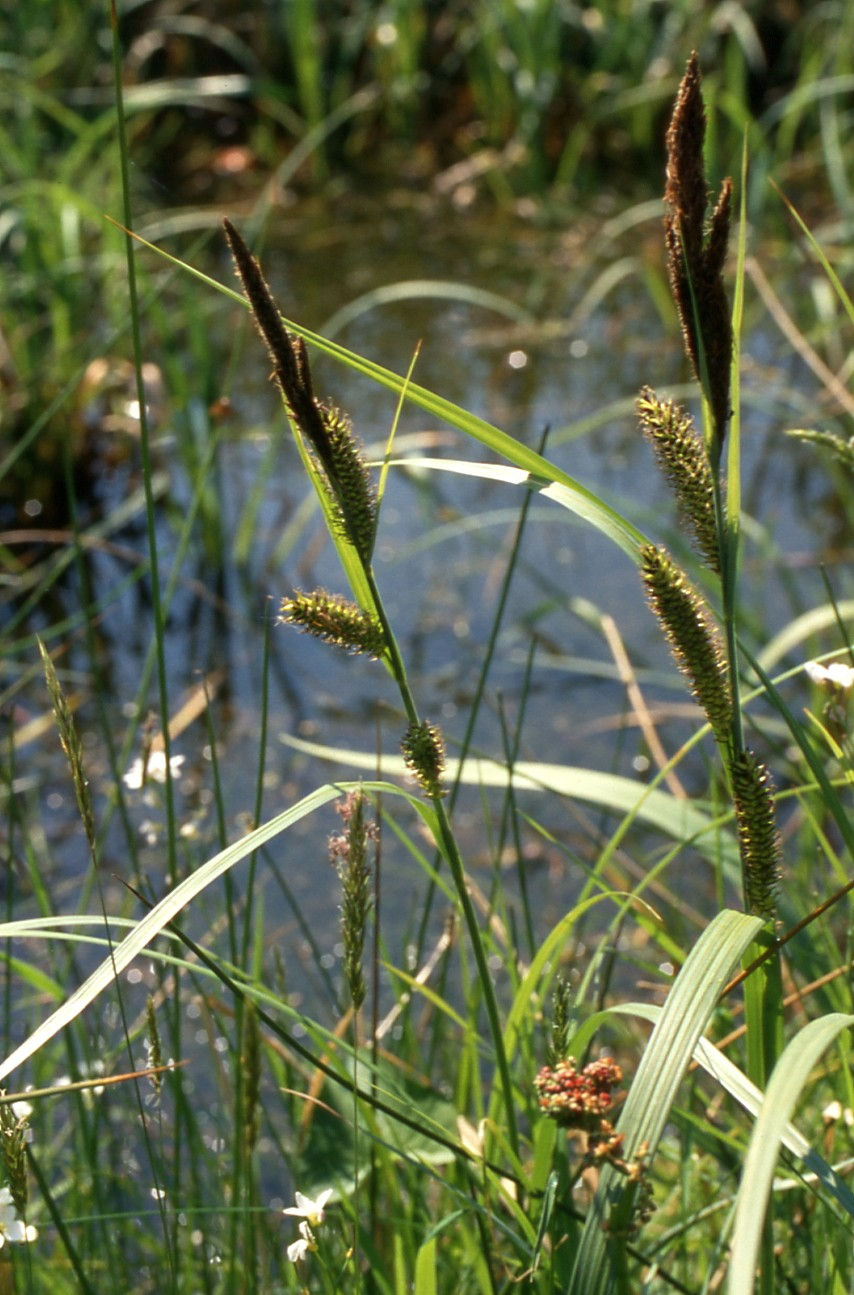
- Carex riparia

Scientific classification
- Kingdom: Plantae
- Clade: Tracheophytes
- Clade: Angiosperms
- Clade: Monocots
- Clade: Commelinids
- Order: Poales
- Family: Cyperaceae
- Genus: Carex
- Subgenus: Carex subg. Carex

Type species
- Carex hirta L.

= Carex subg. Carex =

Subgenus of sedges

Carex subg. Carex is a subgenus of the sedge genus Carex. It is the largest of the four traditionally recognised subgenera, containing around 1400 of the 2000 species in the genus. Its members are characterised by the presence of one or more exclusively male (staminate) terminal spikes, quite dissimilar in appearance from the lateral female (pistillate) spikes below. In most species, the female flowers have three stigmas, but a few species, including Carex nigra, have female flowers with only two stigmas.

== See also ==
- List of Carex species
