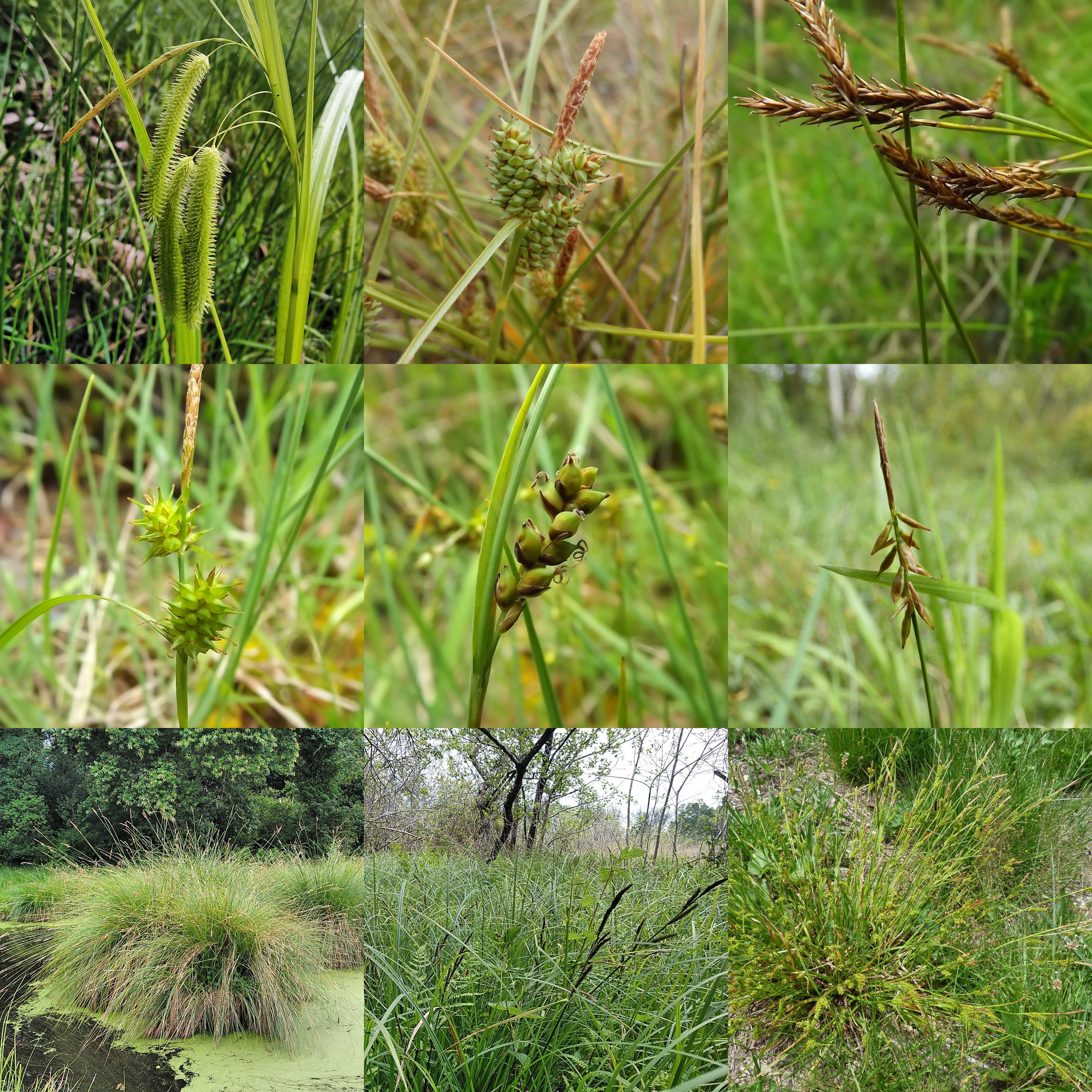
- Various species of sedges

Scientific classification
- Kingdom: Plantae
- Clade: Tracheophytes
- Clade: Angiosperms
- Clade: Monocots
- Clade: Commelinids
- Order: Poales
- Family: Cyperaceae
- Genus: Carex; L.

Type species
- Carex hirta L.

Diversity
- 2000+ species
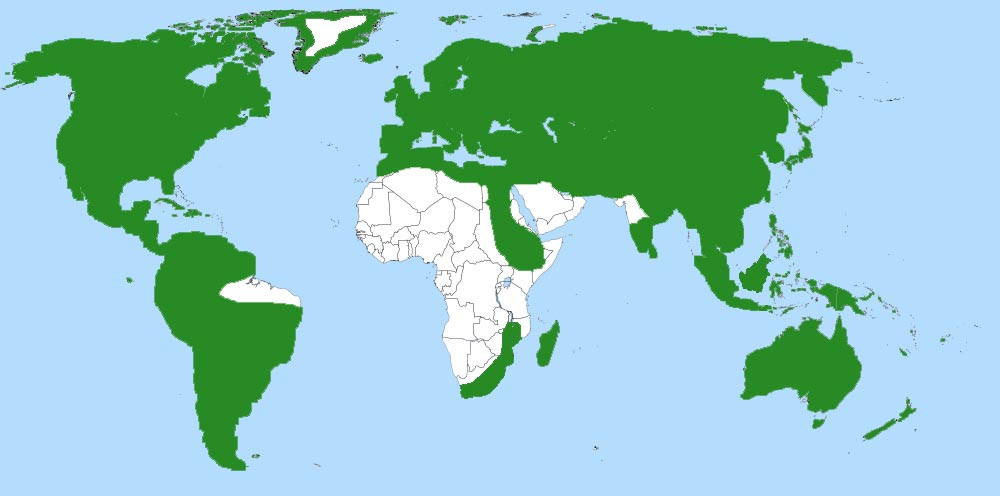
- Global distribution of Carex (green)

Synonyms
- List: Agistron Raf.; Ammorrhiza Ehrh.; Anithista Raf.; Archaeocarex Börner; Baeochortus Ehrh.; Bitteria Börner; Blysmocarex N.A.Ivanova; Callistachys Heuff.; Caricella Ehrh.; Caricina St.-Lag.; Caricinella St.-Lag.; Chionanthula Börner; Chordorrhiza Ehrh.; Cobresia Pers.; Coleachyron J.Gay ex Boiss.; Cryptoglochin Heuff.; Cymophyllus Mack. ex Britton & A.Br.; Cyperoides Ség.; Dapedostachys Börner; Desmiograstis Börner; Deweya Raf.; Diemisa Raf.; Diplocarex Hayata; Dornera Heuff. ex Schur; Drymeia Ehrh.; Echinochlaenia Börner; Edritria Raf.; Elyna Schrad.; Facolos Raf.; Forexeta Raf.; Froelichia Wulfen; Genersichia Heuff.; Heleonastes Ehrh.; Hemicarex Benth.; Heuffelia Opiz; Holmia Börner; Homalostachys Boeckeler; Itheta Raf.; Kobresia Willd.; Kobria St.-Lag.; Kolerma Raf.; Kuekenthalia Börner; Lamprochlaenia Börner; Leptostachys Ehrh.; Leptovignea Börner; Leucoglochin Heuff.; Limivasculum Börner; Limonaetes Ehrh.; Loncoperis Raf.; Loxanisa Raf.; Loxotrema Raf.; Manochlaenia Börner; Maukschia Heuff.; Meltrema Raf.; Neilreichia Kotula; Neskiza Raf.; Olamblis Raf.; Olotrema Raf.; Onkerma Raf.; Osculisa Raf.; Phaeolorum Ehrh.; Phyllostachys Torr.; Physiglochis Neck.; Polyglochin Ehrh.; Proteocarpus Börner; Pseudocarex Miq.; Psyllophora Ehrh.; Ptacoseia Ehrh.; Rhaptocalymma Borrer; Rhynchopera Börner; Schelhammeria Moench; Schoenoxiphium Nees; Temnemis Raf.; Thysanocarex Börner; Trasus Gray; Ulva Adans.; Uncinia Pers.; Vesicarex Steyerm.; Vignantha Schur; Vignea P.Beauv. ex T.Lestib.; Vignidula Börner

= Carex =

Genus of flowering plants

Carex is a vast genus of over 2,000 species of grass-like plants in the family Cyperaceae, commonly known as sedges (or seg, in older books). Other members of the family Cyperaceae are also called sedges; however, those of genus Carex may be called true sedges. Carex is the most species-rich genus in the family. The study of Carex is known as caricology.

== Description ==
All species of Carex are perennial, although some species, such as C. bebbii and C. viridula can fruit in their first year of growth, and may not survive longer. They typically have rhizomes, stolons or short rootstocks, but some species grow in tufts (caespitose). The culm – the flower-bearing stalk – is unbranched and usually erect. It is usually distinctly triangular in section.

The leaves of Carex comprise a blade, which extends away from the stalk, and a sheath, which encloses part of the stalk. The blade is normally long and flat, but may be folded, inrolled, channelled or absent. The leaves have parallel veins and a distinct midrib. Where the blade meets the culm there is a structure called the ligule. The colour of foliage may be green, red or brown, and "ranges from fine and hair-like, sometimes with curled tips, to quite broad with a noticeable midrib and sometimes razor sharp edges".

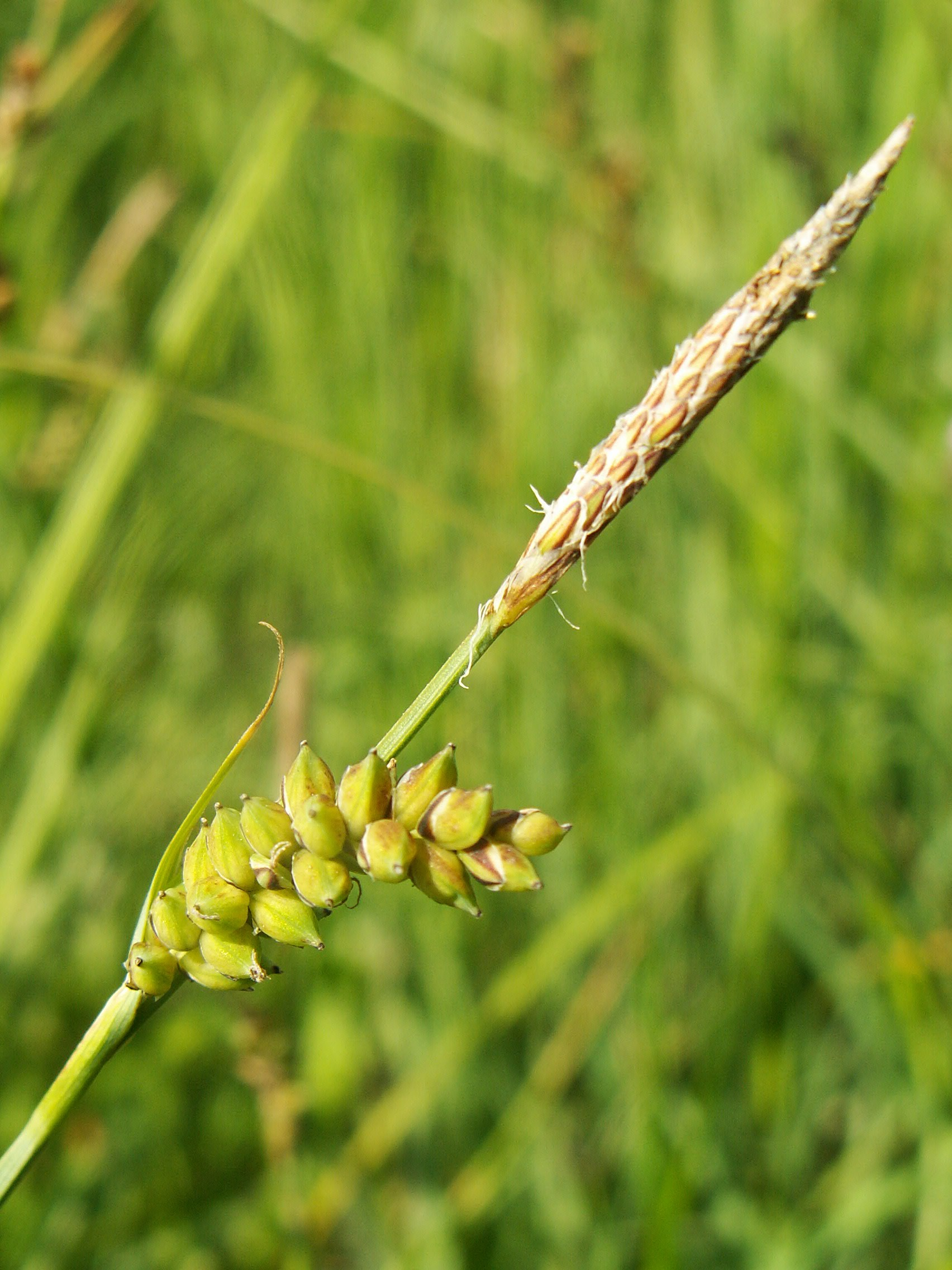
In this Carex panicea, the upper spike contains male flowers, and the lower spike contains female flowers.

The flowers of Carex are small and are combined into spikes, which are themselves combined into a larger inflorescence. The spike typically contains many flowers, but can hold as few as one in some species. Almost all Carex species are monoecious; while each flower is either male (staminate) or female (pistillate), both types of flower typically occur together on the same plant. A few species are dioecious. Sedges exhibit diverse arrangements of male and female flowers. Often, the lower spikes are entirely pistillate and upper spikes staminate, with one or more spikes in between having pistillate flowers near the base and staminate flowers near the tip. In other species, all spikes are similar. In that case, they may have male flowers above and female flowers below (androgynous) or female flowers above and male flowers below (gynecandrous). In relatively few species, the arrangement of flowers is irregular.

The defining structure of the genus Carex is the bottle-shaped bract surrounding each female flower. This structure is called the perigynium or utricle, a modified prophyll. It is typically extended into a "rostrum" or beak, which is often divided at the tip (bifid) into two teeth. The shape, venation, and vestiture (hairs) of the perigynium are important structures for distinguishing Carex species.

The fruit of Carex is a dry, one-seeded indehiscent achene or nut which grows within the perigynium. Perigynium features aid in fruit dispersal.

== Ecology and distribution ==
Carex species are found across most of the world, albeit with few species in tropical lowlands, and relatively few in sub-Saharan Africa. Most (but not all) sedges are found in wetlands – such as marshes, calcareous fens, bogs and other peatlands, pond and stream banks, riparian zones, and even ditches. They are one of the dominant plant groups in arctic and alpine tundra, and in wetland habitats with a water depth of up to 50 cm (20 in).

== Taxonomy and cytogenetics ==
The genus Carex was established by Carl Linnaeus in his work Species Plantarum in 1753, and it is one of the largest genera of flowering plants. Estimates of the number of species vary from about 1100 to almost 2000. Carex displays the most dynamic chromosome evolution of all flowering plants. Chromosome numbers range from n = 6 to n = 66, and over 100 species are known to show variation in chromosome number within the species, with differences of up to 10 chromosomes between populations.

The genomes of Carex kokanica, Carex parvula and Carex littledalei have been sequenced.

Carex has been divided into subgenera in a number of ways. The most influential was Georg Kükenthal's classification using four subgenera – Carex, Vignea, Indocarex and Primocarex – based primarily on the arrangement of the male and female flowers. There has been considerable debate about the status of these four groups, with some species being transferred between groups and some authors, such as Kenneth Kent Mackenzie, eschewing the subgenera altogether and dividing the genus directly into sections. The genus is now divided into around four subgenera, some of which may not, however, be monophyletic:

- Carex subg. Carex – 1450 species, distributed globally
- Carex subg. Psyllophora (Degl.) Peterm. (equivalent to Kükenthal's "Primocarex") – 70 species
- Carex subg. Vignea (P. Beauv. ex T. Lestib.) Peterm. – 350 species, cosmopolitan
- Carex subg. Vigneastra (Tuckerman) Kükenthal (equivalent to Kükenthal's "Indocarex") – 100 species, tropical and subtropical Asia

== Fossil record ==
Several fossil fruits of two Carex species have been described from strata of the middle Miocene in the Fasterholt area near Silkeborg in Central Jutland, Denmark.

== Uses ==
=== Ornamental ===
Carex species and cultivars are popular in horticulture, particularly in shady positions. Native species are used in wildland habitat restoration projects, natural landscaping, and in sustainable landscaping as drought-tolerant grass replacements for lawns and garden meadows. Some require damp or wet conditions, others are relatively drought-tolerant. Propagation is by seed or division in spring.

The cultivars Carex elata 'Aurea' (Bowles' golden sedge) and Carex oshimensis 'Evergold' have received the Royal Horticultural Society's Award of Garden Merit.

=== Other uses ===
A mix of dried specimens of several species of Carex (including Carex vesicaria) have a history of being used as thermal insulation in footwear (such as nutukas used by Sámi people). Sennegrass is one of the names for such mixes. During the first human expedition to the South Pole in 1911, such a mix was used in skaller, when camps had been set (after each stretch of travelling had been completed). Carsten Borchgrevink of the British Antarctic Expedition 1898–1900 said "Socks are never used in Finnmarken in winter time, but 'senne grass' which they... had a special method of arranging in the 'komager' (Finn boots)."

Species serve as a food source for numerous animals, and some are used as a livestock hay.

=== Use by Native Americans ===
The Blackfoot put carex in moccasins to protect the feet during winter. The Cherokee use an infusion of the leaf to "check bowels". The Ohlone use the roots of many species for basketry. The Goshute use the root as medicine. The Jemez consider the plant sacred and use it in the kiva. The Klamath people weave the leaves into mats, use the juice of the pith as a beverage, eat the fresh stems for food and use the tuberous base of the stem for food. The indigenous people of Mendocino County, California use the rootstocks to make baskets and rope. The indigenous people of Montana also weave the leaves into mats and use the young stems as food. The Navajo of Kayenta, Arizona grind the seeds into mush and eat them. The Oregon Paiute weave it to make spoons. The Pomo use the roots to make baskets, and use it to tend fishing traps. They also use it to make torches. The Coast Salish use the leaves to make baskets and twine. The Songhees eat the leaves to induce abortions. The Nlaka'pamux used the leaves as brushes for cleaning things and use the leaves as forage for their livestock. The Wailaki weave the roots and leaves into baskets and use the leaves to weave mats. The Yuki people use the large roots to make baskets.

== See also ==
- List of Carex species
