= Kenneth Kent Mackenzie =

Amateur botanist and lawyer (1877-1934)

Kenneth Kent Mackenzie (1877–1934) was a lawyer and amateur botanist who wrote extensively on the genus Carex in North America. The standard author abbreviation Mack. is used to indicate this person as the author when citing a botanical name.

== Taxa ==
=== Cyperaceae ===
He described the following taxa in the family Cyperaceae (sedges); alternative combinations are indented.

- Carex abramsii Mack.
- Carex abrupta Mack.
- Carex abscondita Mack.
- Carex acutinella Mack.
- Carex agglomerata Mack.
- Carex aggregata Mack.

= Carex sparganioides var. aggregata (Mack.) Gleason

- Carex agrostoides Mack.
- Carex albonigra Mack.
- Carex allegheniensis Mack.
- Carex amphigena Mack.
- Carex amplectens Mack.
- Carex leersii var. angustata (J.Carey) Mack.
- Carex angustior Mack.
- Carex arctaeformis Mack.
- Carex arctiformis Mack.

= Carex canescens subsp. arctiformis (Mack.) Calder & Roy L.Taylor

- Carex artitecta Mack.
- Carex atrosquama Mack.

= Carex atrata subsp. atrosquama (Mack.) Hultén
= Carex atrata var. atrosquama (Mack.) Cronquist

- Carex austrina Mack.
- Carex autumnalis Mack.
- Carex aztecica Mack.
- Carex biltmoreana Mack.
- Carex brachyglossa Mack.
- Carex brainerdii Mack.
- Carex brevicaulis Mack.

= Carex deflexa var. brevicaulis (Mack.) B.Boivin

- Carex breviligulata Mack.
- Carex brevior (Dewey) Mack.
- Carex brevisquama Mack.
- Carex bulbostylis Mack.
- Carex bushii Mack.
- Carex caesariensis Mack.
- Carex camporum Mack.
- Carex chihuahuensis Mack.
- Carex chlorophila Mack.
- Carex colorata Mack.
- Carex concinnoides Mack.
- Carex conspecta Mack.
- Carex convoluta Mack.
- Carex cryptolepis Mack.
- Carex cumulata Mack.
- Carex cusickii Mack. ex Piper & Beattie
- Carex davyi Mack.
- Carex debiliformis Mack.
- Carex dudleyi (Mack.)
- Carex egglestonii Mack.
- Carex egregia Mack.
- Carex epapillosa Mack.

= Carex heteroneura var. epapillosa (Mack.) F.J.Herm.

- Carex exserta Mack.
- Carex farwellii Mack.
- Carex fernandezensis Mack. ex G.A.Wheeler
- Carex festivella Mack.

= Carex macloviana subsp. festivella (Mack.) Á.Löve & D.Löve

- Carex sect. Firmiculmes (Kük.) Mack.
- Carex fissa Mack.
- Carex fissuricola Mack.
- Carex flaccifolia Mack.
- Carex fracta Mack.
- Carex fulvescens Mack.
- Carex fuscotincta Mack.
- Carex geophila Mack.
- Carex gigas Mack.
- Carex glacialis Mack.
- Carex gracilior Mack.
- Carex pachystachya var. gracilis Mack.
- Carex harfordii Mack.
- Carex heliophila Mack.

= Carex inops subsp. heliophila (Mack.) Crins
= Carex pensylvanica subsp. heliophila (Mack.) W.A.Weber

- Carex helleri Mack.
- Carex hirsutella Mack.

= Carex complanata subsp. hirsutella (Mack.) R.T.Clausen

- Carex hirtifolia Mack.
- Carex sect. Hispidae Mack. ex Reznicek
- Carex holmiana Mack.
- Carex howei Mack.
- Carex impressa Mack.
- Carex incurviformis Mack.

= Carex maritima var. incurviformis (Mack.) B.Boivin

- Carex integra Mack.
- Carex involucratella Mack.
- Carex castanea var. knieskernii Mack.
- Carex laevivaginata (Kük.) Mack.
- Carex lancifructus Mack.
- Carex laricina Mack. ex Bright

= Carex muricata var. laricina (Mack. ex Bright) Gleason

- Carex latebrosa Mack.
- Carex laxior Mack.
- Carex leiophylla Mack.

= Carex sabulosa subsp. leiophylla (Mack.) A.E.Porsild

- Carex leporinella Mack.
- Carex leptopoda Mack. in Rydb.

= Carex deweyana subsp. leptopoda (Mack.) Calder & Roy L.Taylor
= Carex deweyana var. leptopoda (Mack.) B.Boivin

- Carex microptera var. limnophila (F.J.Herm.) Dorn
- Carex longa Mack.
- Carex sect. Longicaules Mack. ex Reznicek
- Carex longii Mack.
- Carex lunelliana Mack.
- Carex luridiformis Mack. ex Reznicek & M.S.González Elizondo
- Carex macrosperma Mack.
- Carex magnifolia Mack.
- Carex mediterranea Mack.
- Carex longii subsp. meridionalis (Kük.) Luceño & M.Alves
- Carex merritt-fernaldii Mack.
- Carex mesochorea Mack.

= Carex cephalophora var. mesochorea (Mack.) Gleason

- Carex microptera Mack.

= Carex macloviana var. microptera (Mack.) B.Boivin

- Carex microrhyncha Mack.
- Carex miserabilis Mack.
- Carex mohriana Mack.
- Carex molesta Mack.

= Carex brevior var. molesta (Mack.) F.C.Gates

- Carex montereyensis Mack.
- Carex multicostata Mack.
- Carex nelsonii Mack.
- Carex neomexicana Mack.
- Carex neurophora Mack. in Abrams
- Carex normalis Mack.
- Carex nubicola Mack.
- Carex oklahomensis Mack.

= Carex stipata var. oklahomensis (Mack.) Gleason

- Carex olympica Mack.
- Carex onusta Mack.
- Carex ormantha Mack.
- Carex pachycarpa Mack.
- Carex paucicostata Mack.
- Carex paucifructus Mack.
- Carex perglobosa Mack.
- Carex perstricta Mack.

= Carex schiedeana var. perstricta (Mack.) F.J.Herm.

- Carex piperi Mack. ex Piper & Beattie
- Carex pityophila Mack.
- Carex plana Mack.
- Carex platylepis Mack.
- Carex praeceptorum Mack.
- Carex projecta Mack.
- Carex proposita Mack.
- Carex purpurifera Mack.

= Carex laxiflora var. purpurifera (Mack.) Gleason

- Carex rectior Mack.
- Carex rhomalea Mack.
- Carex richii Mack.
- Carex rugosperma Mack.

= Carex tonsa var. rugosperma (Mack.) Crins

- Carex rusbyi Mack.

= Carex vallicola var. rusbyi (Mack.) F.J.Herm.

- Carex ruthii Mack.

= Carex muricata var. ruthii (Mack.) Gleason

- Carex salinaeformis Mack.
- Carex saximontana Mack.

= Carex backii var. saximontana (Mack.) B.Boivin

- Carex scabriuscula Mack.
- Carex scirpiformis Mack.

= Carex scirpoidea var. scirpiformis (Mack.) O'Neill & Duman

- Carex sheldonii Mack.
- Carex simulata Mack.

= Carex praegracilis var. simulata (Mack.) B.Boivin

- Carex smalliana Mack.
- Carex stellata Mack.

= Carex schiedeana var. stellata (Mack.) F.J.Herm.

- Carex stenochlaena (Holm) Mack.
- Carex stenoptera Mack.
- Carex sub-bracteata Mack.
- Carex suborbiculata Mack. in Abrams
- Carex substricta Mack.
- Carex swanii Mack.
- Carex teneraeformis Mack.
- Carex townsendii Mack.

= Carex echinata subsp. townsendii (Mack.) Reznicek

- Carex tracyi Mack.
- Carex tumulicola Mack.
- Carex uberior Mack.
- Carex unilateralis Mack.

= Carex athrostachya var. unilateralis (Mack.) B.Boivin

- Carex viridiflora Mack.
- Carex viridior Mack. in Abrams
- Carex wiegandii Mack.
- Carex wootonii Mack.
- Cymophyllus Mack.
- Cymophyllus fraseri (Andrews) Mack.
- Kobresia macrocarpa Clokey ex Mack.

= Kobresia bellardi var. macrocarpa (Clokey ex Mack.) H.D.Harr.

- Kobresia simpliciuscula Mack.

=== Other families ===
In other families, he described the following taxa:

Acanthaceae

- Gerardia flava var. calycosa (Mack. & Bush) Steyerm.

Adiantaceae

- Pellaea atropurpurea var. bushii Mack.

Alismataceae

- Echinodorus cordifolius var. lanceolatus (Engelm.) Mack. & Bush
- Sagittaria brevirostra Mack. & Bush

= Sagittaria engelmanniana subsp. brevirostra (Mack. & Bush) Bogin
Apiaceae

- Pseudotaenidia montana Mack.
- Pseudotaenidia Mack.

= Taenidia montana (Mack.) Cronquist
Compositae

- Aster parviceps Mack. & Bush in Mack.
- Senecio pseudotomentosus Mack. & Bush

= Packera paupercula var. pseudotomentosa (Mack. & Bush) R.R.Kowal

- Senecio semicordatus Mack. & Bush

= Senecio pseudaureus subsp. semicordatus (Mack. & Bush) G.W.Douglas & Ruyle-Douglas
= Packera pseudaurea var. semicordata (Mack. & Bush) Trock & T.M.Barkley
= Senecio aureus var. semicordatus (Mack. & Bush) Greenm.

- Smallanthus Mack.
- Smallanthus uvedalia (L.) Mack.
- Solidago [infragen.unranked] Argutae Mack.

= Solidago subsect. Argutae (Mack.) G.L.Nesom
= Solidago ser. Argutae (Mack.) G.L.Nesom

- Solidago edisoniana Mack.
- Solidago harperi Mack. ex Small
- Solidago longipetiolata Mack. & Bush

= Solidago nemoralis subsp. longipetiolata (Mack. & Bush) G.W.Douglas
= Solidago nemoralis var. longipetiolata (Mack. & Bush) E.J.Palmer & Steyerm.

- Solidago milleriana Mack. ex Small
- Solidago [infragen.unranked] Nemorales Mack.

= Solidago subsect. Nemorales (Mack.) G.L.Nesom

- Solidago notabilis Mack.
- Solidago [infragen.unranked] Odorae Mack.

= Solidago subsect. Odorae (Mack.) G.L.Nesom
= Solidago ser. Odorae (Mack.) Semple

- Solidago tarda Mack. ex Small
- Vernonia interior var. baldwinii (Torr.) Mack. & Bush in Mack.
- Vernonia interior var. drummondii Mack. & Bush
- Xanthium inflexum Mack. & Bush

Boraginaceae

- Macromeria thurberi (A.Gray) Mack.
- Onosmodium hispidissimum Mack.

= Onosmodium molle subsp. hispidissimum (Mack.) B.Boivin
= Onosmodium molle var. hispidissimum (Mack.) Cronquist
= Onosmodium virginianum var. hirsutum Mack.

- Onosmodium bejariense var. hispidissimum (Mack.) B.L.Turner
- Onosmodium hispidissimum var. macrospermum Mack. & Bush
- Onosmodium occidentale Mack.

= Onosmodium bejariense var. occidentale (Mack.) B.L.Turner
= Onosmodium molle subsp. occidentale (Mack.) Cochrane
= Onosmodium molle subsp. occidentale (Mack.) Cochrane
= Onosmodium molle var. occidentale (Mack.) I.M.Johnst.

- Onosmodium subsetosum Mack. & Bush in Small

= Onosmodium molle subsp. subsetosum (Mack. & Bush) Cochrane
= Onosmodium bejariense var. subsetosum (Mack. & Bush) B.L.Turner
= Onosmodium molle var. subsetosum (Mack. & Bush) Cronquist

- Onosmodium occidentale var. sylvestre Mack.

Campanulaceae

- Lobelia spicata var. leptostachys Mack. & Bush in Mack.

Caryophyllaceae

- Geocarpon Mack.
- Geocarpon minimum Mack.

Chenopodiaceae

- Chenopodium album var. berlandieri (Moq.) Mack. & Bush

Convallariaceae

- Uvularia nitida Mack.

Convolvulaceae

- Convolvulus sepium var. fraterniflorus Mack. & Bush

= Convolvulus fraterniflorus (Mack. & Bush) Mack. & Bush
= Calystegia fraterniflora (Mack. & Bush) Brummitt
= Calystegia sepium var. fraterniflora (Mack. & Bush) R.H.Mohlenbrock
= Calystegia silvatica subsp. fraterniflora (Mack. & Bush) Brummitt
Ericaceae

- Gaylussacia baccata var. glaucocarpa Mack.
- Vaccinium caesariense Mack.

= Vaccinium corymbosum f. caesariense (Mack.) Camp
Fabaceae

- Lespedeza acuticarpa Mack. & Bush
- Lespedeza manniana Mack. & Bush
- Lespedeza neglecta Mack. & Bush
- Lespedeza violacea var. prairea Mack. & Bush
- Lespedeza simulata Mack. & Bush

Haloragaceae

- Proserpinaca intermedia Mack.

Iridaceae

- Iris foliosa Mack. & Bush

Juncaceae

- Juncus coriaceus Mack.
- Juncus longicaudatus (Engelm. ex A.Gray) Mack.

Lamiaceae

- Scutellaria cordifolia var. pilosissima Mack. & Bush

Onagraceae

- Oenothera strigosa Mack. & Bush

= Oenothera biennis var. strigosa Rydb. in Mack.

- Onagra argillicola Mack.

= Oenothera argillicola Mack.
= Oenothera biennis f. argillicola (Mack.) B.Boivin
Poaceae

- Elymus canadensis var. robustus Mack. & Bush in Mack.
- Hystrix elymoides Mack. & Bush in Mack.
- Muhlenbergia polystachya Mack. & Bush

Polygonaceae

- Polygonum aviculare var. littorale (Link) Mack. & Bush

Portulacaceae

- Portulaca neglecta Mack. & Bush

Ranunculaceae

- Delphinium nortonianum Mack. & Bush

= Delphinium azureum var. nortonianum (Mack. & Bush) E.J.Palmer & Steyerm.
= Delphinium carolinianum var. nortonianum (Mack. & Bush) L.M.Perry

- Ranunculus sicaeformis Mack. & Bush

Rosaceae

- Crataegus mackenzii Sarg. in Mack.
- Prunus lanata (Sudw.) Mack. & Bush

Salicaceae

- Salix cordata var. missouriensis Mack. & Bush in Mack.

Saxifragaceae

- Heuchera puberula Mack. & Bush

= Heuchera parviflora var. puberula (Mack. & Bush) E.F.Wells

- Saxifraga incurva Mack. ex Ser.

Scrophulariaceae

- Aureolaria calycosa (Mack. & Bush) Pennell
- Dasistoma calycosum Mack. & Bush
- Gerardia calycosa (Mack. & Bush) Fernald

= Gerardia flava var. calycosa (Mack. & Bush) Steyerm.
Solanaceae

- Physalis missouriensis Mack. & Bush

= Physalis pubescens var. missouriensis (Mack. & Bush) Waterf.

- Physalis subglabrata Mack. & Bush

= Physalis longifolia var. subglabrata (Mack. & Bush) Cronquist
= Physalis virginiana var. subglabrata (Mack. & Bush) Waterf.
Ulmaceae

- Celtis mississippiensis var. pumila (Pursh) Mack. & Bush
