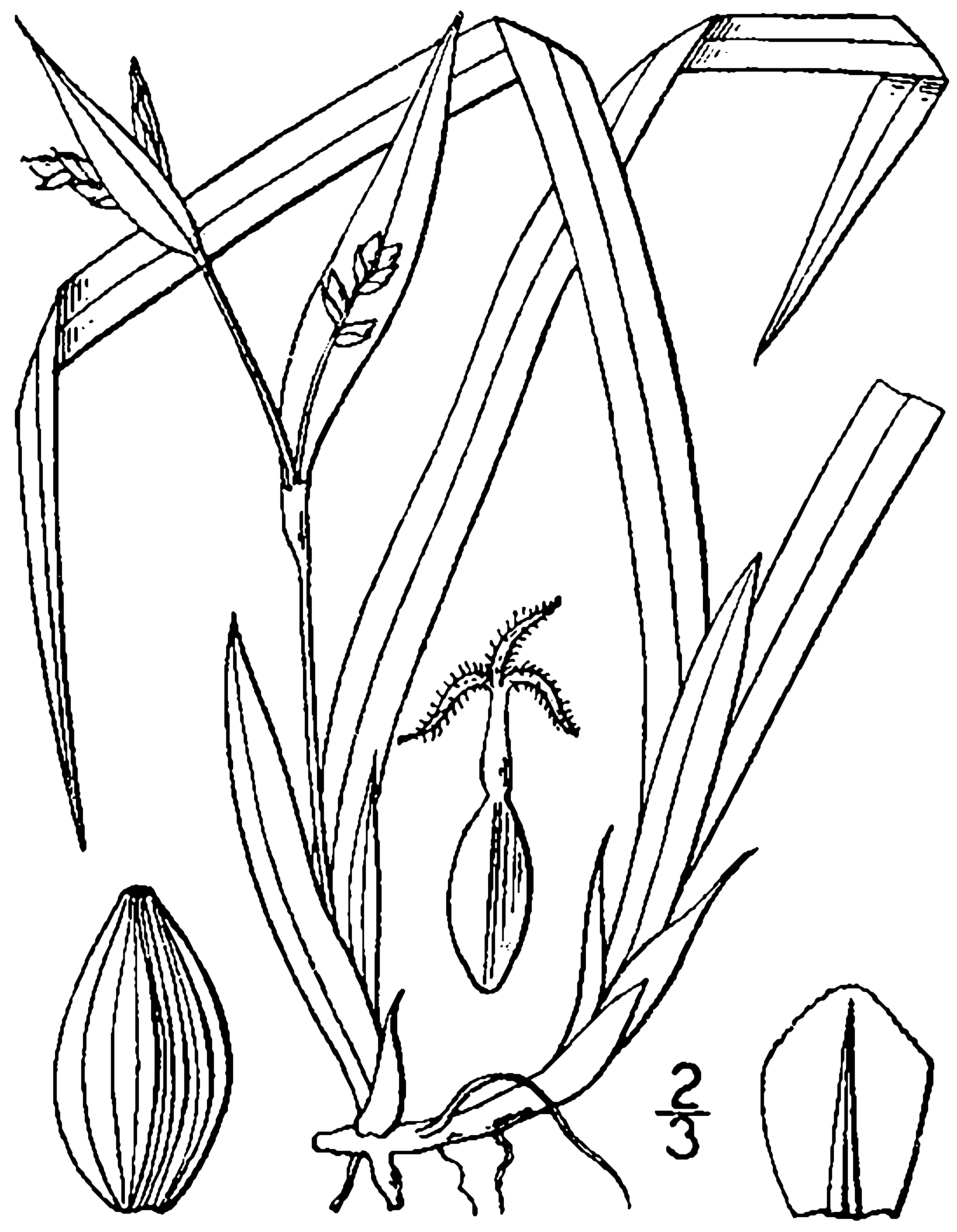

Scientific classification
- Kingdom: Plantae
- Clade: Tracheophytes
- Clade: Angiosperms
- Clade: Monocots
- Clade: Commelinids
- Order: Poales
- Family: Cyperaceae
- Genus: Carex
- Section: Carex sect. Careyanae
- Species: C. abscondita

Binomial name
- Carex abscondita Mack.
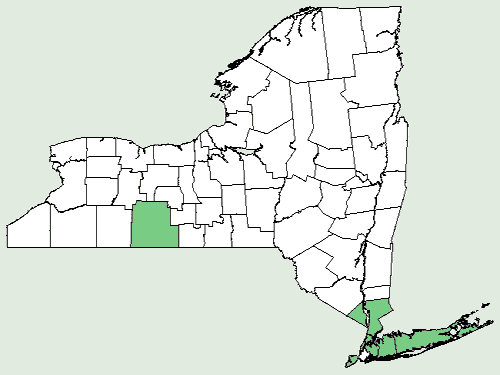
- Partial range, within New York State

Synonyms
- List: Carex ptychocarpa Steud.; Carex abscondita var. glauca (Chapm.) Fernald; Carex abscondita var. rostellata Fernald; Carex digitalis var. glauca Chapm.; Carex magnifolia Mack.; Carex ptychocarpa var. macrophylla L.H.Bailey

= Carex abscondita =

Species of plant in the sedge family

Carex abscondita, the thicket sedge, is a North American species of sedge first described by Kenneth Mackenzie in 1910.

== Distribution and habitat ==
It grows along the central and eastern United States, from eastern Texas to southern Missouri, east to the Atlantic coast, and north to New Hampshire. It grows in moist areas of forests, flood plains, shrublands, and swamps.

== Description ==
Carex abscondita is a tussock-forming perennial plant, grown from a rhizome. Leaves are green in colour, flat, smooth, with whitish sheaths. The lowest bract has a sheath in excess of 4mm. The lowest spike has a peduncle, while the uppermost spike bears only staminate flowers.

It is closely related to and sometimes confused with Carex digitalis, which, compared to Carex abscondita, has longer flowering stems relative to the leaves, wider staminate spikes, and often has thinner leaves.
