= Atlantic goldenrod =

Atlantic goldenrod is a common name for several plants and may refer to:

- Solidago arguta, native to eastern North America from Maine to Texas and inland to Illinois
- Solidago tarda, an uncommon plant found in the Atlantic coastal plain from New Jersey to Alabama
