= S. petiolaris =

S. petiolaris may refer to:

- Salix petiolaris, a species in the genus Salix
- Siparuna petiolaris, a species in the genus Siparuna
- Solidago petiolaris, a goldenrod species in the genus Solidago
- Stemonoporus petiolaris, a species of plant endemic to Sri Lanka
- Synaphea petiolaris, a species in the genus Synaphea

== See also ==
- Petiolaris (disambiguation)
