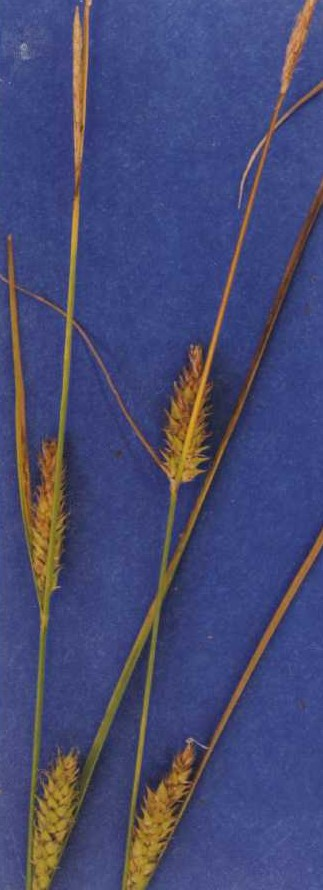

Scientific classification
- Kingdom: Plantae
- Clade: Tracheophytes
- Clade: Angiosperms
- Clade: Monocots
- Clade: Commelinids
- Order: Poales
- Family: Cyperaceae
- Genus: Carex
- Species: C. sheldonii

Binomial name
- Carex sheldonii Mack.

= Carex sheldonii =

Species of grass-like plant

Carex sheldonii is a species of sedge known by the common name Sheldon's sedge.

== Description ==
Carex sheldonii produces triangular stems up to a meter tall from a network of rhizomes. The narrow, hairy leaves attach to the stems by reddish purple sheaths. The inflorescence is a solid, narrow cluster of flowers up to 50 centimeters long, holding up to 100 developing fruits.

== Distribution and habitat ==
This sedge is native to the Western United States, where it grows in wet areas such as lakeshores and moist meadows.
