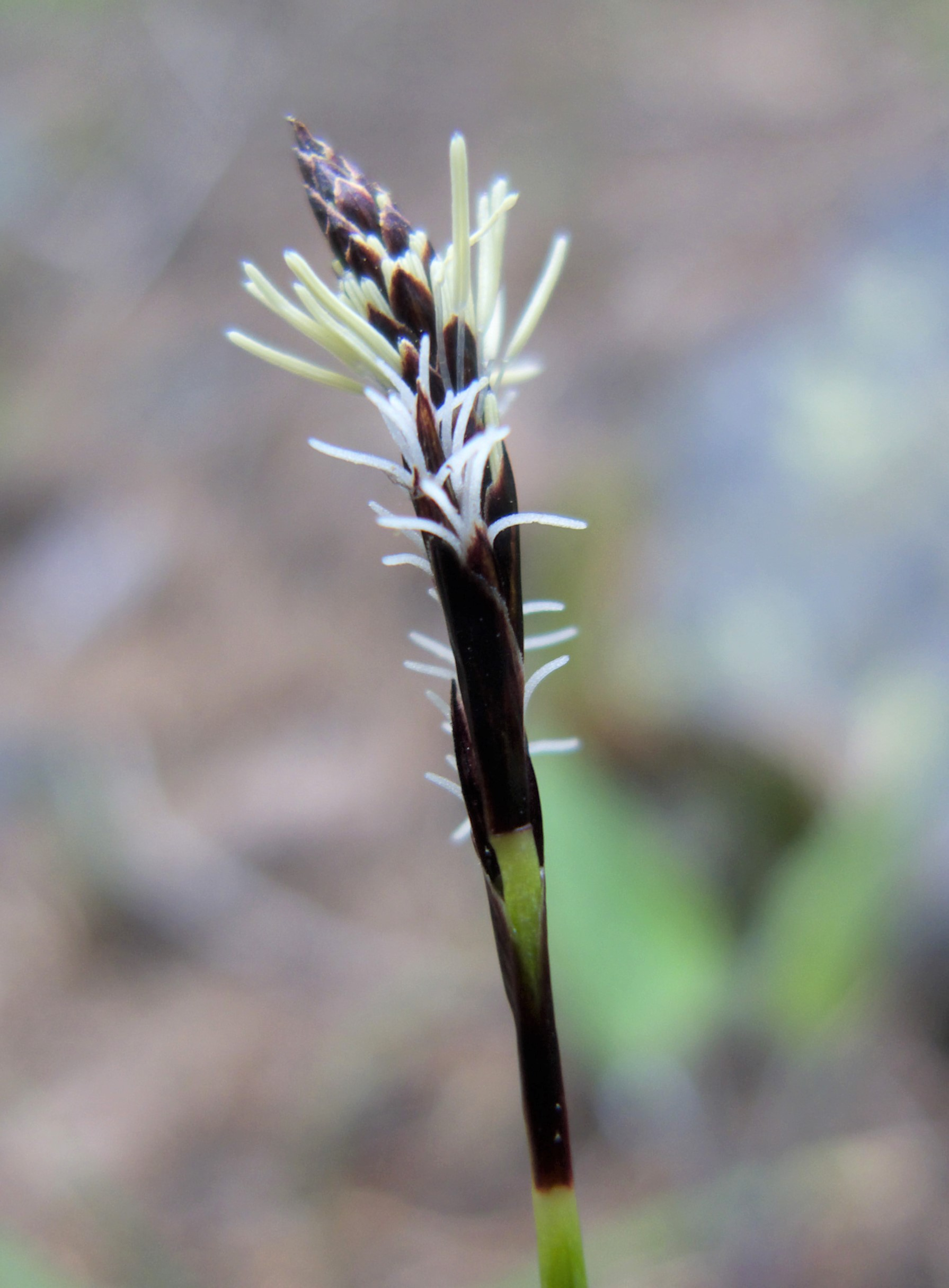
- Carex concinnoides near Mission Ridge, Chelan County Washington

Scientific classification
- Kingdom: Plantae
- Clade: Tracheophytes
- Clade: Angiosperms
- Clade: Monocots
- Clade: Commelinids
- Order: Poales
- Family: Cyperaceae
- Genus: Carex
- Species: C. concinnoides

Binomial name
- Carex concinnoides Mack.

= Carex concinnoides =

Species of sedge

Carex concinnoides is a species of sedge known by the common name northwestern sedge. It is native to western North America from British Columbia to California, where it can be found in moist or dry habitat, often in woodland and forested slopes, on silty and clay soils. This sedge produces loose clumps of stems up to about 35 centimeters in maximum height from long rhizomes. The leaves are thick but narrow, sickle-shaped, and pale green in color. Inflorescences occur at the stem tips, and some pistillate inflorescences grow from nodes along the stem. The spikelets have purplish bracts. The pistillate flowers have four stigmas on each pistil, an identifying characteristic. The fruit is coated in a sac called a perigynium, which is white to light brown in color, purple-tipped, and covered in hairs.

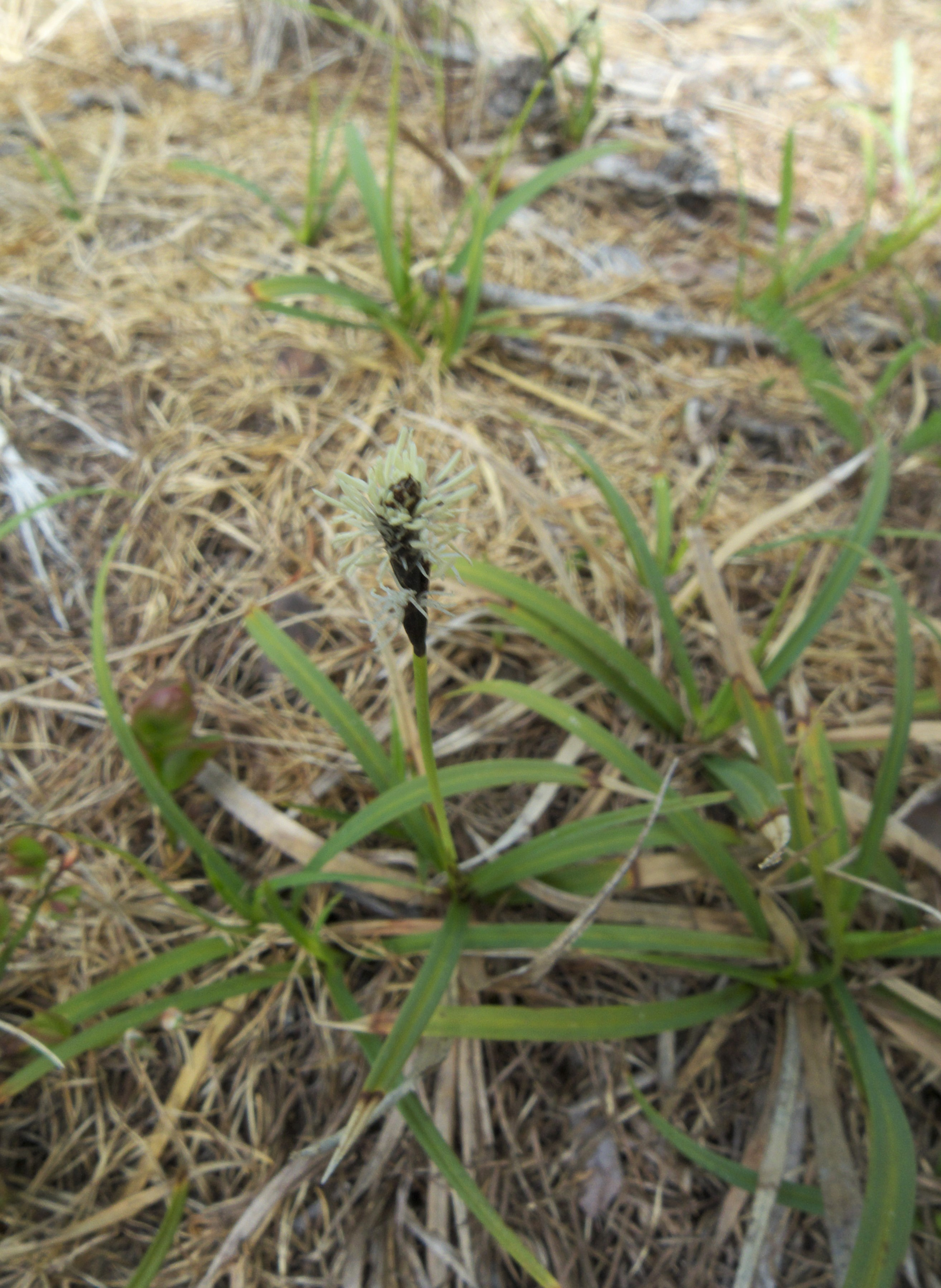
Carex concinnoides near Mission Ridge, Chelan County Washington
