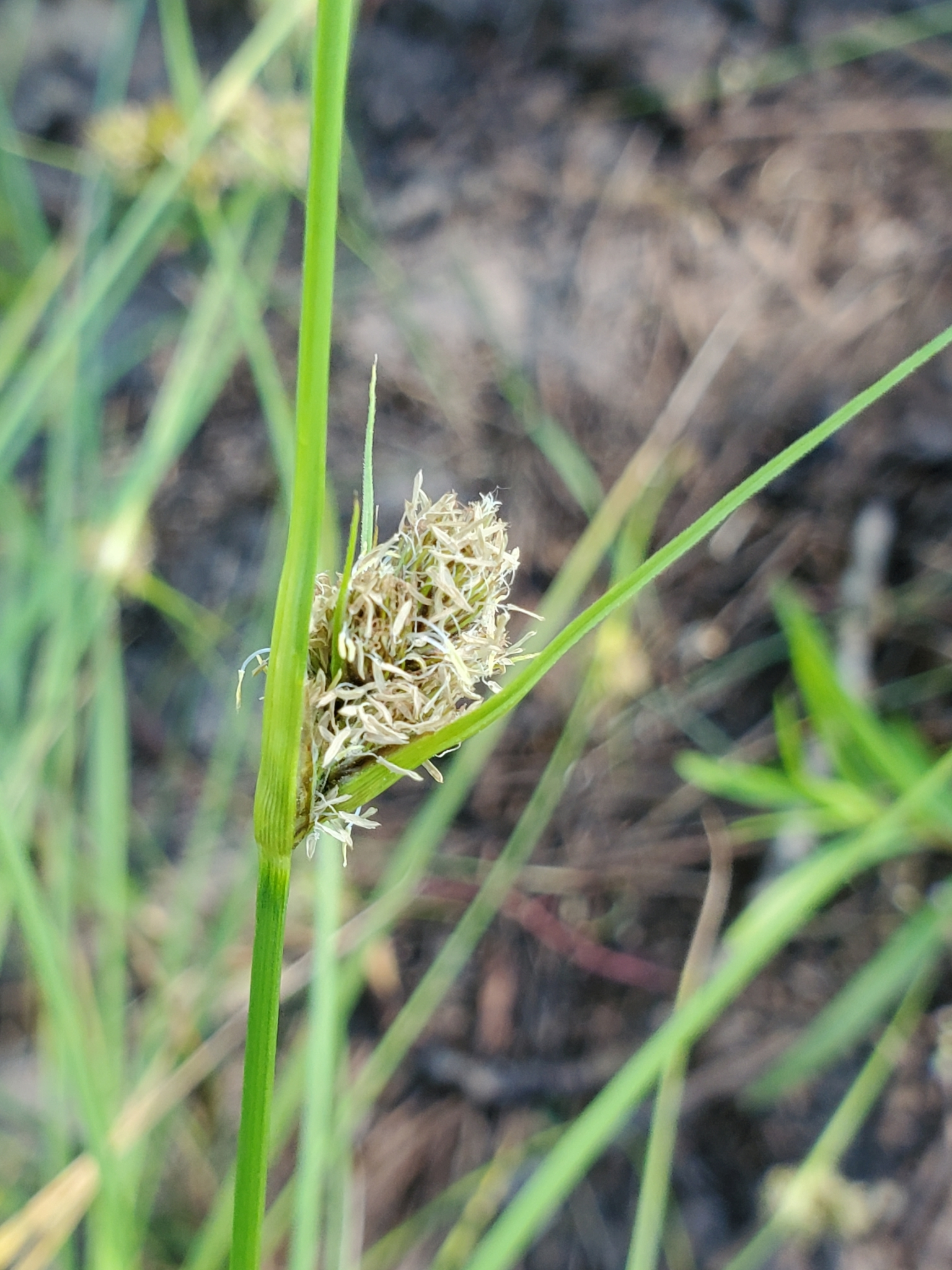

Conservation status
- Least Concern (IUCN 3.1)

Scientific classification
- Kingdom: Plantae
- Clade: Embryophytes
- Clade: Tracheophytes
- Clade: Spermatophytes
- Clade: Angiosperms
- Clade: Monocots
- Clade: Commelinids
- Order: Poales
- Family: Cyperaceae
- Genus: Carex
- Subgenus: Carex subg. Vignea
- Section: Carex sect. Ovales
- Species: C. unilateralis

Binomial name
- Carex unilateralis Mack.

Synonyms
- Carex athrostachya var. unilateralis (Mack.) B.Boivin

= Carex unilateralis =

Species of grass-like plant in the sedge family

Carex unilateralis, the lateral sedge, is a species of sedge that was first described by Kenneth Mackenzie in 1922. The specific epithet, unilateralis, is derived from Latin and means "one-sided".

== Description ==
Carex unilateralis is a low-growing, perennial, tussock-forming rhizomatous plant with a compact flower head. Bracts grow from 35–75 cm in height, and exceed the leaves in length. Leaves measure 2–3 mm in width. Inflorescence is generally angled to one side of the culm, making this species relatively easy to identify.

== Distribution and habitat ==
Carex unilateralis is common throughout southwestern Canada and the western USA. It prefers lowland, damp regions such as bogs, marshes and wetlands.
