= Carex biltmoreana =

Scientific classification
- Kingdom: Plantae
- Clade: Tracheophytes
- Clade: Angiosperms
- Clade: Monocots
- Clade: Commelinids
- Order: Poales
- Family: Cyperaceae
- Genus: Carex
- Species: C. biltmoreana

Binomial name
- Carex biltmoreana Mack.

Species of grass-like plant

Carex biltmoreana, known as Biltmore sedge, is a species of sedge that was first described by Kenneth Mackenzie in 1910. It is endemic to the southeastern United States, where it occurs in southwestern North Carolina, northwestern South Carolina, and northeastern Georgia. Biltmore sedge grows on rock outcrops, often on granite, and in adjacent woodlands.
