= Carex arctiformis =

Scientific classification
- Kingdom: Plantae
- Clade: Tracheophytes
- Clade: Angiosperms
- Clade: Monocots
- Clade: Commelinids
- Order: Poales
- Family: Cyperaceae
- Genus: Carex
- Section: Carex sect. Glareosae
- Species: C. arctiformis

Binomial name
- Carex arctiformis Mack.

Species of sedge

Carex arctiformis, the polar sedge, is a species of sedge native to sphagnum bogs and other wetlands in northwestern North America (British Columbia and southeastern Alaska).

It was first formally named by Kenneth Mackenzie in 1931.
