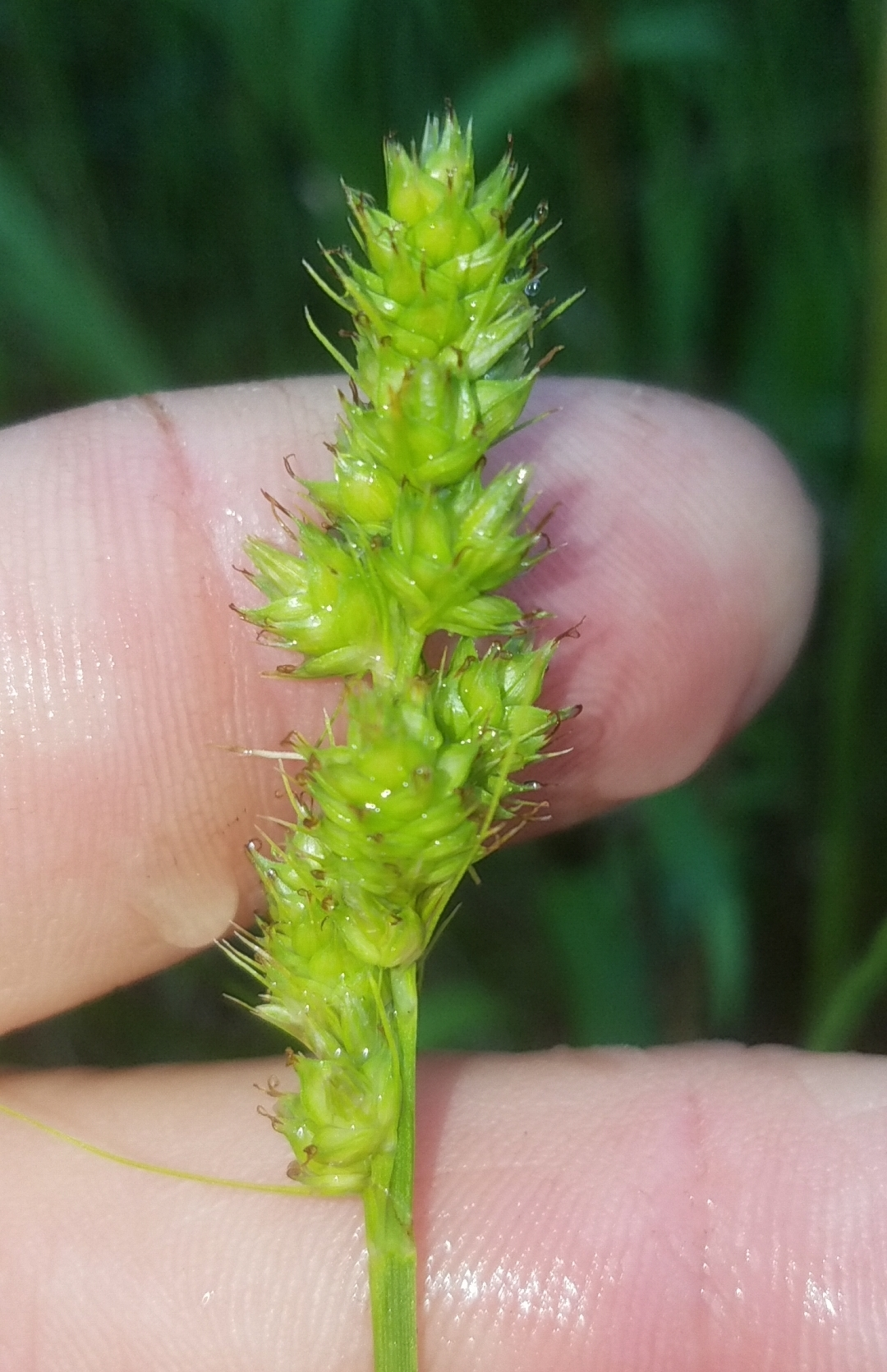
- In Parker County, Texas

Scientific classification
- Kingdom: Plantae
- Clade: Tracheophytes
- Clade: Angiosperms
- Clade: Monocots
- Clade: Commelinids
- Order: Poales
- Family: Cyperaceae
- Genus: Carex
- Section: Carex sect. Phaestoglochin
- Species: C. austrina

Binomial name
- Carex austrina Mack.

= Carex austrina =

Species of North American sedge

Carex austrina, known as southern sedge, is a species of sedge endemic to the southern and central United States.

It was first described as Carex muehlenbergii var. australis Olney ex L.H.Bailey in 1886.

== Distribution and habitat ==
Southern sedge grows in dry habitats, often in calcareous soils, such as prairies, roadsides, and forests. It occurs across the south-central United States, from Alabama to Nebraska, south to Texas. It may be introduced in parts of the eastern United States, where it has apparently spread with hay used in erosion control measures. It was first reported east of the Mississippi River in 1996.

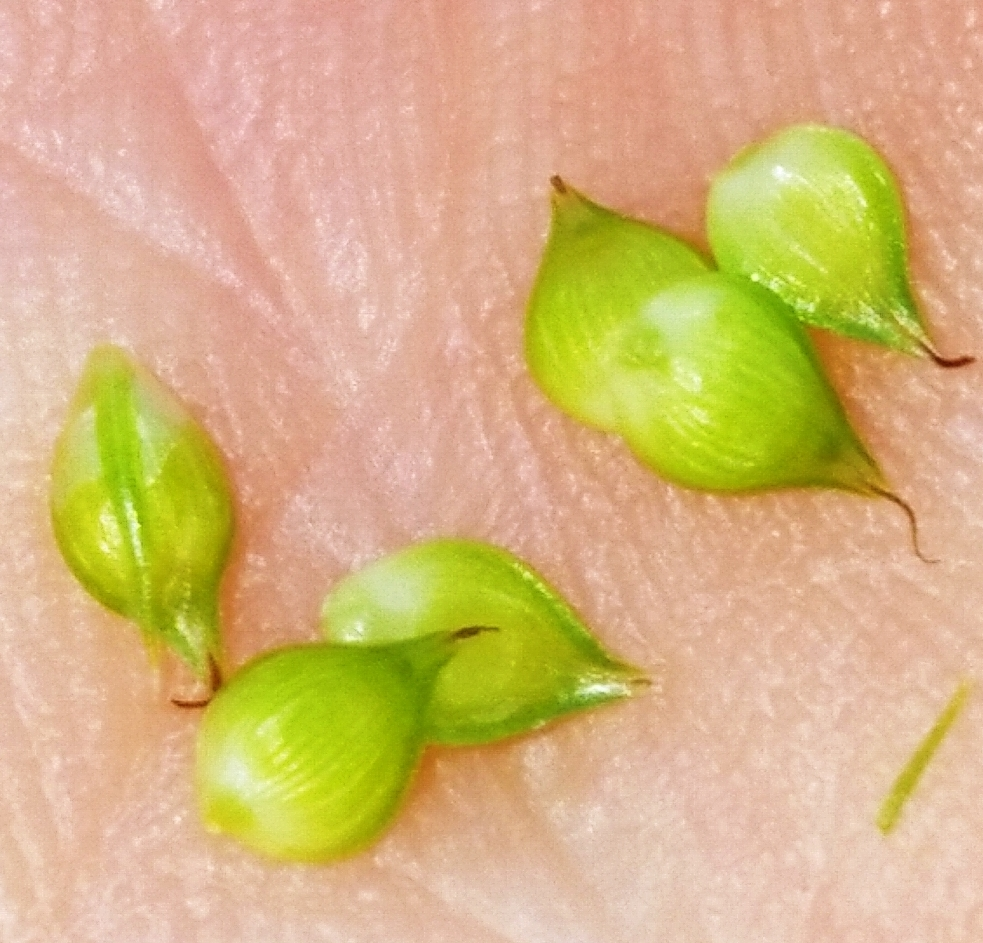
Perigynia
