= Carex aztecica =

Scientific classification
- Kingdom: Plantae
- Clade: Tracheophytes
- Clade: Angiosperms
- Clade: Monocots
- Clade: Commelinids
- Order: Poales
- Family: Cyperaceae
- Genus: Carex
- Species: C. aztecica

Binomial name
- Carex aztecica Mack.

Synonyms
- Carex fuscotincta Mack.

Species of grass-like plant

Carex aztecica is a species of flowering plant in the sedge family, Cyperaceae. It is native to Central America.

It was originally named Carex fuscotincta by Kenneth Kent Mackenzie in 1909. However, this name was already occupied by Carex fuscotincta Merino, so the species was renamed by Mack as Carex aztecica in 1935. Carex fuscotincta Merino is now considered a synonym of Carex caryophyllea.
