= Carex leptopoda =

Scientific classification
- Kingdom: Plantae
- Clade: Tracheophytes
- Clade: Angiosperms
- Clade: Monocots
- Clade: Commelinids
- Order: Poales
- Family: Cyperaceae
- Genus: Carex
- Species: C. leptopoda

Binomial name
- Carex leptopoda Mack., 1917

Species of sedge

Carex leptopoda, also known as slender-footed sedge and short-scale sedge, is a tussock-forming perennial in the family Cyperaceae. It is to Western Canada, United States, and Mexico.

== See also ==
- List of Carex species
