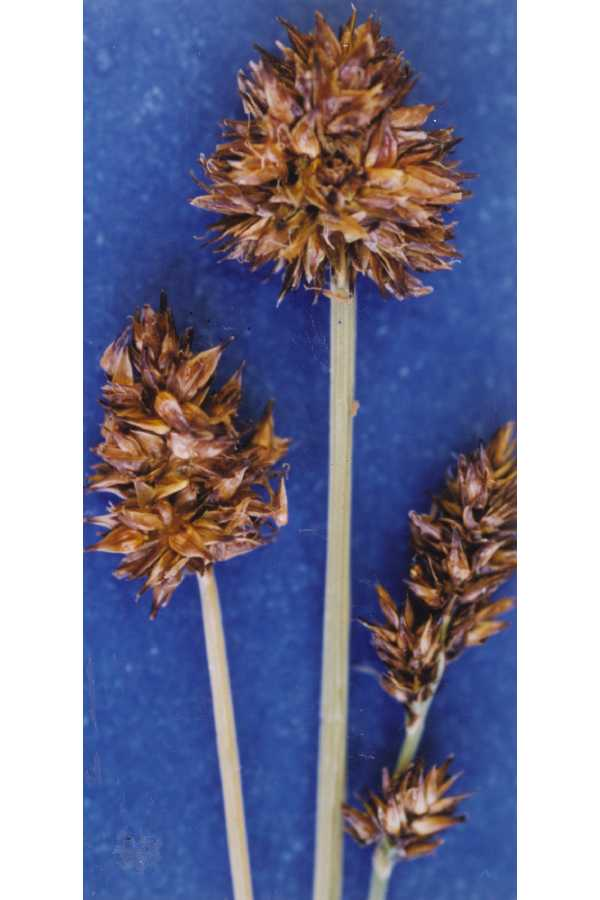

Scientific classification
- Kingdom: Plantae
- Clade: Tracheophytes
- Clade: Angiosperms
- Clade: Monocots
- Clade: Commelinids
- Order: Poales
- Family: Cyperaceae
- Genus: Carex
- Species: C. neurophora

Binomial name
- Carex neurophora Mack.

= Carex neurophora =

Species of grass-like plant

Carex neurophora is a species of sedge known by the common name alpine nerve sedge. It is native to the western United States, where it grows in wet mountain habitat such as meadows and streambanks. This sedge produces stems up to about 60 centimeters tall and inflorescences which are dense, oblong clusters of indistinguishable spikes of flowers.
