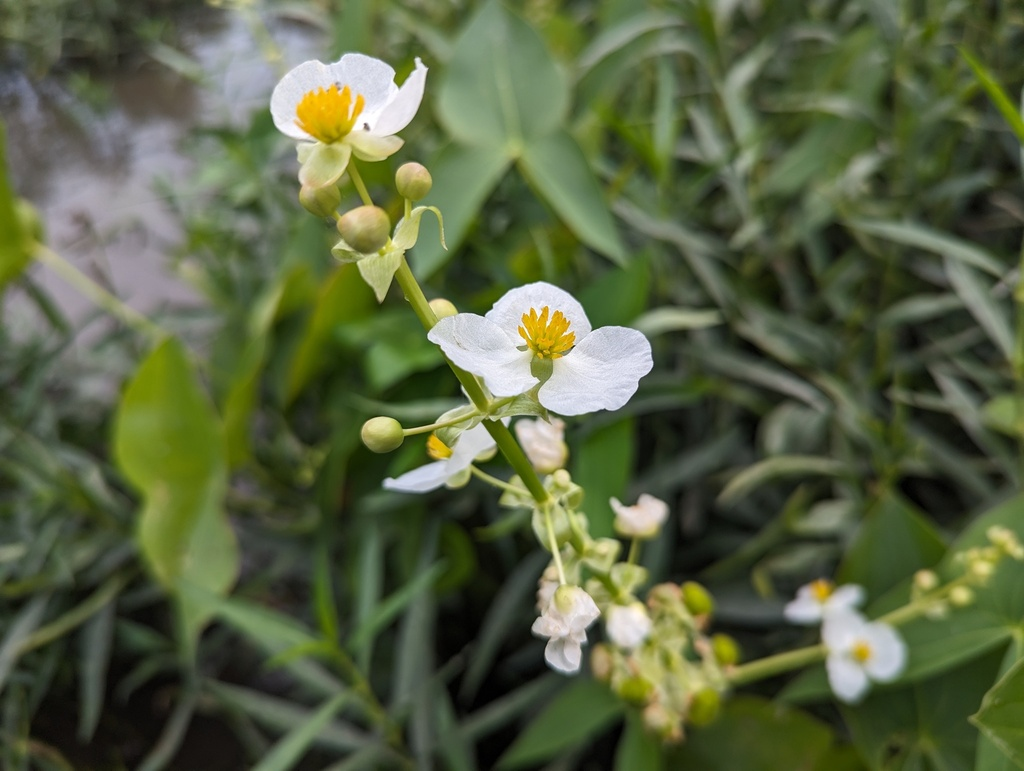

Conservation status
- Secure (NatureServe)

Scientific classification
- Kingdom: Plantae
- Clade: Tracheophytes
- Clade: Angiosperms
- Clade: Monocots
- Order: Alismatales
- Family: Alismataceae
- Genus: Sagittaria
- Species: S. brevirostra

Binomial name
- Sagittaria brevirostra Mack. & Bush

Synonyms
- Sagittaria engelmanniana subsp. brevirostra (Mack. & Bush) Bogin

= Sagittaria brevirostra =

Species of aquatic plant

Sagittaria brevirostra, common name Midwestern arrowhead or shortbeak arrowhead, is an aquatic plant species native to North America. It is a perennial herb growing up to 70 centimetres (28 inches) tall, with arrow-shaped leaves and white flowers.

It is common in wet places in an area stretching from Michigan and Ohio south to Alabama and west to North Dakota, Colorado and northern New Mexico, plus isolated populations in Maryland, New Brunswick, Virginia, Saskatchewan and California (Marin County). It can be found growing in shallow water along the edges of ponds, swamps, and waterways.
