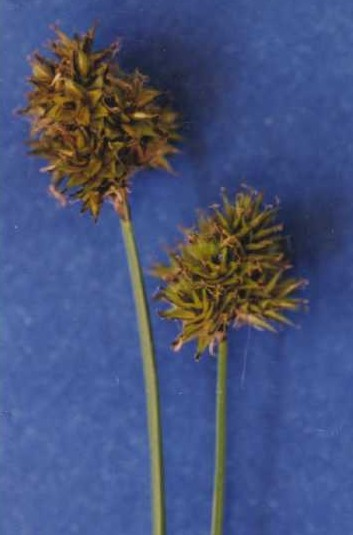

Scientific classification
- Kingdom: Plantae
- Clade: Embryophytes
- Clade: Tracheophytes
- Clade: Spermatophytes
- Clade: Angiosperms
- Clade: Monocots
- Clade: Commelinids
- Order: Poales
- Family: Cyperaceae
- Genus: Carex
- Subgenus: Carex subg. Vignea
- Section: Carex sect. Ovales
- Species: C. microptera

Binomial name
- Carex microptera Mack.

Synonyms
- Carex festivella Carex limnophila

= Carex microptera =

Species of grass-like plant

Carex microptera is a species of sedge known by the common name smallwing sedge. It is native to western North America, including most all of western Canada and the western United States. It occurs in moist mountain habitat such as meadows and riverbanks. This sedge produces dense clumps of erect stems over 20 centimeters tall and up to about a meter in height. The inflorescence is a dense cluster of green or brown spikes packed tightly and indistinct from each other.
