= Carex bulbostylis =

Conservation status
- Least Concern (IUCN 3.1)

Scientific classification
- Kingdom: Plantae
- Clade: Tracheophytes
- Clade: Angiosperms
- Clade: Monocots
- Clade: Commelinids
- Order: Poales
- Family: Cyperaceae
- Genus: Carex
- Species: C. bulbostylis

Binomial name
- Carex bulbostylis Mack.

Synonyms
- Carex amphibola var. globosa (L.H.Bailey) L.H.Bailey; Carex grisea var. globosa L.H.Bailey

Species of grass-like plant

Carex bulbostylis, known as the false hair sedge, is a species of sedge native to the southcentral and southeastern United States. It was first formally named by Kenneth Mackenzie in 1915. It is also known as the eastern narrowleaf sedge, thick style sedge, and globose sedge.

It has previously been treated as a variety of both Carex amphibola and Carex grisea.

== Distribution and habitat ==
Carex bulbostylis is endemic to the southern United States where it occurs from eastern Texas and Oklahoma to Mississippi, with a disjunct population in southwestern Tennessee.

It grows in a variety of habitats, from prairies to deciduous forests, floodplains and their adjacent slopes, and disturbed areas such as roadsides and grazed meadows. It is commonly found in calcareous areas.
