= Carex wootonii =

Scientific classification
- Kingdom: Plantae
- Clade: Tracheophytes
- Clade: Angiosperms
- Clade: Monocots
- Clade: Commelinids
- Order: Poales
- Family: Cyperaceae
- Genus: Carex
- Subgenus: Carex subg. Vignea
- Section: Carex sect. Ovales
- Species: C. wootonii

Binomial name
- Carex wootonii Mack.

Species of grass-like plant

Carex wootonii, or Wooton's sedge, is a species of sedge that was first described by Kenneth Mackenzie in 1915. Wooton's Sedge is a perennial or rhizomatous geophyte and grows primarily in Subtropical Biomes.

The plant is native to the US States of New Mexico and Arizona, as well as the Northeast of Mexico. It is placed by the native status of L48 N.
