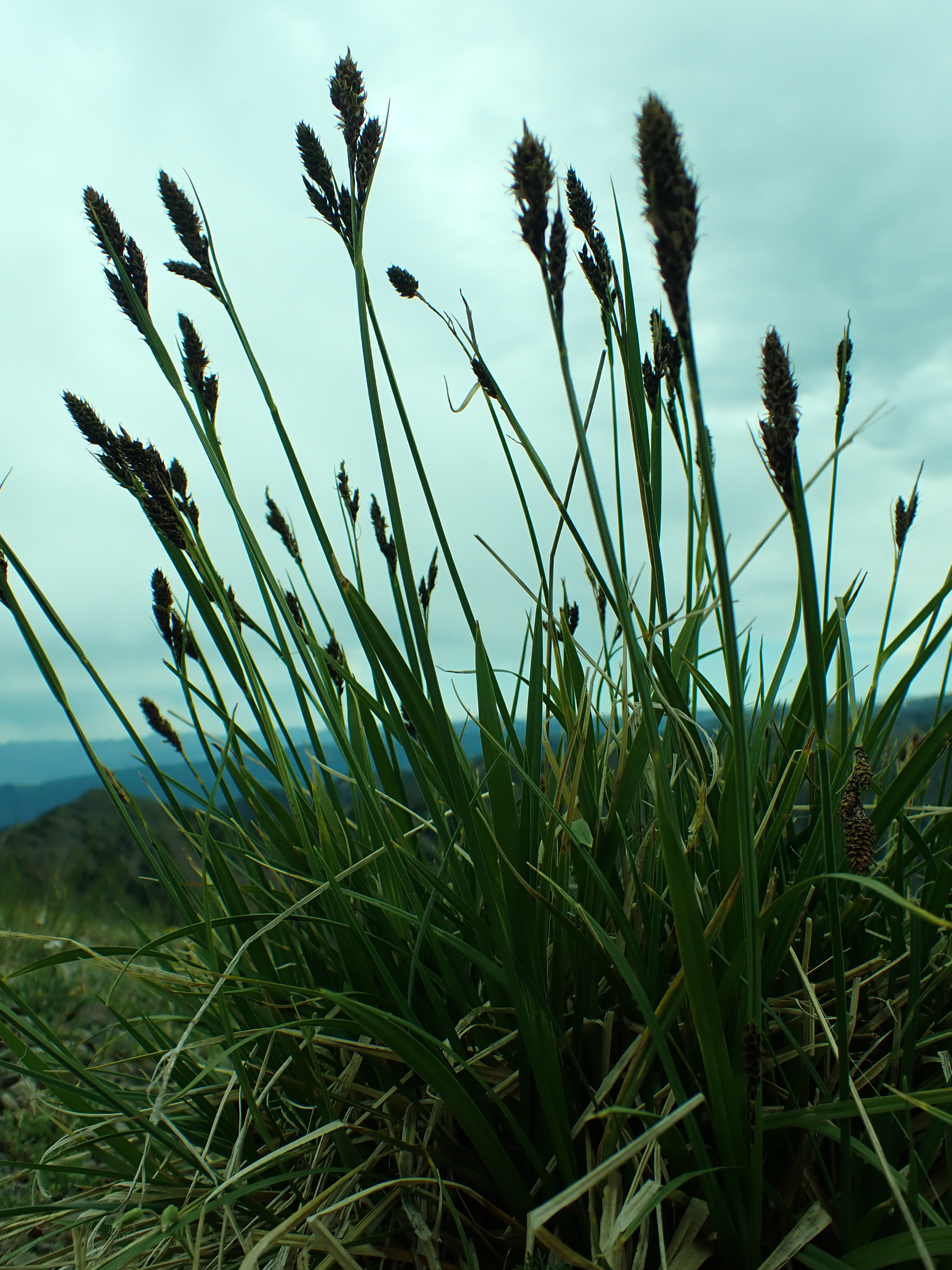

Scientific classification
- Kingdom: Plantae
- Clade: Tracheophytes
- Clade: Angiosperms
- Clade: Monocots
- Clade: Commelinids
- Order: Poales
- Family: Cyperaceae
- Genus: Carex
- Section: Carex sect. Racemosae
- Species: C. atrosquama

Binomial name
- Carex atrosquama Mack.

= Carex atrosquama =

Species of grass-like plant

Carex atrosquama, the lesser blackscale sedge, is a species of sedge described by Kenneth Kent Mackenzie in 1912. It is native to the northwestern United States and western Canada, from Alaska south to Utah and Colorado. It grows in alpine and subalpine meadows, or along rivers and streams in gravelly areas.
