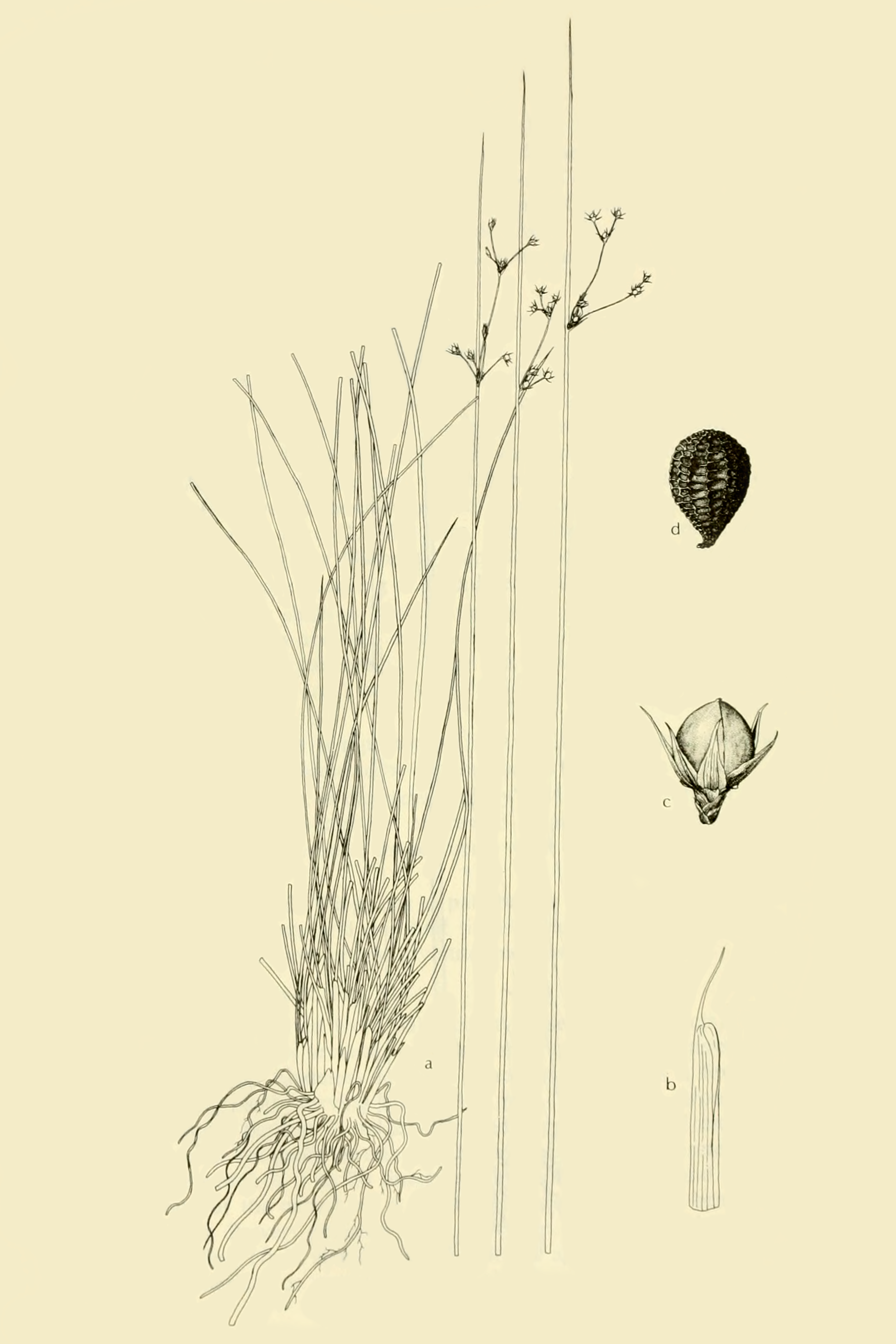
- Botanical illustration

Scientific classification
- Kingdom: Plantae
- Clade: Embryophytes
- Clade: Tracheophytes
- Clade: Spermatophytes
- Clade: Angiosperms
- Clade: Monocots
- Clade: Commelinids
- Order: Poales
- Family: Juncaceae
- Genus: Juncus
- Species: J. coriaceus

Binomial name
- Juncus coriaceus Mack.

= Juncus coriaceus =

Species of flowering plant

Juncus coriaceus, the leathery rush, is a species of flowering plant in the family Juncaceae, native to the southeastern United States, from Texas to Cape May, New Jersey. A report from New York state turns out to have been erroneous. A wetland species, it prefers poorly drained soils.
