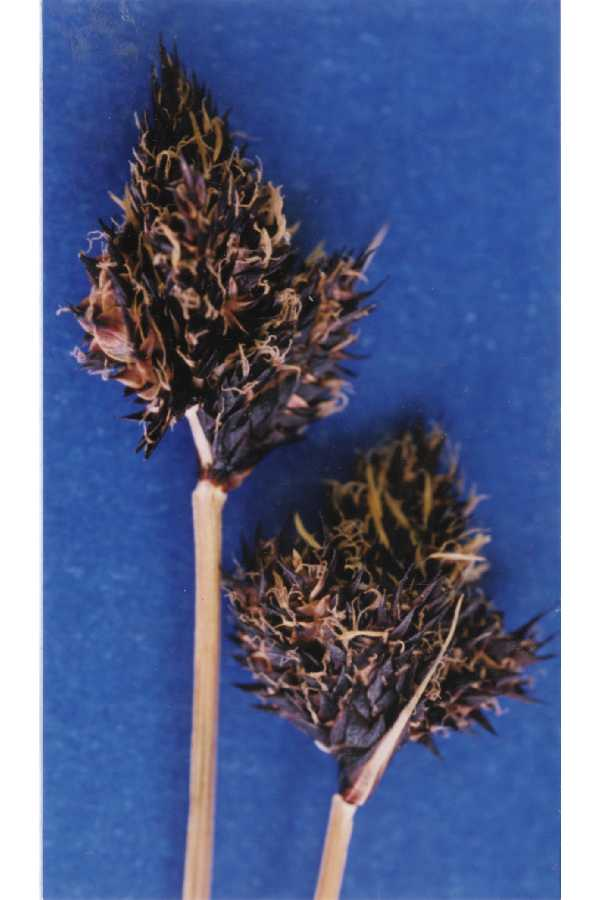

Scientific classification
- Kingdom: Plantae
- Clade: Tracheophytes
- Clade: Angiosperms
- Clade: Monocots
- Clade: Commelinids
- Order: Poales
- Family: Cyperaceae
- Genus: Carex
- Species: C. albonigra

Binomial name
- Carex albonigra Mack.

= Carex albonigra =

Species of sedge

Carex albonigra is a species of sedge known by the common name black and white sedge. It is native to western North America from Alaska and most of western Canada to California to New Mexico, where it grows in mainly dry, rocky high mountain habitat such as talus. This sedge forms a dense clump 10 to 30 centimeters in height with narrow gray-green leaves. The inflorescence is a headlike cluster of overlapping spikes. The fruit is coated in a sac called a perigynium which is dark purple to chestnut brown and often tipped with white.
