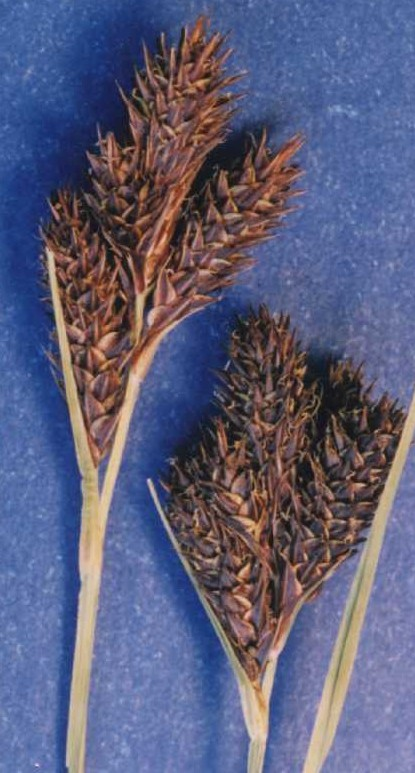

Scientific classification
- Kingdom: Plantae
- Clade: Tracheophytes
- Clade: Angiosperms
- Clade: Monocots
- Clade: Commelinids
- Order: Poales
- Family: Cyperaceae
- Genus: Carex
- Species: C. helleri

Binomial name
- Carex helleri Mack.

= Carex helleri =

Species of grass-like plant

Carex helleri is a species of sedge known by the common name Heller's sedge. It is native to eastern California and western Nevada, where it grows on rocky mountain slopes and in other habitats.

== Description ==
Carex helleri is a sedge producing dense clumps of thin, erect stems 30 to 50 centimeters in maximum height. The inflorescence bears overlapping spikes of flowers which are covered in dark brown or black scales. The fruit is covered in a perigynium which is reddish or purplish in color with a beak at the tip.
