= Carex gracilior =

Scientific classification
- Kingdom: Plantae
- Clade: Tracheophytes
- Clade: Angiosperms
- Clade: Monocots
- Clade: Commelinids
- Order: Poales
- Family: Cyperaceae
- Genus: Carex
- Subgenus: Carex subg. Vignea
- Section: Carex sect. Ovales
- Species: C. gracilior

Binomial name
- Carex gracilior Mack.

Species of grass-like plant

Carex gracilior, the slender sedge, is a species of sedge that was first described by Kenneth Mackenzie in 1917. It is native to California.
