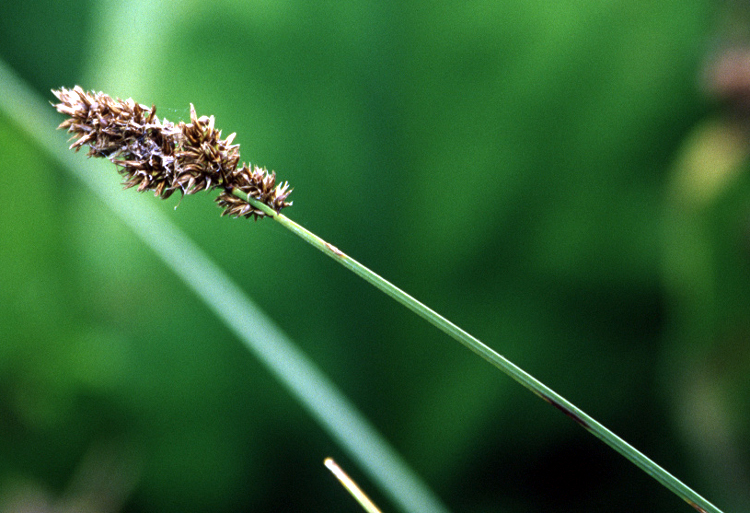

Conservation status
- Least Concern (IUCN 3.1)

Scientific classification
- Kingdom: Plantae
- Clade: Tracheophytes
- Clade: Angiosperms
- Clade: Monocots
- Clade: Commelinids
- Order: Poales
- Family: Cyperaceae
- Genus: Carex
- Species: C. cusickii

Binomial name
- Carex cusickii Mack. ex Piper & Beattie

Synonyms
- Carex obovoidea Cronquist. (1842).

= Carex cusickii =

Species of grass-like plant

Carex cusickii (common name, Cusick's sedge) is a type of grass-like plant in the family Cyperaceae. It is native to northwestern North America from British Columbia to California, and in Utah, where it can be found in several types of wetland habitat, such as marshes, mountain meadows, and ditches. In its range it is most common in the Cascade Range and areas to the west.

== Description ==
Carex cusickii is a tussock-forming plant, producing clumps of stems up to 1.3 metres tall. It is sometimes dioecious, with male and female flowers occurring on different individuals. The long leaves have sheaths dotted with red and edged at the top with copper. The inflorescence is often separated into distinct bunches of spikelets.

== Distribution and habitat ==
Carex cusickii favours a marshy, wet habitat such as fens, peatlands and shores, where it can sometimes be found on floating mats or on rotten logs.
