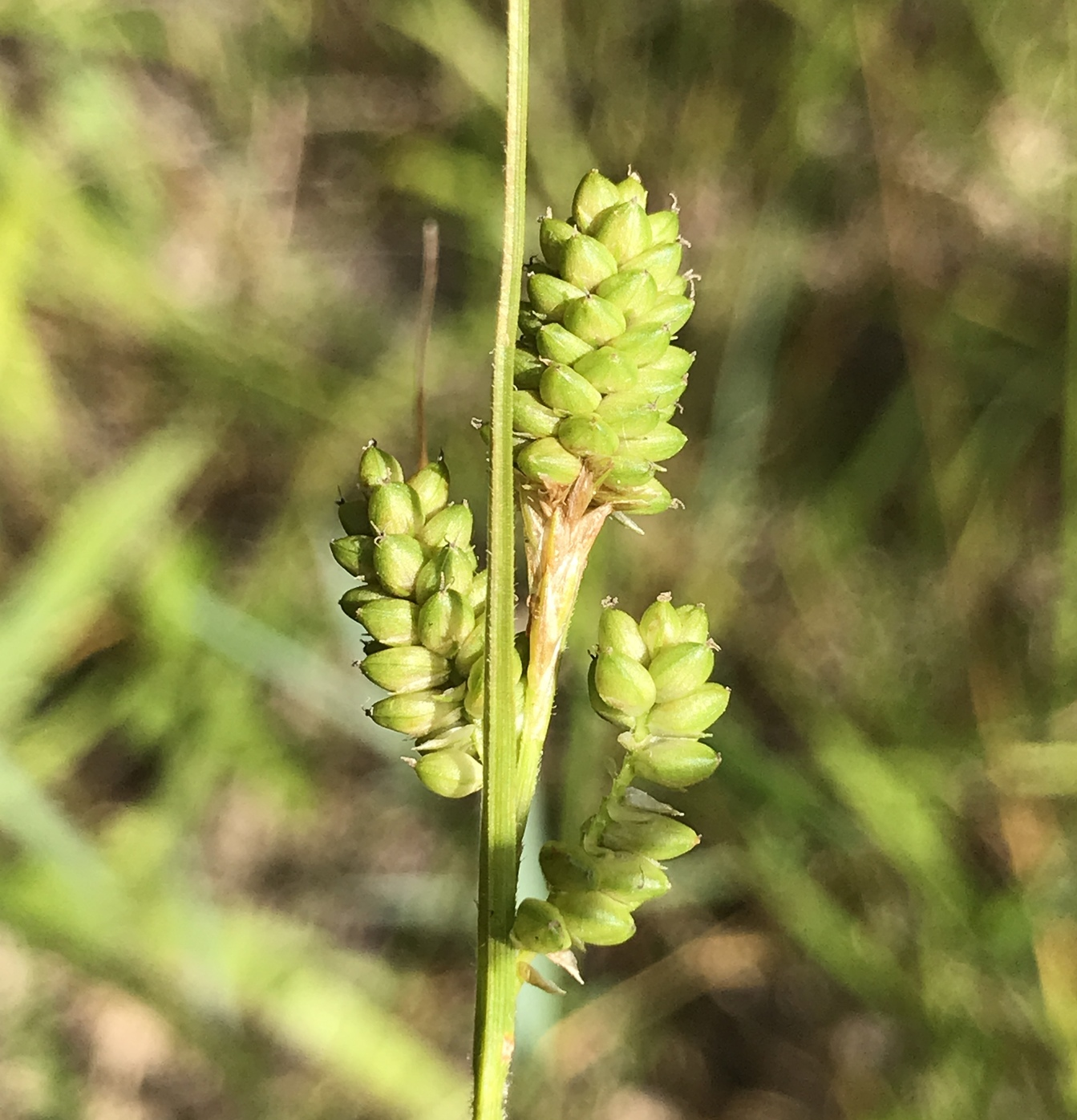
- At Cuyahoga Valley National Park in Ohio

Scientific classification
- Kingdom: Plantae
- Clade: Tracheophytes
- Clade: Angiosperms
- Clade: Monocots
- Clade: Commelinids
- Order: Poales
- Family: Cyperaceae
- Genus: Carex
- Section: Carex sect. Porocystis
- Species: C. hirsutella

Binomial name
- Carex hirsutella Mack.

= Carex hirsutella =

Species of grass-like plant

Carex hirsutella, the hairy green sedge or fuzzy wuzzy sedge, is a species of North American sedge that was first described by Kenneth Mackenzie in 1923. It ranges from Texas, throughout most of the central and eastern United States, north to Ontario and Quebec.
