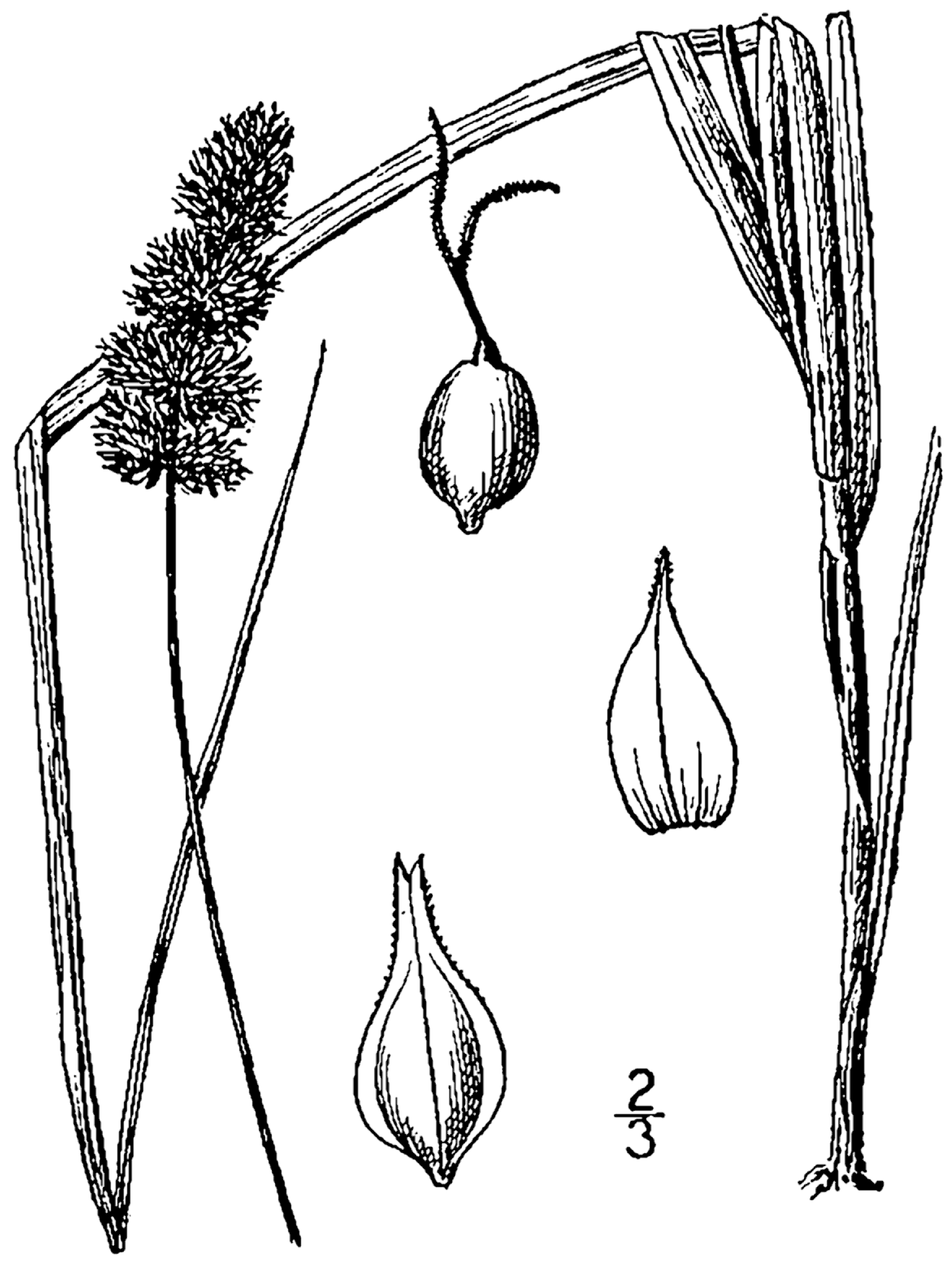
- Illustration from Britton & Brown's 1913 An illustrated flora of the northern United States, Canada and the British Possessions

Scientific classification
- Kingdom: Plantae
- Clade: Tracheophytes
- Clade: Angiosperms
- Clade: Monocots
- Clade: Commelinids
- Order: Poales
- Family: Cyperaceae
- Genus: Carex
- Species: C. aggregata

Binomial name
- Carex aggregata Mack.

Synonyms
- Carex agglomerata Mack.; Carex sparganioides var. aggregata (Mack.) Gleason

= Carex aggregata =

Species of grass-like plant

Carex aggregata is a species of sedge that was first described by Kenneth Mackenzie in 1910. It is native to the eastern United States and Canada.
