= Carex integra =

Scientific classification
- Kingdom: Plantae
- Clade: Tracheophytes
- Clade: Angiosperms
- Clade: Monocots
- Clade: Commelinids
- Order: Poales
- Family: Cyperaceae
- Genus: Carex
- Subgenus: Carex subg. Vignea
- Section: Carex sect. Ovales
- Species: C. integra

Binomial name
- Carex integra Mack.

Species of grass-like plant

Carex integra, the smoothbeak sedge, is a species of sedge that was first described by Kenneth Mackenzie in 1917.
