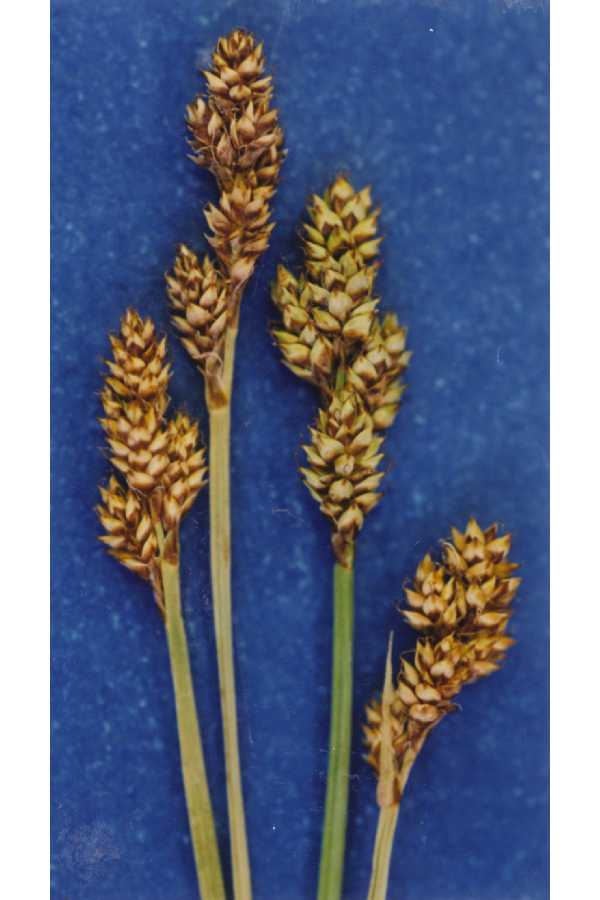

Scientific classification
- Kingdom: Plantae
- Clade: Tracheophytes
- Clade: Angiosperms
- Clade: Monocots
- Clade: Commelinids
- Order: Poales
- Family: Cyperaceae
- Genus: Carex
- Species: C. praeceptorum

Binomial name
- Carex praeceptorum Mack.

= Carex praeceptorum =

Species of grass-like plant

Carex praeceptorum (orth.var. C. praeceptorium) is a species of sedge known by the common names early sedge and teacher's sedge.

== Distribution ==
It is native to much of western North America, from British Columbia to California to Colorado, where it grows in wet, marshy habitat such as bogs and lakeshores.

== Description ==
This sedge produces small clumps of short, grasslike stems 10 to 30 centimeters tall from a thin network of rhizomes. The thin, grayish to pale green leaves are up to about 15 centimeters in length but shorter than the stems. The inflorescence is a small, dense bundle of a few brown flower spikes. The fruit is coated in a dark colored perigynium.
