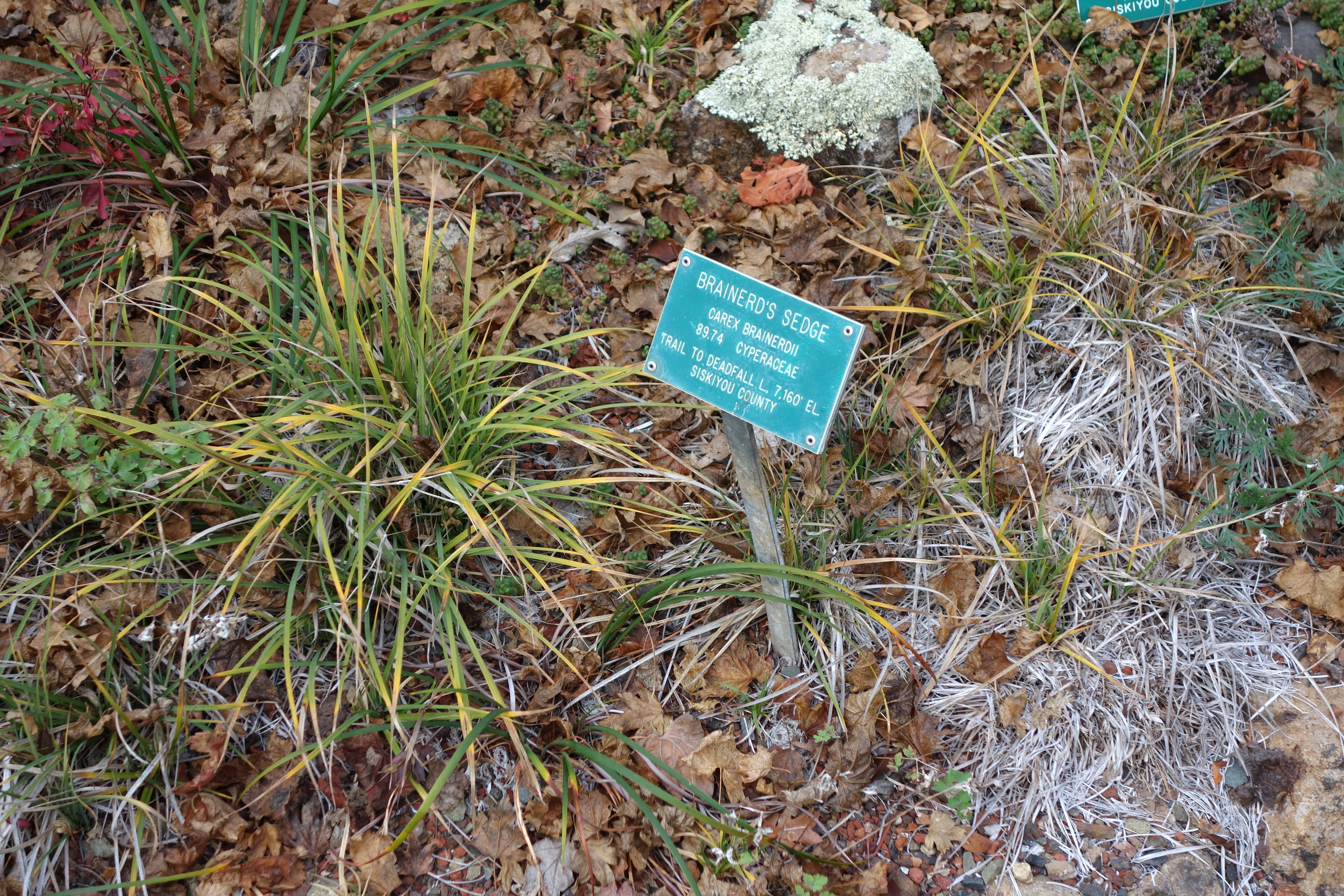

Scientific classification
- Kingdom: Plantae
- Clade: Tracheophytes
- Clade: Angiosperms
- Clade: Monocots
- Clade: Commelinids
- Order: Poales
- Family: Cyperaceae
- Genus: Carex
- Species: C. brainerdii

Binomial name
- Carex brainerdii Mack.

= Carex brainerdii =

Species of grass-like plant

Carex brainerdii, or Brainerd's sedge, is a species of sedge that was first described by Kenneth Mackenzie in 1913. It is native to California and Oregon.
