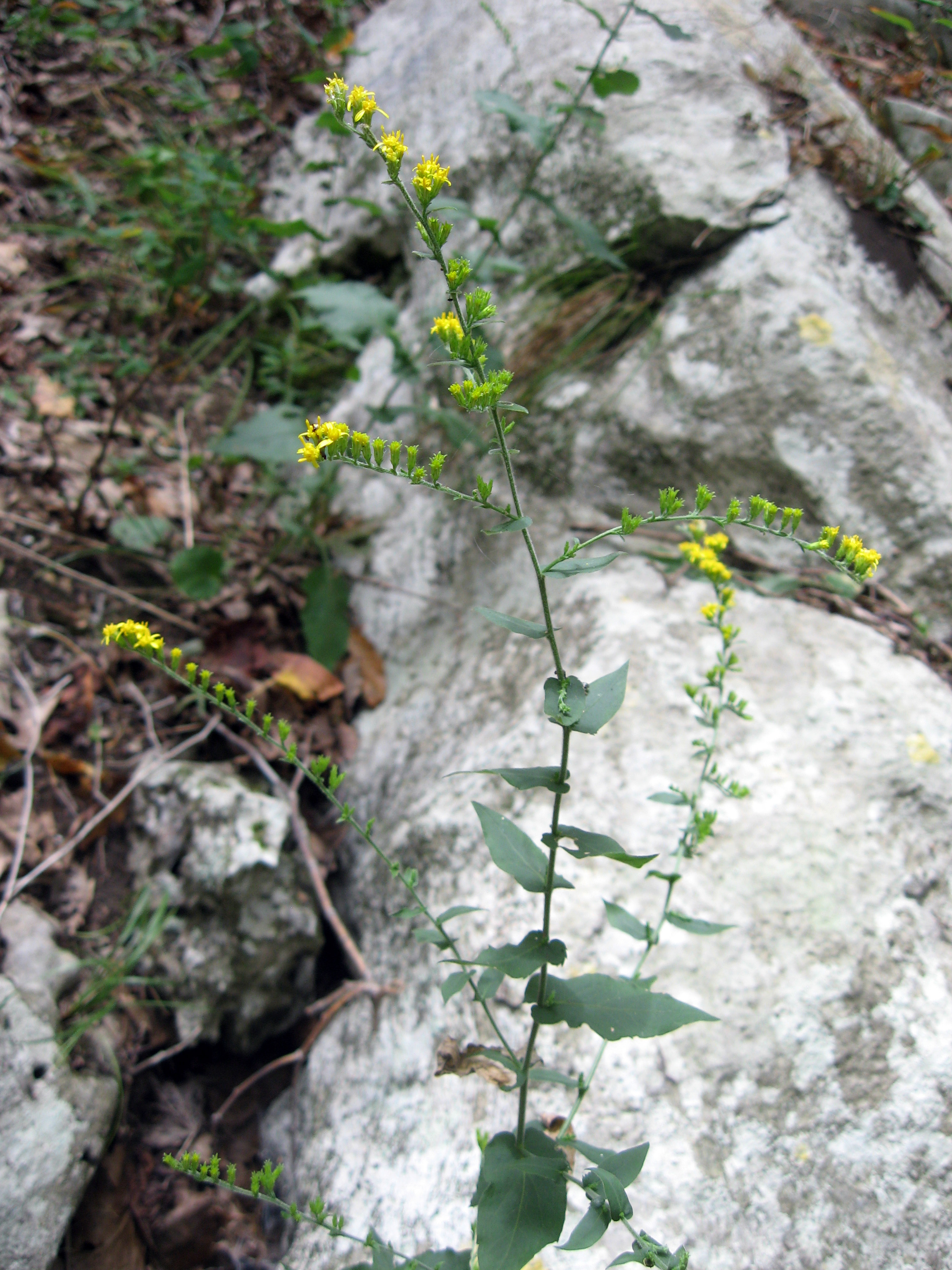
- Cumberland Escarpment in Tennessee

Scientific classification
- Kingdom: Plantae
- Clade: Tracheophytes
- Clade: Angiosperms
- Clade: Eudicots
- Clade: Asterids
- Order: Asterales
- Family: Asteraceae
- Genus: Solidago
- Species: S. auriculata

Binomial name
- Solidago auriculata Shuttleworth ex S.F.Blake 1931

Synonyms
- Solidago amplexicaulis Torr. & A.Gray 1842 not M.Martens 1841; Solidago notabilis Mack. ex Small

= Solidago auriculata =

Species of flowering plant

Solidago auriculata, commonly called clasping goldenrod or eared goldenrod, is a species of flowering plant native to the southeastern and south-central United States from South Carolina west as far as eastern Texas and southeastern Oklahoma. It has a patchy distribution and is mostly found in rocky forests over calcareous rocks, although it can be along streams.

Solidago auriculata is a perennial plant up to 150 cm (5 feet) tall, spreading by means of underground rhizomes. One plant produces sometimes as many as 100 small yellow flower heads in late summer and fall.
