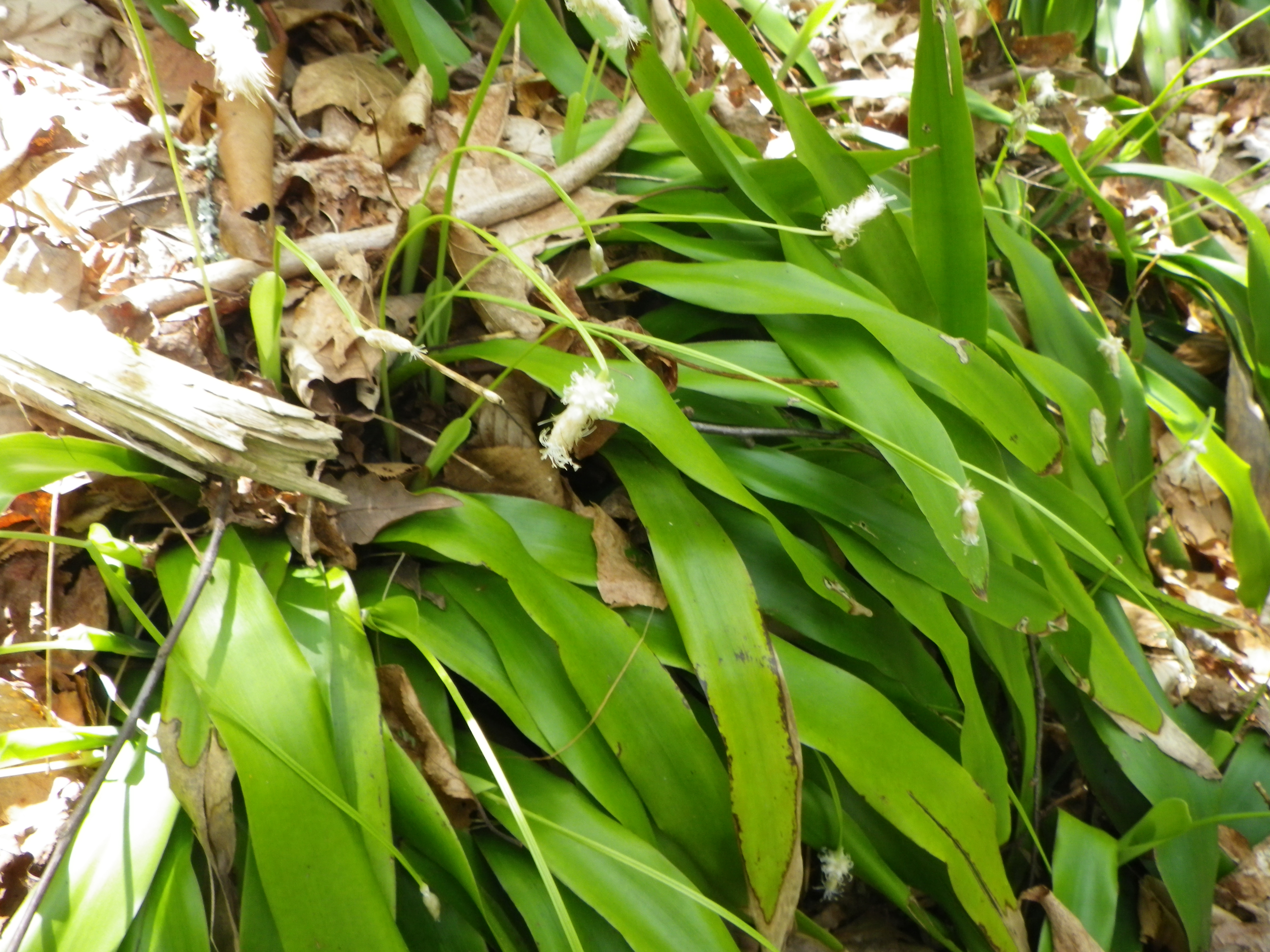

Conservation status
- Apparently Secure (NatureServe)

Scientific classification
- Kingdom: Plantae
- Clade: Tracheophytes
- Clade: Angiosperms
- Clade: Monocots
- Clade: Commelinids
- Order: Poales
- Family: Cyperaceae
- Genus: Carex
- Species: C. fraseriana

Binomial name
- Carex fraseriana Ker Gawl.

Synonyms
- Cymophyllus fraserianus (Ker Gawl.) Kartesz & Gandhi; Carex fraseri Andrews; Carex lagopus Muhl.; Olamblis fraseri (Andrews) Raf.; Cymophyllus fraseri (Andrews) Mack. in Britton & A.Br.

= Carex fraseriana =

Genus of grass-like plants

Carex fraseriana is a perennial member of the sedge family with the common name Fraser's sedge. It was the only species of the genus Cymophyllus before it was re-transferred to Carex.

Carex fraseriana is native to the Great Smoky Mountains and southern Appalachian region of the southeastern United States. It is endangered in Pennsylvania, Kentucky, Maryland and Georgia.
