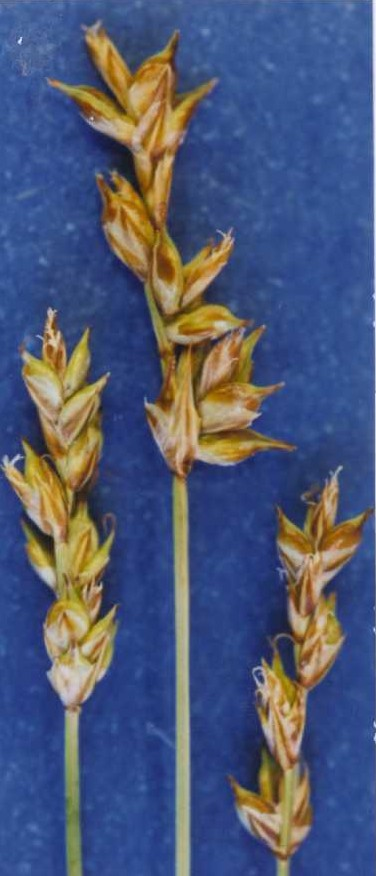

Scientific classification
- Kingdom: Plantae
- Clade: Tracheophytes
- Clade: Angiosperms
- Clade: Monocots
- Clade: Commelinids
- Order: Poales
- Family: Cyperaceae
- Genus: Carex
- Species: C. vallicola

Binomial name
- Carex vallicola Dewey

Synonyms
- Carex rusbyi

= Carex vallicola =

Species of grass-like plant

Carex vallicola is a species of sedge known by the common name valley sedge. It is native to western North America from British Columbia to New Mexico, where it grows in many types of moist and dry habitat, including forest and grassland. This sedge produces clumps of stems up to about 60 centimeters tall. The inflorescence is a crowded cluster of a few flower spikes. The fruit is enclosed in a brown perigynium.
