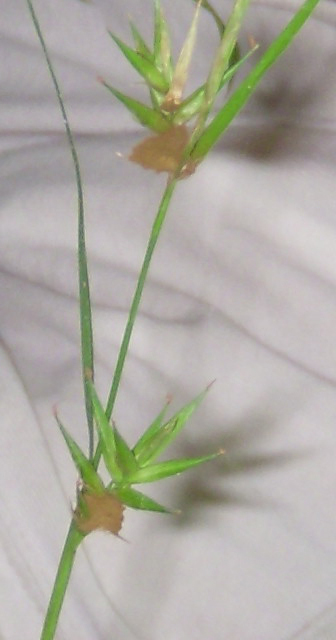
- The brown growths are from an infection with Farysia thuemenii, a smut fungus

Scientific classification
- Kingdom: Plantae
- Clade: Tracheophytes
- Clade: Angiosperms
- Clade: Monocots
- Clade: Commelinids
- Order: Poales
- Family: Cyperaceae
- Genus: Carex
- Species: C. lonchocarpa

Binomial name
- Carex lonchocarpa Willd. ex Spreng.

Synonyms
- Carex folliculata var. australis L.H.Bailey; Carex smalliana Mack.

= Carex lonchocarpa =

Species of grass-like plant

Carex lonchocarpa, the southern long sedge, is a species of flowering plant in the family Cyperaceae, native to Texas and the southeastern US. A perennial reaching 4 ft (120 cm), it can be found in a wide variety of wet habitats, on sand, peat, or acid soils.
