= Solidago tarda =

Scientific classification
- Kingdom: Plantae
- Clade: Tracheophytes
- Clade: Angiosperms
- Clade: Eudicots
- Clade: Asterids
- Order: Asterales
- Family: Asteraceae
- Genus: Solidago
- Species: S. tarda

Binomial name
- Solidago tarda Mack. ex Small 1933

Species of flowering plant

Solidago tarda, commonly known as Atlantic goldenrod, is a rare North American species of goldenrod in the family Asteraceae. It is found along the Atlantic coastal plain from New Jersey and Alabama, though nowhere very common.

== Description ==
Solidago tarda is a perennial herb up to 180 cm (6 feet) tall, with a branching underground caudex or rhizomes. Leaves are elliptic or egg-shaped, up to 35 cm (14 inches) long near the base of the plant, and shorter higher up the stem.

One plant can produce as many as 50 small yellow flower heads in a narrow, elongate array at the top of the plant.
