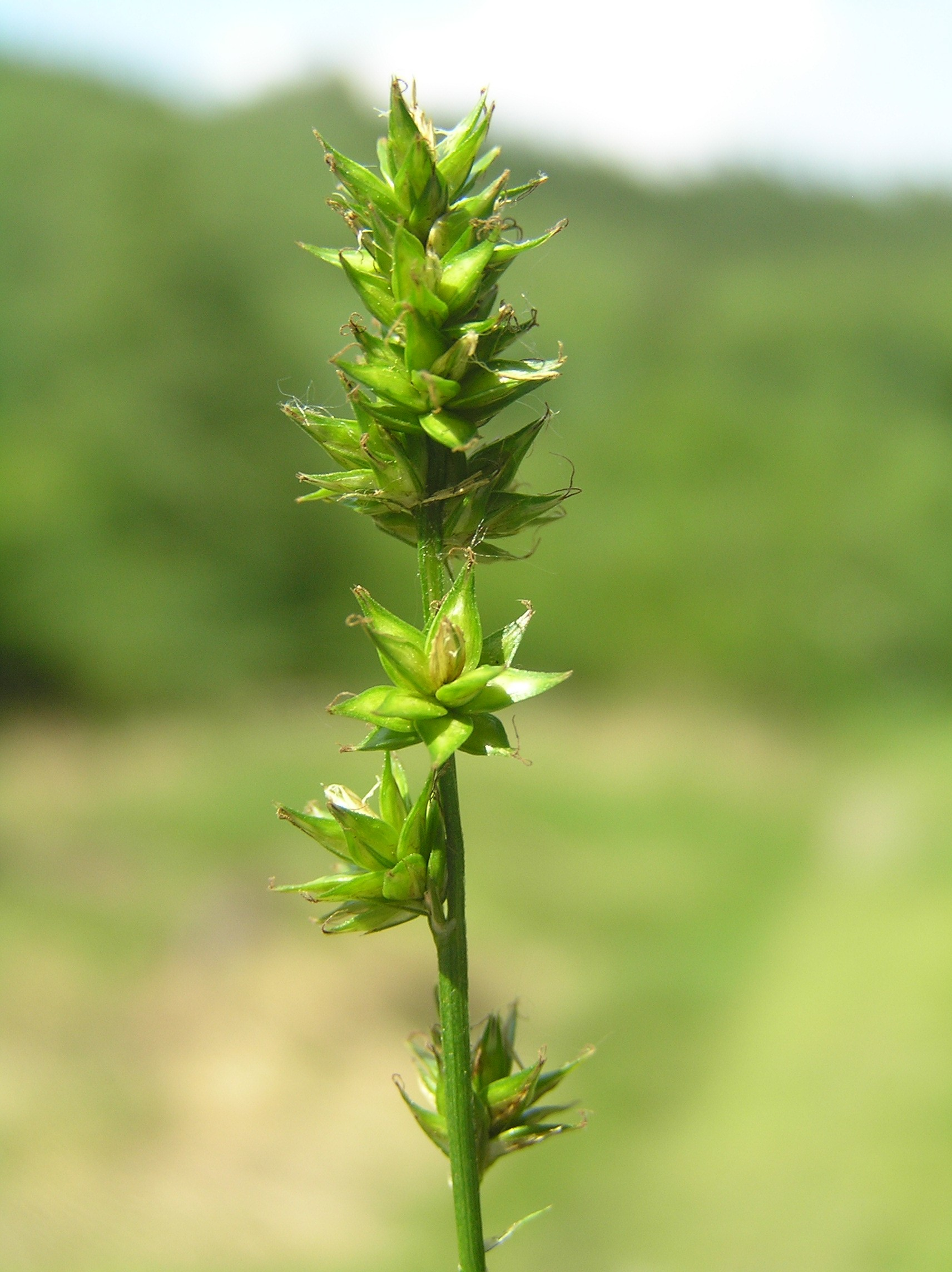
- Inflorescence
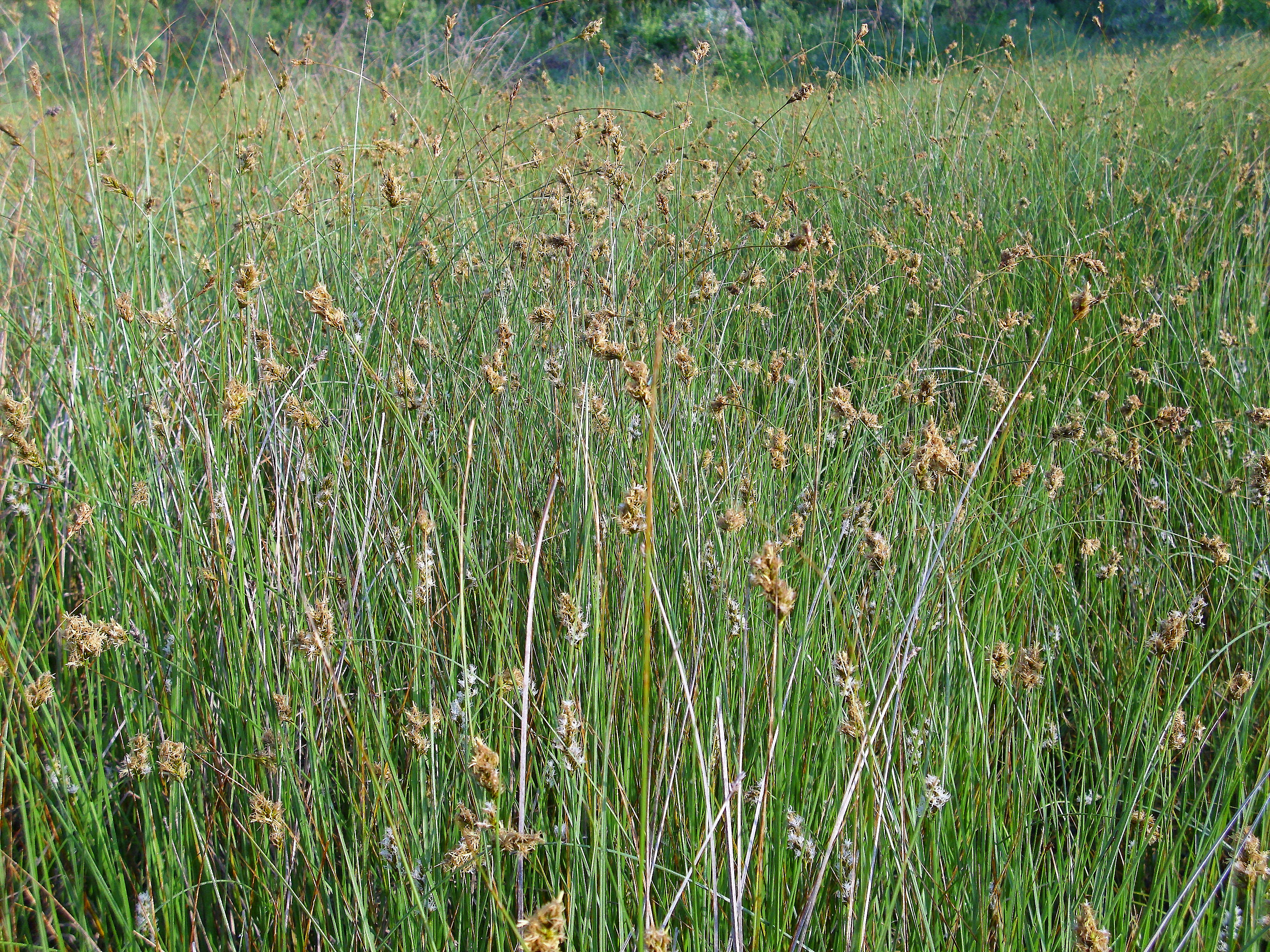
- In a field in Spain

Scientific classification
- Kingdom: Plantae
- Clade: Tracheophytes
- Clade: Angiosperms
- Clade: Monocots
- Clade: Commelinids
- Order: Poales
- Family: Cyperaceae
- Genus: Carex
- Species: C. leersii

Binomial name
- Carex leersii F.W.Schultz

Synonyms
- List: Carex canescens Leers; Carex chabertii F.W.Schultz; Carex contigua subsp. leersii (F.W.Schultz) Degen; Carex cuprina (Sándor ex Heuff.) Nendtv. ex A.Kern.; Carex divulsa subsp. chabertii (F.W.Schultz) Asch. & Graebn.; Carex divulsa var. chabertii (F.W.Schultz) Nyman; Carex divulsa var. intermedia Lange; Carex divulsa subsp. leersii (F.W.Schultz) W.Koch; Carex durieui (F.W.Schultz) F.W.Schultz; Carex echinata var. leersii (F.W.Schultz) Kük.; Carex leersiana Rauschert; Carex leersiana (Rouy) Prain; Carex leersii var. depauperata Hampe ex Vollm.; Carex muricata var. chabertii (F.W.Schultz) Maire & Weiller; Carex muricata subsp. leersii (F.W.Schultz) Asch. & Graebn.; Carex muricata var. leersii (F.W.Schultz) Kneuck.; Carex nemorosa var. cuprina Sándor ex Heuff.; Carex pairae var. leersii (F.W.Schultz) Kük.; Carex pairae subsp. leersii (F.W.Schultz) O.Schwarz; Carex virens var. durieui F.W.Schultz; Carex vulpina subsp. cuprina (Sándor ex Heuff.) O.Bolòs & Vigo; Vignea cuprina (Sándor ex Heuff.) Soják; Vignea divulsa subsp. leersiana Dostál

= Carex leersii =

Species of grass-like plant

Carex leersii, the grassland sedge or many-leaved sedge, is a widespread species of flowering plant in the family Cyperaceae. It is native to the Atlas Mountains in Africa, Europe, the Middle East, Central Asia, the Altai and the western Himalayas, and has been introduced to New Zealand. It is a member of the Carex muricata group, and prefers to grow in sunny, relatively dry locations.
