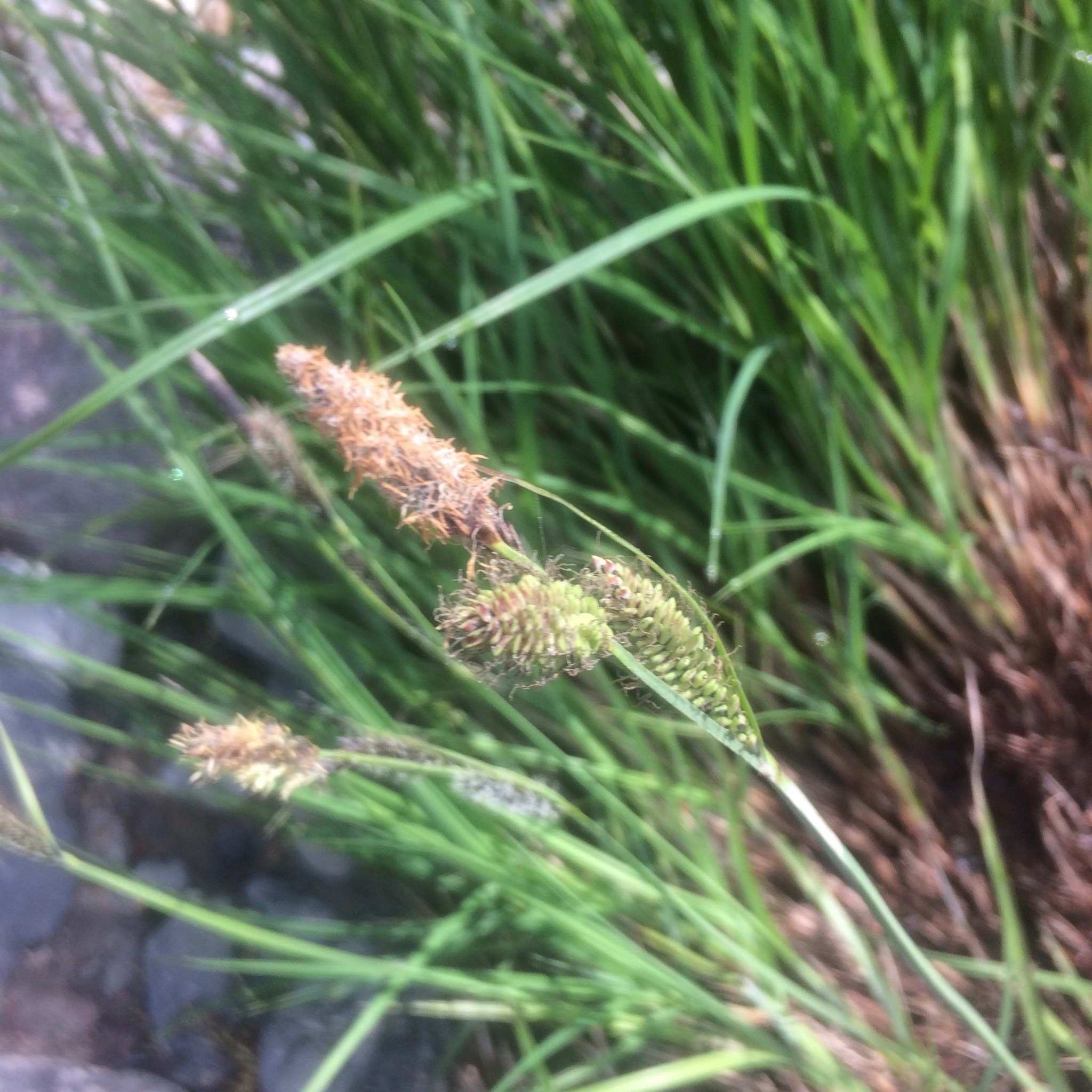

Scientific classification
- Kingdom: Plantae
- Clade: Tracheophytes
- Clade: Angiosperms
- Clade: Monocots
- Clade: Commelinids
- Order: Poales
- Family: Cyperaceae
- Genus: Carex
- Species: C. nudata

Binomial name
- Carex nudata W.Boott

Synonyms
- List: Carex acutina L.H.Bailey; Carex aperta var. angustifolia Boott; Carex bishallii C.B.Clarke; Carex hallii L.H.Bailey; Carex pulchella Holm; Carex suborbiculata Mack.; Carex tenacissima Suksd.

= Carex nudata =

Species of grass-like plant

Carex nudata is a species of true sedge known by several common names, including torrent sedge, California black-flowering sedge, Dudley's sedge, and naked sedge.

== Distribution ==
This sedge is found in California, Oregon, and Washington. It grows amidst rocks and developing a dense mounding bunchgrass type form, in coastal and in montane habitats.

== Description ==
Carex nudata is a bright green sedge which grows in mounds below the high-water mark in marshes and on river banks. It bears long scaly spikes of black, dark reddish or dusky brown flowers, which begin erect and then droop when they become heavy.
