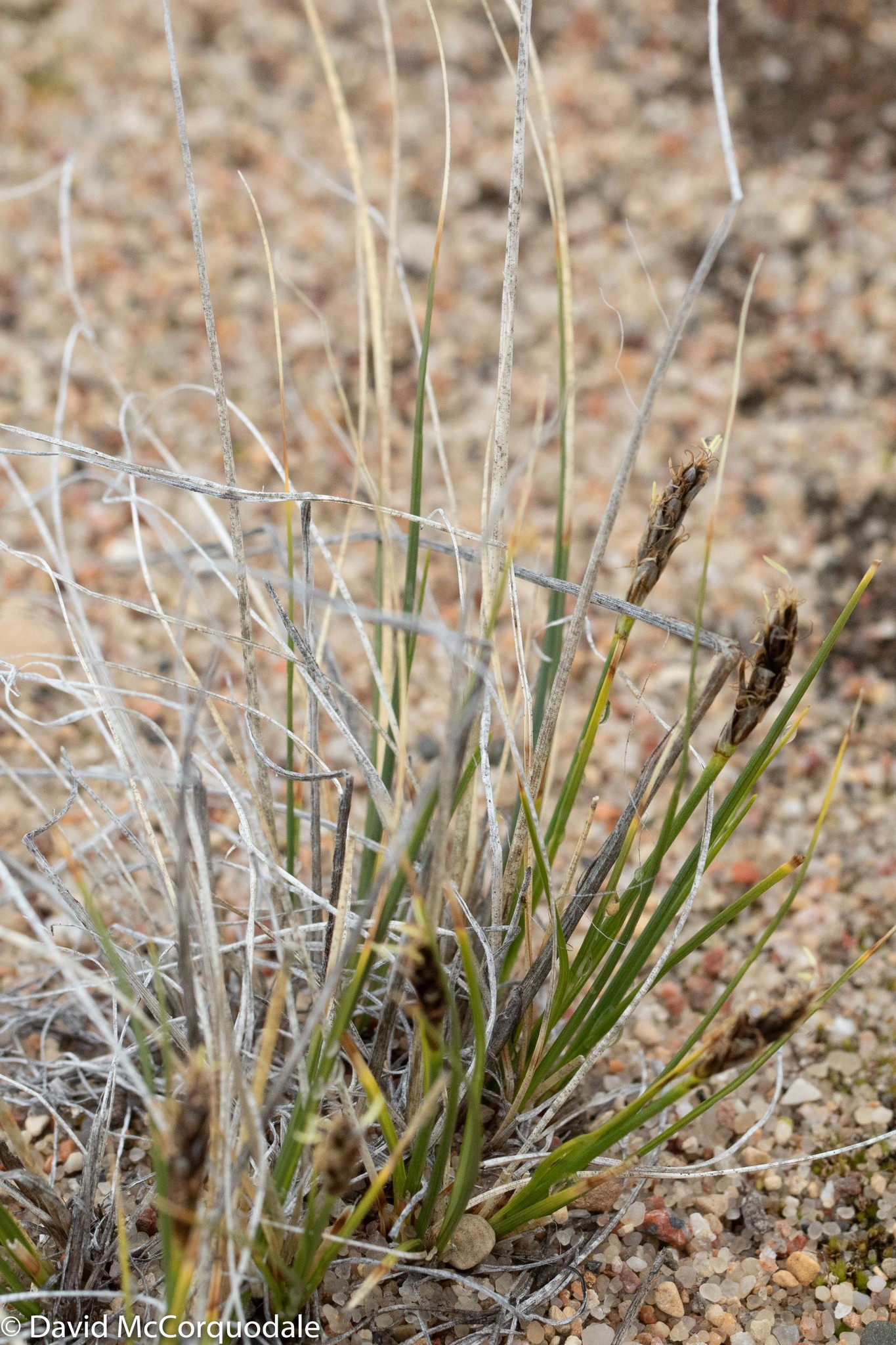

Scientific classification
- Kingdom: Plantae
- Clade: Tracheophytes
- Clade: Angiosperms
- Clade: Monocots
- Clade: Commelinids
- Order: Poales
- Family: Cyperaceae
- Genus: Carex
- Species: C. borealipolaris

Binomial name
- Carex borealipolaris S.R.Zhang

Synonyms
- List: Carex calcarea Melnikov; Carex smirnoviana Melnikov; Elyna sibirica Turcz.; Kobresia arctica A.E.Porsild; Kobresia bellardii var. macrocarpa (Clokey) H.D.Harr.; Kobresia hyperborea A.E.Porsild; Kobresia macrocarpa Clokey ex Mack.; Kobresia schoenoides var. lepagei (Duman) B.Boivin; Kobresia sibirica (Turcz.) Boeckeler; Kobresia smirnovii N.A.Ivanova

= Carex borealipolaris =

Species of grass-like plant

Carex borealipolaris, the Siberian bog sedge, is a species of plant known from arctic and alpine tundra habitats in Russia (Siberia, the Russian Far East), Canada (Yukon, the Northwest Territories, Nunavut, British Columbia), and the United States (Alaska, Colorado (several counties in the Rockies), Utah (Duchesne County), Montana (Carbon County), and Wyoming (Park County)). Some authorities have considered the North American collections as distinct species (C. macrocarpa, described from Colorado, and K. hyperborea from the Canadian Arctic), but they are more often tentatively regarded as conspecific with C. borealipolaris, but this is pending further investigation.

Carex borealipolaris is a perennial herb spreading by means of underground rhizomes. Culms are up to 40 cm tall. Leaves are narrow and thread-like, up to 15 cm long. Lower spikelets generally have both pistillate and staminate flowers, while uppermost spikelets are staminate only.
