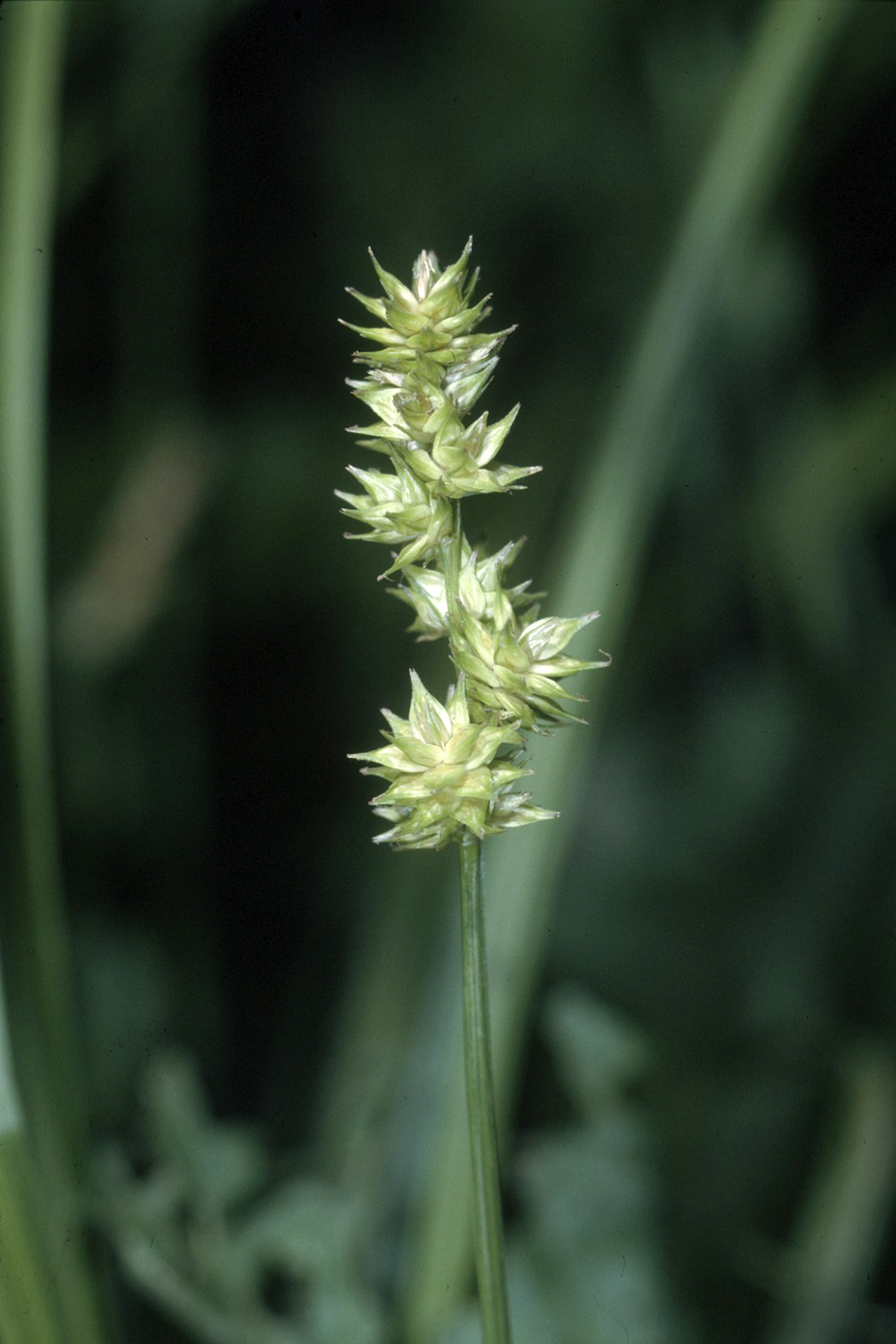

Scientific classification
- Kingdom: Plantae
- Clade: Tracheophytes
- Clade: Angiosperms
- Clade: Monocots
- Clade: Commelinids
- Order: Poales
- Family: Cyperaceae
- Genus: Carex
- Subgenus: Carex subg. Vignea
- Section: Carex sect. Phaestoglochin
- Species: C. sparganioides

Binomial name
- Carex sparganioides Muhl. ex Willd., 1805

= Carex sparganioides =

Species of grass-like plant

Carex sparganioides, known as bur-reed sedge or loose-headed bracted sedge, is a perennial plant belonging to the sedge family (Cyperaceae). Its native range includes most of the eastern and central United States and eastern Canada. In Maine, it is typically found in hardwood or mixed forests.

It typically grows 30–100 centimeters (12–39 in) high, and contains teardrop-shaped seed sacs within egg-shaped spikelets.

Carex sparganioides is considered endangered in Maine and New Hampshire. It is used for soil stabilization on shaded slopes.
