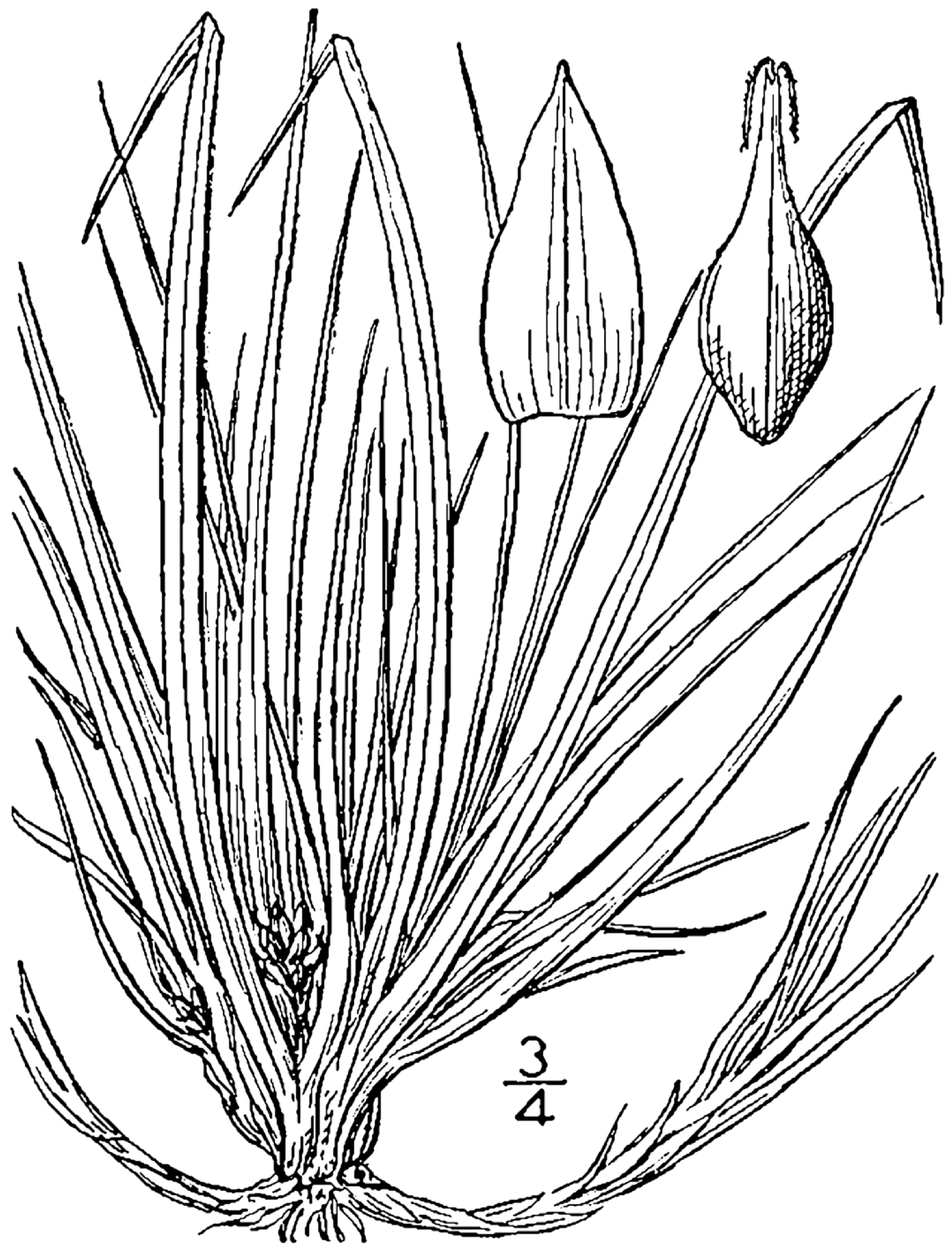

Scientific classification
- Kingdom: Plantae
- Clade: Tracheophytes
- Clade: Angiosperms
- Clade: Monocots
- Clade: Commelinids
- Order: Poales
- Family: Cyperaceae
- Genus: Carex
- Species: C. tonsa

Binomial name
- Carex tonsa E.P.Bicknell, 1908

= Carex tonsa =

Species of sedge

Carex tonsa, also known as shaved sedge, is a species of flowering plant in the sedge family, Cyperaceae. It is native to Canada and the Eastern United States.

== See also ==
- List of Carex species
