= Carex agglomerata =

Scientific classification
- Kingdom: Plantae
- Clade: Tracheophytes
- Clade: Angiosperms
- Clade: Monocots
- Clade: Commelinids
- Order: Poales
- Family: Cyperaceae
- Genus: Carex
- Species: C. agglomerata

Binomial name
- Carex agglomerata C.B.Clarke

Synonyms
- Carex agglomerata var. rhizomata Y.C.Yang

Species of grass-like plant

Carex agglomerata is a species of plant in the family Cyperaceae first described by Charles Baron Clarke.

== Subspecies ==
List of subspecies in Catalogue of Life:

- Carex agglomerata rhizomata
- Carex agglomerata agglomerata
