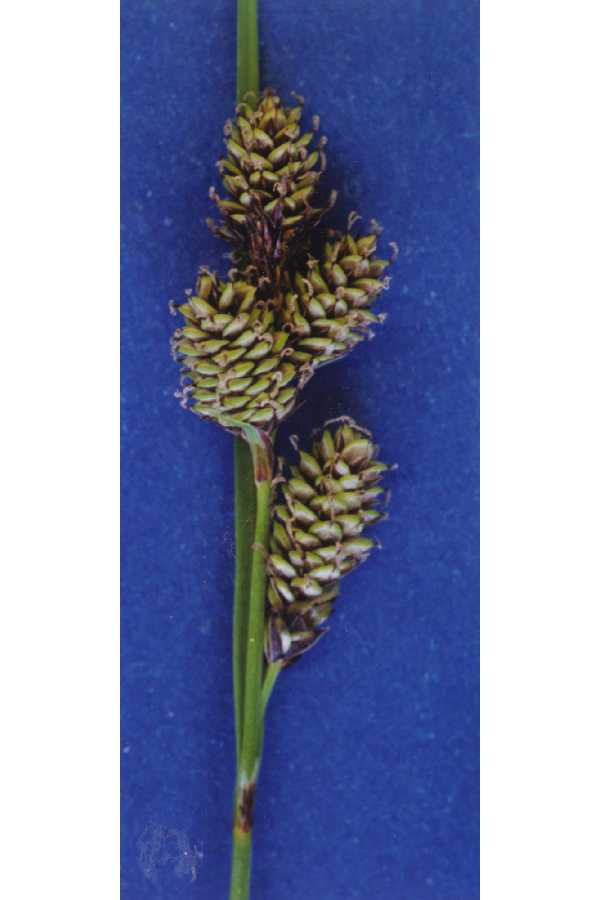

Scientific classification
- Kingdom: Plantae
- Clade: Tracheophytes
- Clade: Angiosperms
- Clade: Monocots
- Clade: Commelinids
- Order: Poales
- Family: Cyperaceae
- Genus: Carex
- Species: C. heteroneura

Binomial name
- Carex heteroneura W.Boott

= Carex heteroneura =

Species of grass-like plant

Carex heteroneura is a species of sedge known by the common name different-nerve sedge. It is native to western Canada and the western United States, where it grows in moist mountain habitat such as forests and meadows.

== Description ==
This sedge produces clumps of stems up to a meter-3 feet tall, often much shorter. The plant is variable in appearance, including in the appearance of its identifying characters, such as the scales on the flowers and the perigynia on the fruits. In general the spikes are oblong or cylindrical and dense with bicolored spikelets. The perigynium is greenish or purplish and has a short, rounded tip.
