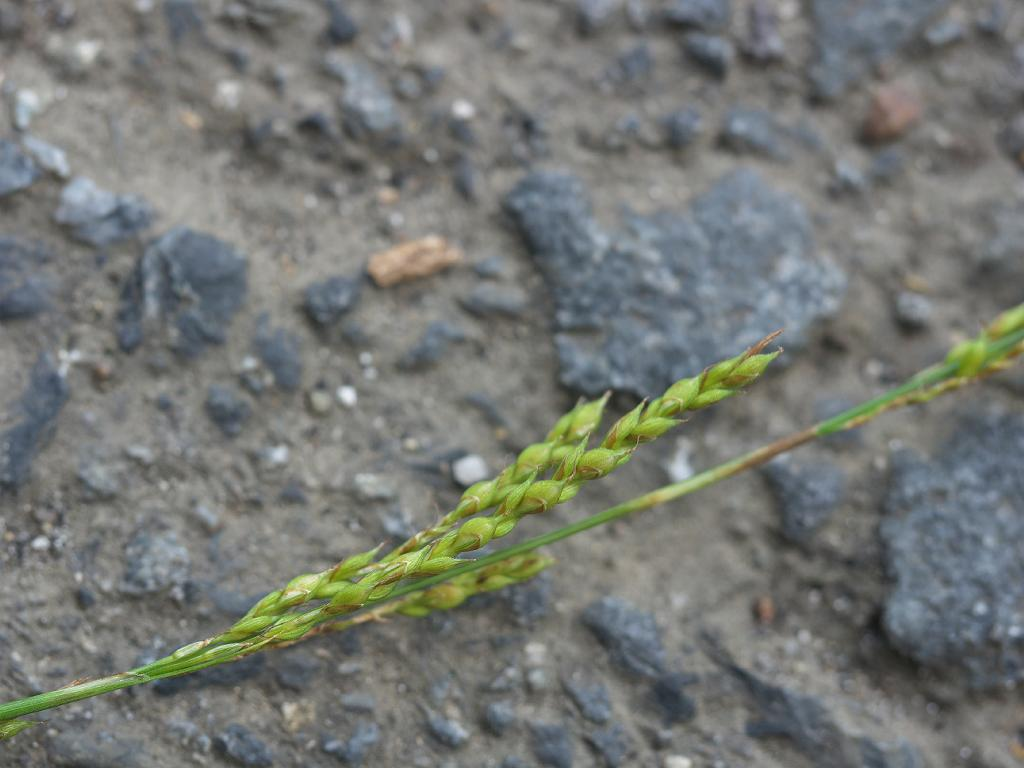

Scientific classification
- Kingdom: Plantae
- Clade: Tracheophytes
- Clade: Angiosperms
- Clade: Monocots
- Clade: Commelinids
- Order: Poales
- Family: Cyperaceae
- Genus: Carex
- Species: C. autumnalis

Binomial name
- Carex autumnalis Ohwi

= Carex autumnalis =

Species of grass-like plant

Carex autumnalis is a species of flowering plant in the sedge family, Cyperaceae. It was first formally named by Jisaburo Ohwi in 1930. Carex autumnalis is native to Japan and mainland eastern Asia, from southeastern China to North Korea. In China it grows in shady ravines.
