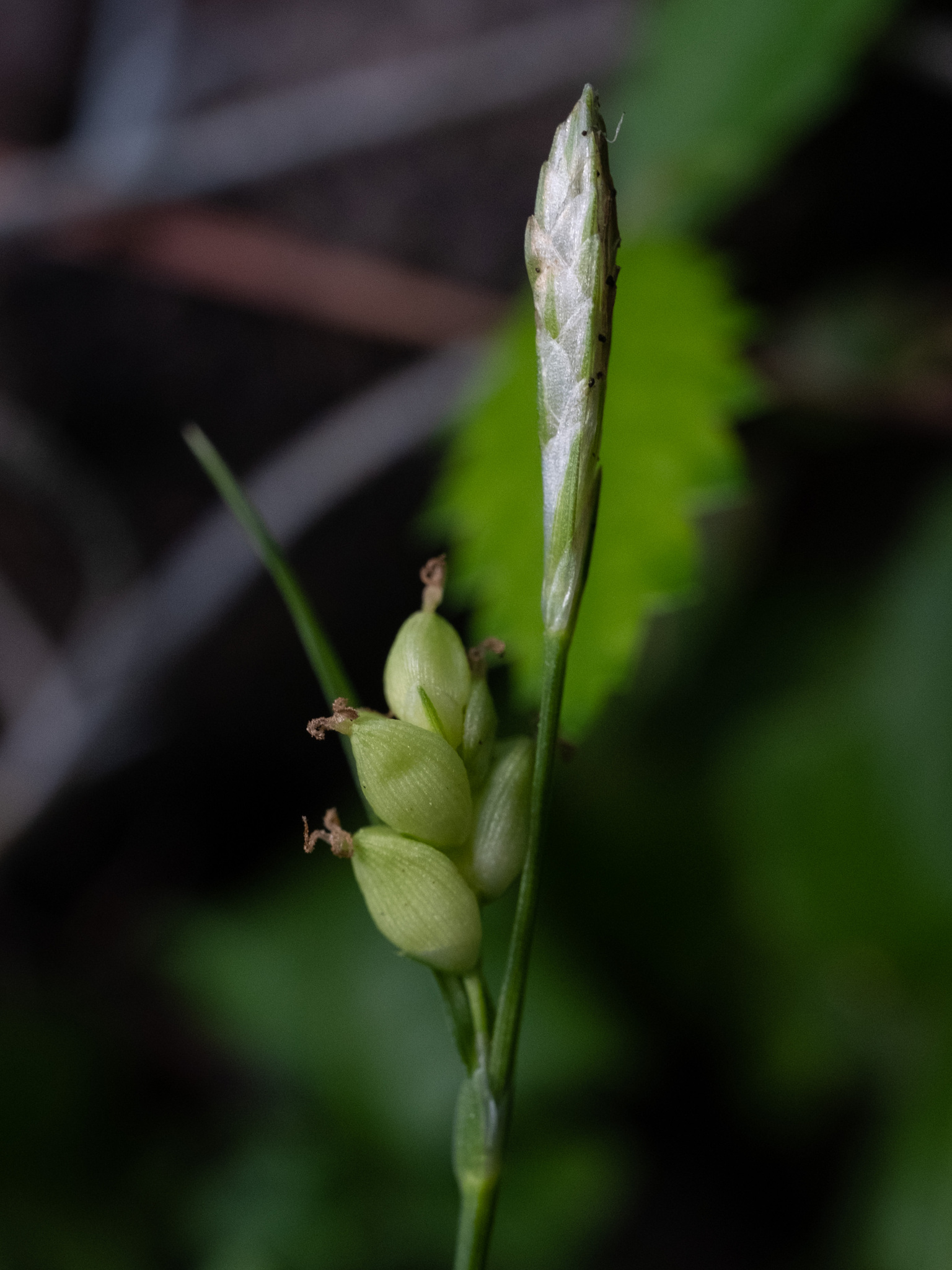

Conservation status
- Least Concern (IUCN 3.1)

Scientific classification
- Kingdom: Plantae
- Clade: Tracheophytes
- Clade: Angiosperms
- Clade: Monocots
- Clade: Commelinids
- Order: Poales
- Family: Cyperaceae
- Genus: Carex
- Species: C. digitalis

Binomial name
- Carex digitalis Willd.

= Carex digitalis =

Species of plant

Carex digitalis, common name slender woodland sedge,is a tussock-forming species of perennial sedge in the family Cyperaceae. It is native to south eastern parts of Canada as well as central and eastern parts of the United States.

== Description ==
The sedge has a densely turfy appearance with many shots from the same root forming a thick mat. The erect or ascending culms are 7 to 52 cm (2.8 to 20.5 in) in length and have a width of 0.5 to 1 mm (0.020 to 0.039 in). The leaves are surrounded by white or light brown basal sheaths with higher green coloured sheaths being green in colour. The leaf blades are 8 to 44 cm (3.1 to 17.3 in) in length and 0.8 to 5 mm (0.031 to 0.197 in) wide.

== Taxonomy ==
The species was first described by the botanist Carl Ludwig Willdenow in 1805 as a part of the work Species Plantarum.

== Distribution ==
The plant is found in temperate areas. In Canada it is found in Ontario in the east to parts of Quebec in the north and to Nova Scotia in the east. The range extends south through the United States to Texas and Oklahoma in the south-east and Florida in the south-west.

== See also ==
- List of Carex species
