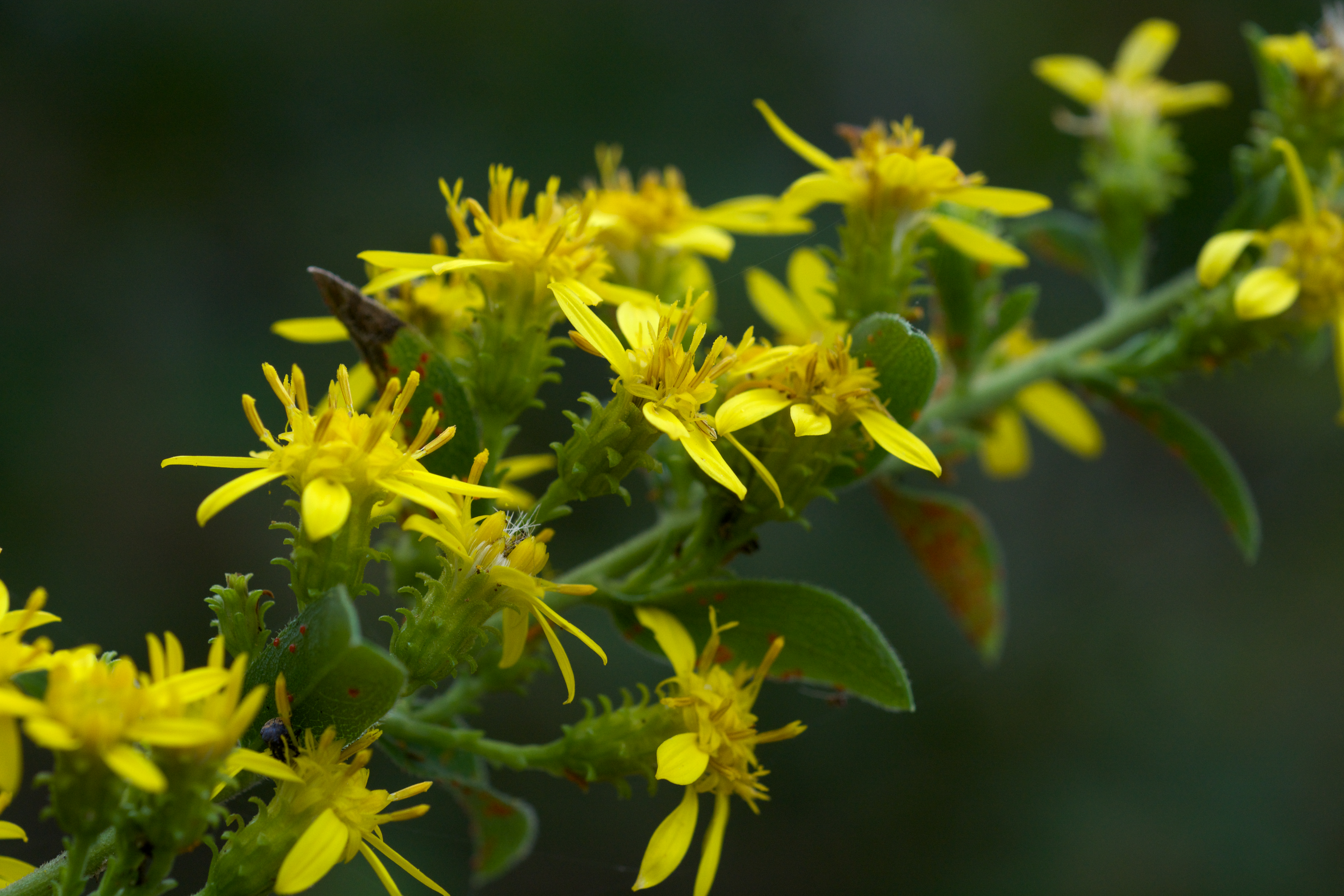

Scientific classification
- Kingdom: Plantae
- Clade: Tracheophytes
- Clade: Angiosperms
- Clade: Eudicots
- Clade: Asterids
- Order: Asterales
- Family: Asteraceae
- Genus: Solidago
- Species: S. petiolaris

Binomial name
- Solidago petiolaris Aiton 1789

Synonyms
- Aster lindheimeranus (Scheele) Kuntze; Aster petiolaris (Aiton) Kuntze; Solidago angusta Torr. & A.Gray; Solidago lindheimeriana Scheele; Solidago milleriana Mack. ex Small; Solidago squarrulosa (Torr. & A.Gray) Alph.Wood; Solidago wardii Britton

= Solidago petiolaris =

Species of flowering plant

Solidago petiolaris is a North American species of goldenrod commonly called the downy ragged goldenrod. It is native to the United States and Mexico, in every coastal state from Texas to North Carolina, inland as far as southern Illinois, southern Nebraska, northeastern New Mexico, and Coahuila. Its preferred habitat is sandy areas.

== Galls ==
This species is host to the following insect induced gall:

- Asphondylia pumila Plakidas, 2016 (spring and summer generation)

external link to gallformers
