= List of Canadian plants by family C =

Main page: List of Canadian plants by family

The following families of vascular plants are listed as occurring in Canada:

For mosses of Canada, see:

== Cabombaceae ==
- Brasenia schreberi — watershield

== Cactaceae ==
- Escobaria vivipara — foxtail pincushion cactus
- Opuntia fragilis — brittle prickly-pear
- Opuntia humifusa — eastern prickly-pear
- Opuntia polyacantha — panhandle prickly-pear

== Callitrichaceae ==
- Callitriche hermaphroditica — autumnal water-starwort
- Callitriche heterophylla — large water-starwort
- Callitriche marginata — winged water-starwort
- Callitriche palustris — vernal water-starwort
- Callitriche terrestris — terrestrial water-starwort

== Calypogeiaceae ==
- Calypogeia fissa
- Calypogeia integristipula
- Calypogeia muelleriana
- Calypogeia neesiana
- Calypogeia sphagnicola
- Calypogeia suecica
- Calypogeia trichomanis
- Metacalypogeia schusterana

== Campanulaceae ==
- Asyneuma prenanthoides — California harebell
- Campanula aparinoides — marsh bellflower
- Campanula aurita — Yukon bellflower
- Campanula lasiocarpa — common Alaska harebell
- Campanula parryi — Parry's northern harebell
- Campanula rotundifolia — American harebell
- Campanula scouleri — Scouler's bellflower
- Campanula uniflora — Arctic harebell
- Campanulastrum americanum — tall bellflower
- Downingia elegans — common downingia
- Downingia laeta — Great Basin downingia
- Githopsis specularioides — common blue-cup
- Heterocodon rariflorum — western pearl-flower
- Lobelia cardinalis — cardinal-flower
- Lobelia dortmanna — water lobelia
- Lobelia inflata — Indian-tobacco
- Lobelia kalmii — Kalm's lobelia
- Lobelia siphilitica — great blue lobelia
- Lobelia spicata — palespike lobelia
- Lobelia x speciosa
- Triodanis perfoliata — claspingleaf Venus'-looking-glass

== Cannabaceae ==
- Celtis occidentalis — common hackberry
- Celtis tenuifolia — dwarf hackberry
- Humulus lupulus — common hop

== Capparaceae ==
- Cleome serrulata — bee spiderflower
- Polanisia dodecandra — common clammyweed

== Caprifoliaceae ==
- Diervilla lonicera — northern bush-honeysuckle
- Linnaea borealis — twinflower
- Lonicera caerulea — western honeysuckle
- Lonicera canadensis — American fly-honeysuckle
- Lonicera ciliosa — orange honeysuckle
- Lonicera dioica — mountain honeysuckle
- Lonicera hirsuta — hairy honeysuckle
- Lonicera hispidula — California honeysuckle
- Lonicera involucrata — four-line honeysuckle
- Lonicera oblongifolia — swamp fly-honeysuckle
- Lonicera reticulata — grape honeysuckle
- Lonicera utahensis — Utah honeysuckle
- Lonicera villosa — mountain fly-honeysuckle
- Sambucus nigra — common elderberry
- Sambucus racemosa — red elderberry
- Symphoricarpos albus — snowberry
- Symphoricarpos hesperius — spreading snowberry
- Symphoricarpos occidentalis — northern snowberry
- Symphoricarpos oreophilus — mountain snowberry
- Triosteum angustifolium — yellowleaf tinker's-weed
- Triosteum aurantiacum — coffee tinker's-weed
- Triosteum perfoliatum — perfoliate tinker's-weed

== Caryophyllaceae ==
- Arenaria capillaris — fescue sandwort
- Arenaria congesta — capitate sandwort
- Arenaria humifusa — creeping sandwort
- Arenaria longipedunculata — low sandwort
- Cerastium alpinum — alpine chickweed
- Cerastium arvense — mouse-ear chickweed
- Cerastium beeringianum — Bering Sea chickweed
- Cerastium brachypodum — mouse-ear chickweed
- Cerastium cerastioides — starwort chickweed
- Cerastium fischerianum — Fischer's chickweed
- Cerastium maximum — great chickweed
- Cerastium nigrescens — black mouse-ear chickweed
- Cerastium nutans — nodding chickweed
- Cerastium regelii — Regel's chickweed
- Dianthus repens — carnation
- Honckenya peploides — seabeach sandwort
- Lychnis alpina — alpine campion
- Minuartia arctica — Arctic stitchwort
- Minuartia austromontana — Columbian stitchwort
- Minuartia biflora — mountain stitchwort
- Minuartia dawsonensis — rock stitchwort
- Minuartia elegans — Ross' stitchwort
- Minuartia groenlandica — mountain sandwort
- Minuartia litorea
- Minuartia macrocarpa — longpod stitchwort
- Minuartia marcescens — serpentine stitchwort
- Minuartia michauxii — Michaux's stitchwort
- Minuartia nuttallii — Nuttall's stitchwort
- Minuartia obtusiloba — alpine stitchwort
- Minuartia pusilla — dwarf stitchwort
- Minuartia rossii — Ross' stitchwort
- Minuartia rubella — boreal stitchwort
- Minuartia stricta — rock sandwort
- Minuartia tenella — slender stitchwort
- Minuartia yukonensis — Yukon stitchwort
- Moehringia lateriflora — grove sandwort
- Moehringia macrophylla — largeleaf sandwort
- Paronychia canadensis — forked nailwort
- Paronychia fastigiata — cluster-stemmed nailwort
- Paronychia sessiliflora — low nailwort
- Sagina caespitosa — tufted pearlwort
- Sagina decumbens — small-flowered pearlwort
- Sagina maxima — sticky-stem pearlwort
- Sagina nivalis — snow pearlwort
- Sagina nodosa — knotted pearlwort
- Sagina saginoides — Arctic pearlwort
- Silene acaulis — moss campion
- Silene antirrhina — sleepy catchfly
- Silene douglasii — Douglas' campion
- Silene drummondii — Drummond's campion
- Silene involucrata — Arctic catchfly
- Silene menziesii — Menzies' pink
- Silene parryi — Parry's campion
- Silene repens — creeping catchfly
- Silene scouleri — Scouler's catchfly
- Silene sorensenis — Sorensen's catchfly
- Silene spaldingii — Spalding's campion
- Silene taimyrensis — Taimyr catchfly
- Silene tayloriae — Peel River catchfly
- Silene uralensis — apetalous catchfly
- Silene x hampeana
- Spergularia canadensis — Canada sandspurry
- Spergularia macrotheca — beach sandspurry
- Spergularia salina — saltmarsh sandspurry
- Stellaria alaskana — Alaska starwort
- Stellaria alsine — trailing stitchwort
- Stellaria americana — American stitchwort
- Stellaria borealis — northern stitchwort
- Stellaria calycantha — northern stitchwort
- Stellaria ciliatosepala — tundra stitchwort
- Stellaria crassifolia — fleshy stitchwort
- Stellaria crassipes — tundra starwort
- Stellaria crispa — crimped stitchwort
- Stellaria dicranoides — matted starwort
- Stellaria humifusa — creeping sandwort
- Stellaria longifolia — longleaf stitchwort
- Stellaria longipes — long-stalked stitchwort
- Stellaria nitens — shiny stitchwort
- Stellaria obtusa — Rocky Mountain stitchwort
- Stellaria umbellata — umbellate stitchwort
- Wilhelmsia physodes — merkia

== Catoscopiaceae ==
- Catoscopium nigritum

== Celastraceae ==
- Celastrus scandens — climbing bittersweet
- Euonymus atropurpureus — wahoo
- Euonymus obovatus — running strawberry-bush
- Euonymus occidentalis — western strawberry-bush
- Paxistima myrsinites — Oregon boxleaf

== Cephaloziaceae ==
- Cephalozia affinis
- Cephalozia bicuspidata
- Cephalozia catenulata
- Cephalozia connivens
- Cephalozia lacinulata
- Cephalozia leucantha
- Cephalozia loitlesbergeri
- Cephalozia lunulifolia
- Cephalozia macounii
- Cephalozia macrostachya
- Cephalozia pleniceps
- Cladopodiella fluitans — cladopodiella moss
- Cladopodiella francisci
- Hygrobiella laxifolia
- Nowellia curvifolia
- Pleuroclada albescens
- Schofieldia monticola

== Cephaloziellaceae ==
- Cephaloziella arctica
- Cephaloziella brinkmani
- Cephaloziella divaricata
- Cephaloziella elachista
- Cephaloziella hampeana
- Cephaloziella massalongi
- Cephaloziella phyllacantha
- Cephaloziella rubella
- Cephaloziella spinigera
- Cephaloziella subdentata
- Cephaloziella turneri
- Cephaloziella uncinata

== Ceratophyllaceae ==
- Ceratophyllum demersum — common hornwort
- Ceratophyllum echinatum — prickly hornwort

== Chenopodiaceae ==
- Atriplex acadiensis — maritime saltbush
- Atriplex alaskensis — Alaska orache
- Atriplex argentea — silvery saltbush
- Atriplex canescens — four-wing saltbush
- Atriplex dioica — orache
- Atriplex falcata — sickle saltbush
- Atriplex franktonii — Frankton's saltbush
- Atriplex gardneri — Gardner's saltbush
- Atriplex glabriuscula — northeastern saltbush
- Atriplex gmelinii — Gmelin's saltbush
- Atriplex littoralis — tropical saltbush
- Atriplex nudicaulis — Baltic saltbush
- Atriplex nuttallii — Nuttall's saltbush
- Atriplex patula — halberd-leaf orache
- Atriplex powellii — Powell's saltbush
- Atriplex prostrata — creeping saltbush
- Atriplex truncata — wedge-leaved saltbush
- Atriplex x aptera
- Chenopodium album — Missouri goosefoot
- Chenopodium atrovirens — dark goosefoot
- Chenopodium berlandieri — pitseed goosefoot
- Chenopodium capitatum — strawberry goosefoot
- Chenopodium desiccatum — narrowleaf goosefoot
- Chenopodium foggii — Fogg's goosefoot
- Chenopodium fremontii — Fremont's goosefoot
- Chenopodium hians — Hian's goosefoot
- Chenopodium humile — marshland goosefoot
- Chenopodium incanum — mealy goosefoot
- Chenopodium leptophyllum — narrowleaf goosefoot
- Chenopodium pratericola — desert goosefoot
- Chenopodium rubrum — coastblite goosefoot
- Chenopodium salinum — Rocky Mountain goosefoot
- Chenopodium simplex — giantseed goosefoot
- Chenopodium standleyanum — Standley's goosefoot
- Chenopodium subglabrum — smooth goosefoot
- Chenopodium watsonii — Watson's goosefoot
- Corispermum americanum — American bugseed
- Corispermum hookeri — Hooker's bugseed
- Corispermum ochotense — Okhotian bugseed
- Corispermum pallasii — Pallas' bugseed
- Corispermum villosum — hairy bugseed
- Cycloloma atriplicifolium — winged pigweed
- Endolepis dioica — Suckley's saltbush
- Krascheninnikovia lanata — winter-fat
- Monolepis nuttalliana — Nuttall's poverty-weed
- Salicornia borealis — boreal saltwort
- Salicornia maritima — jointed glasswort
- Salicornia rubra — western glasswort
- Salicornia virginica — Virginia glasswort
- Sarcobatus vermiculatus — black greasewood
- Sarcocornia pacifica — Pacific glasswort
- Suaeda calceoliformis — American sea-blite
- Suaeda maritima — herbaceous seepweed
- Suaeda moquinii — shrubby seepweed
- Suaeda rolandii — Rolands' sea-blite
- Suckleya suckleyana — poison suckleya

== Cistaceae ==
- Helianthemum bicknellii — plains frostweed
- Helianthemum canadense — Canada frostweed
- Hudsonia ericoides — golden-heather
- Hudsonia tomentosa — sand-heather
- Lechea intermedia — narrowleaf pinweed
- Lechea maritima — beach pinweed
- Lechea mucronata — hairy pinweed
- Lechea pulchella — Leggett's pinweed
- Lechea stricta — upright pinweed
- Lechea tenuifolia — slender pinweed

== Clethraceae ==
- Clethra alnifolia — coast pepperbush

== Cleveaceae ==
- Athalamia hyalina
- Peltolepis quadrata
- Sauteria alpina

== Climaciaceae ==
- Climacium americanum — tree moss
- Climacium dendroides — tree climacium moss

== Clusiaceae ==
- Hypericum anagalloides — tinker's-penny
- Hypericum ascyron — great St. John's-wort
- Hypericum boreale — northern St. John's-wort
- Hypericum canadense — Canadian St. John's-wort
- Hypericum dissimulatum — disguised St. John's-wort
- Hypericum ellipticum — pale St. John's-wort
- Hypericum gentianoides — orange-grass St. John's-wort
- Hypericum kalmianum — Kalm's St. John's-wort
- Hypericum majus — larger Canadian St. John's-wort
- Hypericum mutilum — slender St. John's-wort
- Hypericum prolificum — shrubby St. John's-wort
- Hypericum punctatum — common St. John's-wort
- Hypericum scouleri — western St. John's-wort
- Hypericum sphaerocarpum — roundfruit St. John's-wort
- Triadenum fraseri — marsh St. John's-wort
- Triadenum virginicum — Virginia marsh St. John's-wort

== Commelinaceae ==
- Tradescantia occidentalis — prairie spiderwort
- Tradescantia ohiensis — Ohio spiderwort

== Conocephalaceae ==
- Conocephalum conicum — snakeskin liverwort

== Convolvulaceae ==
- Calystegia macounii — Macoun's bindweed
- Calystegia sepium — hedge false bindweed
- Calystegia silvatica — shortstalk false bindweed
- Calystegia soldanella — seashore bindweed
- Calystegia spithamaea — low bindweed
- Ipomoea pandurata — bigroot morning-glory

== Cornaceae ==
- Cornus alternifolia — alternate-leaf dogwood
- Cornus amomum — silky dogwood
- Cornus canadensis — Canada bunchberry
- Cornus drummondii — northern roughleaf dogwood
- Cornus florida — flowering dogwood
- Cornus nuttallii — Pacific dogwood
- Cornus racemosa — grey dogwood
- Cornus rugosa — roundleaf dogwood
- Cornus sericea — silky dogwood
- Cornus suecica — Swedish dwarf dogwood
- Cornus × unalaschkensis — western dwarf dogwood
- Cornus × acadiensis
- Cornus × slavinii

== Crassulaceae ==
- Crassula aquatica — water pygmyweed
- Crassula connata — sand pygmyweed
- Penthorum sedoides — ditch-stonecrop
- Rhodiola integrifolia — entire-leaf stonecrop
- Rhodiola rosea — roseroot stonecrop
- Sedum divergens — spreading stonecrop
- Sedum lanceolatum — lanceleaf stonecrop
- Sedum oreganum — Oregon stonecrop
- Sedum spathulifolium — Pacific stonecrop
- Sedum stenopetalum — narrowpetal stonecrop
- Sedum villosum — purple stonecrop

== Cucurbitaceae ==
- Echinocystis lobata — wild mock-cucumber
- Marah oreganus — coast manroot
- Sicyos angulatus — one-seed bur-cucumber

== Cupressaceae ==
- Chamaecyparis nootkatensis — Alaska cedar
- Juniperus communis — ground juniper
- Juniperus horizontalis — creeping juniper
- Juniperus scopulorum — Rocky Mountain juniper
- Juniperus virginiana — eastern red-cedar
- Juniperus x fassettii
- Thuja occidentalis — northern white-cedar
- Thuja plicata — western red-cedar

== Cuscutaceae ==
- Cuscuta cephalanthi — buttonbush dodder
- Cuscuta coryli — hazel dodder
- Cuscuta gronovii — Gronovius dodder
- Cuscuta megalocarpa — bigfruit dodder
- Cuscuta pentagona — field dodder
- Cuscuta polygonorum — smartweed dodder
- Cuscuta salina — saltmarsh dodder

== Cyperaceae ==
- Blysmus rufus — red bulrush
- Bulbostylis capillaris — densetuft hairsedge
- Carex adelostoma — circumpolar sedge
- Carex adusta — crowded sedge
- Carex aggregata — glomerate sedge
- Carex alata — broadwing sedge
- Carex albicans — bellow-beaked sedge
- Carex albonigra — black-and-white scale sedge
- Carex albursina — white bear sedge
- Carex alopecoidea — foxtail sedge
- Carex amphibola — eastern narrowleaf sedge
- Carex amplifolia — bigleaf sedge
- Carex anguillata — snail sedge
- Carex annectens — yellowfruit sedge
- Carex anthoxanthea — yellow-flowered sedge
- Carex aperta — Columbian sedge
- Carex appalachica — Appalachian sedge
- Carex aquatilis — water sedge
- Carex arcta — northern clustered sedge
- Carex arctata — black sedge
- Carex arctiformis — polar sedge
- Carex argyrantha — hay sedge
- Carex assiniboinensis — Assiniboine sedge
- Carex atherodes — awned sedge
- Carex athrostachya — jointed-spike sedge
- Carex atlantica — prickly bog sedge
- Carex atratiformis — black sedge
- Carex atrofusca — scorched alpine sedge
- Carex atrosquama — blackened sedge
- Carex aurea — golden-fruit sedge
- Carex backii — Rocky Mountain sedge
- Carex baileyi — Bailey's sedge
- Carex bebbii — Bebb's sedge
- Carex bicknellii — Bicknell's sedge
- Carex bicolor — two-colour sedge
- Carex bigelowii — Bigelow's sedge
- Carex bipartita — Arctic hare's-foot sedge
- Carex blanda — woodland sedge
- Carex bolanderi — Bolander's sedge
- Carex bonanzensis — Yukon sedge
- Carex brevicaulis — shortstem sedge
- Carex brevior — fescue sedge
- Carex bromoides — bromelike sedge
- Carex brunnescens — brownish sedge
- Carex bullata — button sedge
- Carex buxbaumii — Buxbaum's sedge
- Carex canescens — hoary sedge
- Carex capillaris — hairlike sedge
- Carex capitata — capitate sedge
- Carex careyana — Carey's sedge
- Carex castanea — chestnut-coloured sedge
- Carex cephaloidea — thinleaf sedge
- Carex cephalophora — ovalleaf sedge
- Carex chordorrhiza — creeping sedge
- Carex circinata — coiled sedge
- Carex communis — fibrous-root sedge
- Carex comosa — bristly sedge
- Carex concinna — beautiful sedge
- Carex concinnoides — northwestern sedge
- Carex conoidea — field sedge
- Carex cordillerana — Cordillera sedge
- Carex crawei — Crawe's sedge
- Carex crawfordii — Crawford's sedge
- Carex crinita — fringed sedge
- Carex cristatella — crested sedge
- Carex crus-corvi — ravenfoot sedge
- Carex cryptolepis — northeastern sedge
- Carex cumulata — clustered sedge
- Carex cusickii — Cusick's sedge
- Carex davisii — Davis' sedge
- Carex debilis — white-edge sedge
- Carex deflexa — short-stemmed sedge
- Carex deweyana — shortscale sedge
- Carex diandra — lesser panicled sedge
- Carex digitalis — slender wood sedge
- Carex disperma — softleaf sedge
- Carex douglasii — Douglas' sedge
- Carex duriuscula — needleleaf sedge
- Carex dutillyi — Dutilly's sedge
- Carex eburnea — ebony sedge
- Carex echinata — little prickly sedge
- Carex eleusinoides — goosegrass sedge
- Carex emoryi — Emory's sedge
- Carex engelmannii — Engelmann's sedge
- Carex exilis — coast sedge
- Carex exsiccata — beaked sedge
- Carex festucacea — fescue sedge
- Carex feta — green-sheath sedge
- Carex filifolia — thread-leaved sedge
- Carex flaccosperma — thinfruit sedge
- Carex flava — yellow sedge
- Carex folliculata — long sedge
- Carex formosa — handsome sedge
- Carex frankii — Frank's sedge
- Carex garberi — elk sedge
- Carex geyeri — Geyer's sedge
- Carex glacialis — alpine sedge
- Carex glareosa — weak-cluster sedge
- Carex gmelinii — Gmelin's sedge
- Carex gracilescens — slender sedge
- Carex gracillima — graceful sedge
- Carex granularis — meadow sedge
- Carex gravida — heavy-fruited sedge
- Carex grayi — Asa Gray's sedge
- Carex grisea — inflated narrowleaf sedge
- Carex gynandra — nodding sedge
- Carex gynocrates — northern bog sedge
- Carex hallii — Hall's sedge
- Carex hassei — Hasse's sedge
- Carex haydeniana — Hayden's sedge
- Carex haydenii — cloud sedge
- Carex heleonastes — Hudson Bay sedge
- Carex hendersonii — Henderson's sedge
- Carex heteroneura — different-nerve sedge
- Carex hirsutella — hirsute sedge
- Carex hirtifolia — pubescent sedge
- Carex hitchcockiana — Hitchcock's sedge
- Carex holostoma — Arctic marsh sedge
- Carex hoodii — Hood's sedge
- Carex hookeriana — Hooker's sedge
- Carex hormathodes — marsh straw sedge
- Carex hostiana — host sedge
- Carex houghtoniana — Houghton's sedge
- Carex houghtoniana — shoreline sedge
- Carex hystericina — porcupine sedge
- Carex illota — smallhead sedge
- Carex incurviformis — seaside sedge
- Carex infirminervia
- Carex inops — longstolon sedge
- Carex interior — inland sedge
- Carex interrupta — green-fruited sedge
- Carex intumescens — greater bladder sedge
- Carex jamesii — Nebraska sedge
- Carex juniperorum — cedar sedge
- Carex krausei — Krause's sedge
- Carex lacustris — lakebank sedge
- Carex laeviconica — smooth-cone sedge
- Carex laeviculmis — smoothstem sedge
- Carex laevivaginata — smooth-sheath sedge
- Carex lapponica — Lapland sedge
- Carex lasiocarpa — slender sedge
- Carex laxa — weak sedge
- Carex laxiculmis — spreading sedge
- Carex laxiflora — looseflower sedge
- Carex leavenworthii — Leavenworth's sedge
- Carex lenticularis — shore sedge
- Carex leptalea — bristly-stalk sedge
- Carex leptonervia — finely-nerve sedge
- Carex leptopoda — short-scaled sedge
- Carex limosa — mud sedge
- Carex livida — livid sedge
- Carex loliacea — rye-grass sedge
- Carex longii — greenish-white sedge
- Carex lucorum — blue ridge sedge
- Carex lugens — spruce-muskeg sedge
- Carex lupuliformis — false hop sedge
- Carex lupulina — hop sedge
- Carex lurida — shallow sedge
- Carex luzulina — woodrush sedge
- Carex lyngbyei — Lyngbye's sedge
- Carex mackenziei — MacKenzie's sedge
- Carex macloviana — Falkland Island sedge
- Carex macrocephala — bighead sedge
- Carex macrochaeta — Alaska largeawn sedge
- Carex magellanica — boreal bog sedge
- Carex marina — sea sedge
- Carex maritima — seaside sedge
- Carex meadii — Mead's sedge
- Carex membranacea — fragile-seed sedge
- Carex merritt-fernaldii — Merritt Fernald's sedge
- Carex mertensii — Merten's sedge
- Carex mesochorea — midland sedge
- Carex michauxiana — Michaux's sedge
- Carex microchaeta — alpine tundra sedge
- Carex microglochin — false uncinia sedge
- Carex microptera — smallwing sedge
- Carex misandra — shortleaf sedge
- Carex misandroides — man-hater sedge
- Carex molesta — troublesome sedge
- Carex muehlenbergii — Mühlenberg's sedge
- Carex muskingumensis — Muskingum sedge
- Carex nardina — nard sedge
- Carex nebrascensis — Nebraska sedge
- Carex nigra — black sedge
- Carex nigricans — black alpine sedge
- Carex nigromarginata — blackedge sedge
- Carex normalis — greater straw sedge
- Carex norvegica — Scandinavian sedge
- Carex novae-angliae — New England sedge
- Carex obnupta — slough sedge
- Carex obtusata — blunt sedge
- Carex oligocarpa — eastern few-fruit sedge
- Carex oligosperma — few-seed sedge
- Carex ormostachya — necklace spike sedge
- Carex ovalis Willd. ex Kunth — nom. illeg. synonym for correct name, C. scoparia
- Carex pachystachya — thickhead sedge
- Carex paleacea — chaffy sedge
- Carex pallescens — pale sedge
- Carex pansa — sand-dune sedge
- Carex parryana — Parry's sedge
- Carex pauciflora — few-flower sedge
- Carex paysonis — Payson's sedge
- Carex peckii — white-tinged sedge
- Carex pedunculata — longstalk sedge
- Carex pellita — woolly sedge
- Carex pensylvanica — Pennsylvania sedge
- Carex petasata — liddon sedge
- Carex petricosa — rock sedge
- Carex phaeocephala — mountain hare sedge
- Carex piperi — Piper's sedge
- Carex plantaginea — plantain-leaf sedge
- Carex platylepis — broadscale sedge
- Carex platyphylla — broadleaf sedge
- Carex pluriflora — several-flowered sedge
- Carex podocarpa — shortstalk sedge
- Carex praeceptorum — teacher's sedge
- Carex praegracilis — clustered field sedge
- Carex prairea — prairie sedge
- Carex prasina — drooping sedge
- Carex praticola — northern meadow sedge
- Carex preslii — Presl's sedge
- Carex projecta — necklace sedge
- Carex proposita — Smoky Mountain sedge
- Carex pseudocyperus — cyperus-like sedge
- Carex pyrenaica — Pyrenean sedge
- Carex radiata — stellate sedge
- Carex ramenskii — Ramenski's sedge
- Carex rariflora — loose-flowered sedge
- Carex raymondii — black sedge
- Carex raynoldsii — Raynolds' sedge
- Carex recta — saltmarsh sedge
- Carex retroflexa — reflexed sedge
- Carex retrorsa — retrorse sedge
- Carex richardsonii — Richardson's sedge
- Carex rosea — rosy sedge
- Carex rossii — short sedge
- Carex rostrata — beaked sedge
- Carex rotundata — roundfruit sedge
- Carex rufina — snowbed sedge
- Carex rupestris — rock sedge
- Carex sabulosa — sand sedge
- Carex salina — saltmarsh sedge
- Carex sartwellii — Sartwell's sedge
- Carex saxatilis — russett sedge
- Carex saximontana — Rocky Mountain sedge
- Carex scabrata — rough sedge
- Carex schweinitzii — Schweinitz' sedge
- Carex scirpoidea — bulrush sedge
- Carex scoparia — broom sedge
- Carex scopulorum — Holm's Rocky Mountain sedge
- Carex seorsa — weak stellate sedge
- Carex shortiana — Short's sedge
- Carex siccata — dryspike sedge
- Carex silicea — seabeach sedge
- Carex simulata — copycat sedge
- Carex sparganioides — bur-reed sedge
- Carex spectabilis — northwestern showy sedge
- Carex sprengelii — longbeak sedge
- Carex squarrosa — squarrose sedge
- Carex sterilis — dioecious sedge
- Carex stipata — awl-fruit sedge
- Carex striatula — lined sedge
- Carex stricta — tussock sedge
- Carex stylosa — long-styled sedge
- Carex suberecta — prairie straw sedge
- Carex subfusca — rusty sedge
- Carex subspathacea — Hoppner's sedge
- Carex supina — weak Arctic sedge
- Carex swanii — Swan's sedge
- Carex sychnocephala — many-headed sedge
- Carex tahoensis — Lake Tahoe sedge
- Carex tenera — slender sedge
- Carex tenuiflora — sparseflower sedge
- Carex terrae-novae — Newfoundland sedge
- Carex tetanica — rigid sedge
- Carex tincta — tinged sedge
- Carex tonsa — shaved sedge
- Carex torreyi — Torrey's sedge
- Carex torta — twisted sedge
- Carex tribuloides — blunt broom sedge
- Carex trichocarpa — hairyfruit sedge
- Carex trisperma — three-seed sedge
- Carex tuckermanii — Tuckerman's sedge
- Carex tumulicola — foothill sedge
- Carex typhina — cattail sedge
- Carex umbellata — hidden sedge
- Carex unilateralis — one-sided sedge
- Carex ursina — bear sedge
- Carex utriculata — beaked sedge
- Carex vacillans
- Carex vaginata — sheathed sedge
- Carex vallicola — valley sedge
- Carex vesicaria — inflated sedge
- Carex virescens — ribbed sedge
- Carex viridula — little green sedge
- Carex vulpinoidea — fox sedge
- Carex wiegandii — Wiegand's sedge
- Carex willdenowii — Willdenow's sedge
- Carex williamsii — Williams' sedge
- Carex woodii — pretty sedge
- Carex x abitibiana — Abitibi sedge
- Carex x anticostensis — Anticosti sedge
- Carex x calderi — Calder's sedge
- Carex x connectens
- Carex x crinitoides
- Carex x exsalina
- Carex x firmior
- Carex x flavicans
- Carex x grahamii — Graham's sedge
- Carex x hartii — Hart's sedge
- Carex x helvola
- Carex x josephi-schmittii — Joseph Schmitt's sedge
- Carex x knieskernii — Knieskern's sedge
- Carex x langeana — Lange's sedge
- Carex x leutzii — Leutz' sedge
- Carex x limula
- Carex x mainensis — Maine sedge
- Carex x mendica
- Carex x neobigelowii
- Carex x neofilipendula
- Carex x neomiliaris
- Carex x neopaleacea
- Carex x neorigida
- Carex x nubens
- Carex x paleacoides
- Carex x pannewitziana — Pannewitz' sedge
- Carex x patuensis
- Carex x persalina
- Carex x physocarpioides
- Carex x pieperiana — Pieper's sedge
- Carex x pseudohelvola
- Carex x quebecensis — Québec sedge
- Carex x quirponensis
- Carex x reducta
- Carex x rollandii — Rolland's sedge
- Carex x saxenii — Saxen's sedge
- Carex x spiculosa
- Carex x stenolepis
- Carex x subimpressa
- Carex x sublimosa
- Carex x subnigra
- Carex x subpaleacea
- Carex x subreducta
- Carex x subsalina
- Carex x subviridula
- Carex x sullivantii — Sullivant's sedge
- Carex x supergoodenoughii — Goodenough's sedge
- Carex x trichina
- Carex x ungavensis — Ungava sedge
- Carex xerantica — white-scaled sedge
- Cladium mariscoides — twigrush
- Cyperus bipartitus — shining flatsedge
- Cyperus dentatus — toothed sedge
- Cyperus diandrus — umbrella flatsedge
- Cyperus echinatus — globe flatsedge
- Cyperus eragrostis — tall flatsedge
- Cyperus erythrorhizos — redroot flatsedge
- Cyperus esculentus — Chufa flatsedge
- Cyperus flavescens — yellow flatsedge
- Cyperus houghtonii — Houghton's umbrella-sedge
- Cyperus lupulinus — Great Plains flatsedge
- Cyperus odoratus — rusty flatsedge
- Cyperus schweinitzii — Schweinitz' flatsedge
- Cyperus squarrosus — awned cyperus
- Cyperus strigosus — straw-coloured flatsedge
- Dulichium arundinaceum — three-way sedge
- Eleocharis acicularis — least spikerush
- Eleocharis aestuum
- Eleocharis atropurpurea — purple spikerush
- Eleocharis compressa — flat-stemmed spikerush
- Eleocharis diandra — Wright's spikerush
- Eleocharis elliptica — slender spikerush
- Eleocharis engelmannii — Engelmann's spikerush
- Eleocharis equisetoides — horsetail spikerush
- Eleocharis erythropoda — bald spikerush
- Eleocharis fallax — creeping spikerush
- Eleocharis geniculata — capitate spikerush
- Eleocharis halophila — saltmarsh spikerush
- Eleocharis intermedia — matted spikerush
- Eleocharis kamtschatica — Kamtchatka spikerush
- Eleocharis macrostachya — creeping spikerush
- Eleocharis mamillata — softstem spikerush
- Eleocharis nitida — slender spikerush
- Eleocharis obtusa — blunt spikerush
- Eleocharis olivacea — capitate spikerush
- Eleocharis ovata — ovate spikerush
- Eleocharis palustris — creeping spikerush
- Eleocharis parvula — small spikerush
- Eleocharis quadrangulata — squarestem spikerush
- Eleocharis quinqueflora — few-flower spikerush
- Eleocharis robbinsii — Robbins' spikerush
- Eleocharis rostellata — beaked spikerush
- Eleocharis smallii — Small's creeping spikerush
- Eleocharis tenuis — slender spikerush
- Eleocharis tuberculosa — long-tuberculed spikerush
- Eleocharis uniglumis — creeping spikerush
- Eriophorum altaicum — white-bristle cottongrass
- Eriophorum angustifolium — narrowleaf cottongrass
- Eriophorum brachyantherum — shortanther cottongrass
- Eriophorum callitrix — sheathed cottongrass
- Eriophorum chamissonis — russett cottongrass
- Eriophorum gracile — slender cottongrass
- Eriophorum russeolum — russet cottongrass
- Eriophorum scheuchzeri — Scheuchzer's cottongrass
- Eriophorum tenellum — rough cottongrass
- Eriophorum vaginatum — tussock cottongrass
- Eriophorum virginicum — tawny cottongrass
- Eriophorum viridicarinatum — green-keeled cottongrass
- Eriophorum x gauthieri — Gauthier's cottongrass
- Eriophorum x medium
- Eriophorum x porsildii — Porsild's cottongrass
- Eriophorum x pylaieanum
- Eriophorum x rousseauanum — Rousseau's cottongrass
- Fimbristylis autumnalis — slender fimbry
- Fimbristylis puberula — hairy fimbristylis
- Fuirena pumila — dwarf umbrella-sedge
- Isolepis cernua — low bulrush
- Kobresia myosuroides — Pacific kobresia
- Kobresia sibirica — Siberian kobresia
- Kobresia simpliciuscula — simple kobresia
- Lipocarpha micrantha — dwarf bulrush
- Rhynchospora alba — white beakrush
- Rhynchospora capillacea — horned beakrush
- Rhynchospora capitellata — brownish beakrush
- Rhynchospora fusca — brown beakrush
- Schoenoplectus acutus — hardstem bulrush
- Schoenoplectus americanus — three-square bulrush
- Schoenoplectus fluviatilis — river bulrush
- Schoenoplectus heterochaetus — slender bulrush
- Schoenoplectus maritimus — saltmarsh bulrush
- Schoenoplectus novae-angliae — New England bulrush
- Schoenoplectus pungens — three-square bulrush
- Schoenoplectus purshianus — weakstalk bulrush
- Schoenoplectus robustus — saltmarsh bulrush
- Schoenoplectus saximontanus — Rocky Mountain bulrush
- Schoenoplectus smithii — Smith's bulrush
- Schoenoplectus subterminalis — water bulrush
- Schoenoplectus tabernaemontani — softstem bulrush
- Schoenoplectus torreyi — Torrey's bulrush
- Schoenoplectus x oblongus
- Scirpus atrocinctus — black-girdle bulrush
- Scirpus atrovirens — woolgrass bulrush
- Scirpus cyperinus — cottongrass bulrush
- Scirpus expansus — woodland beakrush
- Scirpus georgianus — Georgia bulrush
- Scirpus hattorianus
- Scirpus longii — Long's bulrush
- Scirpus microcarpus — smallfruit bulrush
- Scirpus nevadensis — Nevada bulrush
- Scirpus pallidus — pale bulrush
- Scirpus pedicellatus — stalked bulrush
- Scirpus pendulus — pendulous bulrush
- Scirpus x peckii — Peck's bulrush
- Scleria pauciflora — few-flower nutrush
- Scleria triglomerata — whip nutrush
- Scleria verticillata — low nutrush
- Trichophorum alpinum — alpine cottongrass
- Trichophorum caespitosum — tufted clubrush
- Trichophorum clintonii — Clinton's bulrush
- Trichophorum planifolium — bashful bulrush
- Trichophorum pumilum — Rolland's leafless-bulrush
