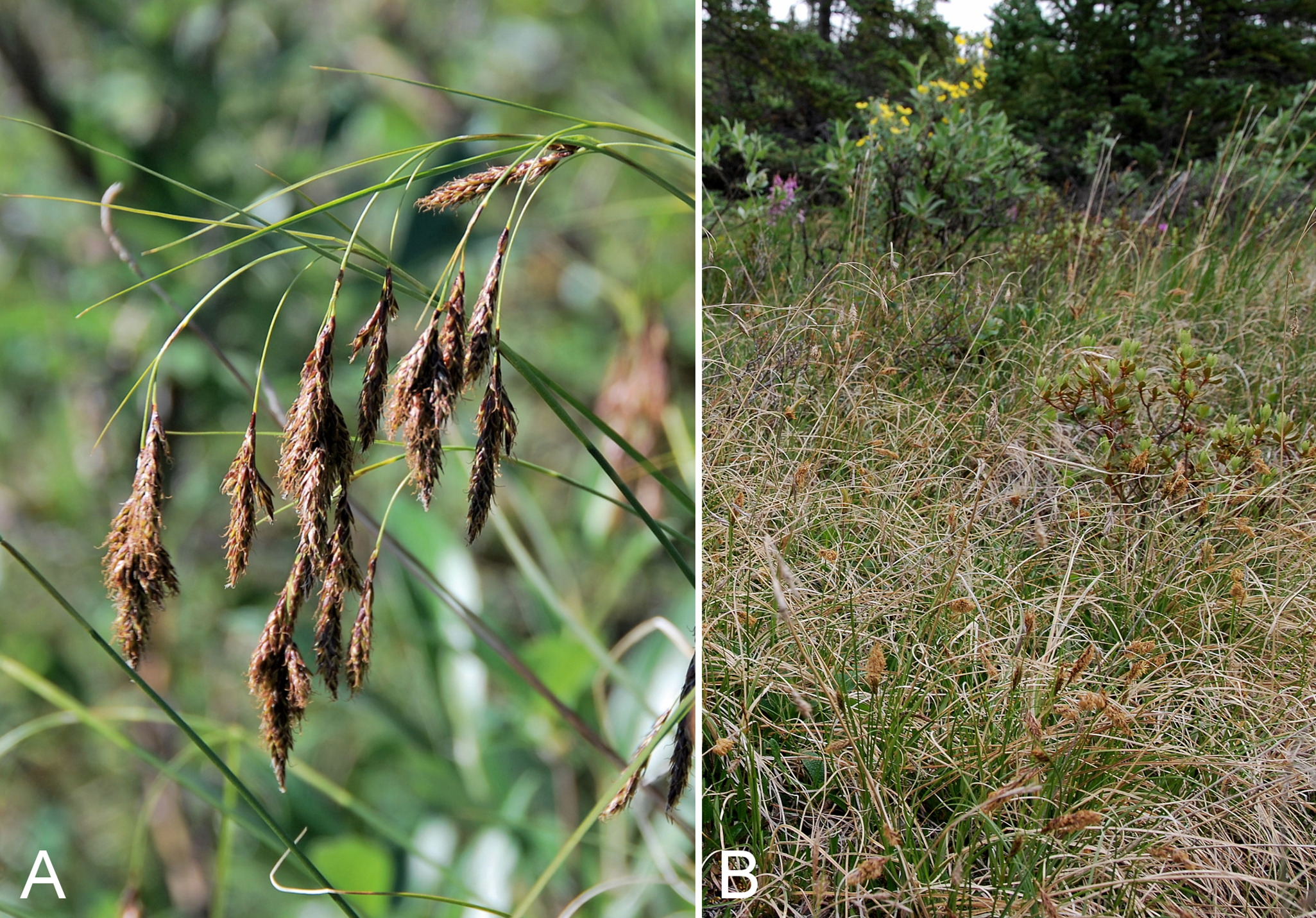

Conservation status
- Apparently Secure (NatureServe)

Scientific classification
- Kingdom: Plantae
- Clade: Tracheophytes
- Clade: Angiosperms
- Clade: Monocots
- Clade: Commelinids
- Order: Poales
- Family: Cyperaceae
- Genus: Carex
- Species: C. petricosa

Binomial name
- Carex petricosa Dewey

= Carex petricosa =

Species of flowering plant

Carex petricosa, also known as the rock-dwelling sedge, is a flowering plant native to Alaska, western Canada, Montana, and Quebec.

== Description ==
The rock-dwelling sedge grows 15–35 cm (6–14 in) high in loose clumps with culms that are 10–90 cm (4–35 in) and have 3-8 spikes that are either female, male (rarely) or both. It has leaves that are 1–3.5 mm (0.04–0.14 in) wide, brown or black translucent staminate scales.

== Variants ==
The varieties can be distinguished by their amount of stigmas and achenes.

- Carex petricosa var. petricosa: 3 stigmas and trigonous achenes
- Carex petricosa var. misandroides: 2 stigmas and biconvex achenes
