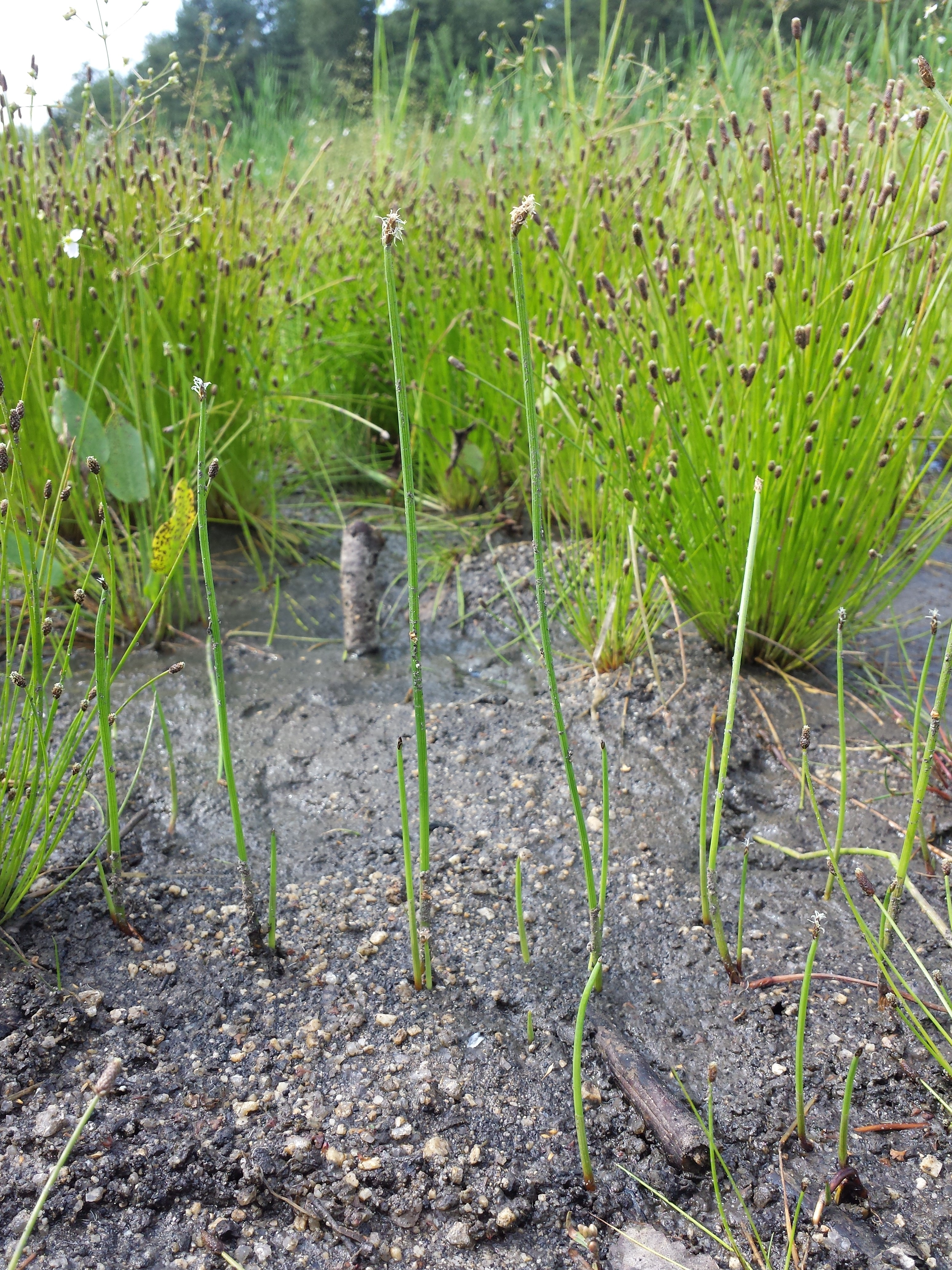

Scientific classification
- Kingdom: Plantae
- Clade: Tracheophytes
- Clade: Angiosperms
- Clade: Monocots
- Clade: Commelinids
- Order: Poales
- Family: Cyperaceae
- Genus: Eleocharis
- Species: E. mamillata

Binomial name
- Eleocharis mamillata (H.Lindb.) H.Lindb.

= Eleocharis mamillata =

Species of grass-like plant

Eleocharis mamillata is a species of flowering plant belonging to the family Cyperaceae.

Its native range is Europe to China, Subarctic America to Northern USA.
