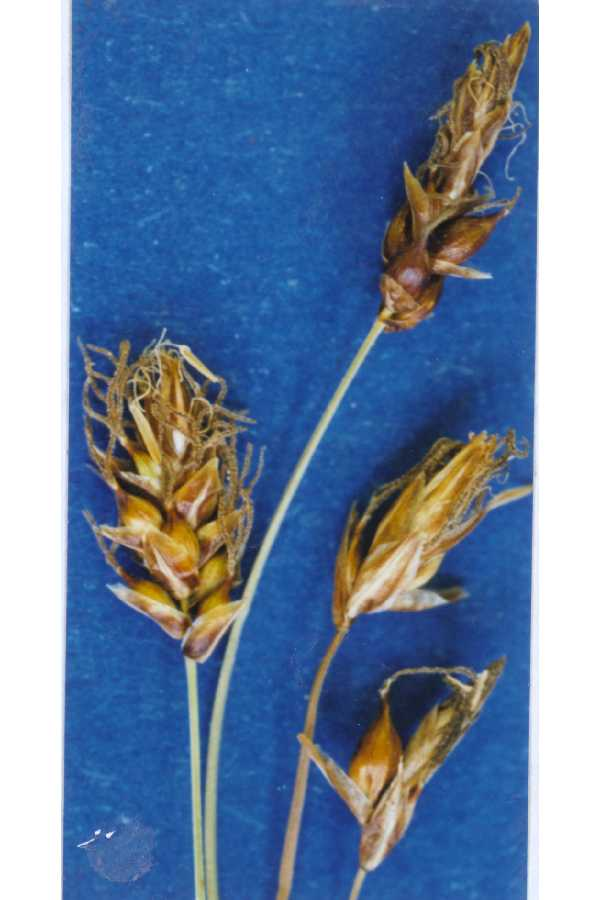

Scientific classification
- Kingdom: Plantae
- Clade: Tracheophytes
- Clade: Angiosperms
- Clade: Monocots
- Clade: Commelinids
- Order: Poales
- Family: Cyperaceae
- Genus: Carex
- Species: C. obtusata

Binomial name
- Carex obtusata Lilj.

= Carex obtusata =

Species of grass-like plant

Carex obtusata (also known as obtuse sedge) is a species of sedge in the massive genus Carex.

It is native to Canada.
