= Carex williamsii =

Scientific classification
- Kingdom: Plantae
- Clade: Tracheophytes
- Clade: Angiosperms
- Clade: Monocots
- Clade: Commelinids
- Order: Poales
- Family: Cyperaceae
- Genus: Carex
- Subgenus: Carex subg. Carex
- Section: Carex sect. Chlorostachyae
- Species: C. williamsii

Binomial name
- Carex williamsii Britton

Species of grass-like plant

Carex williamsii is a species of sedge found in Siberia and northern North America, from Alaska to Greenland.
