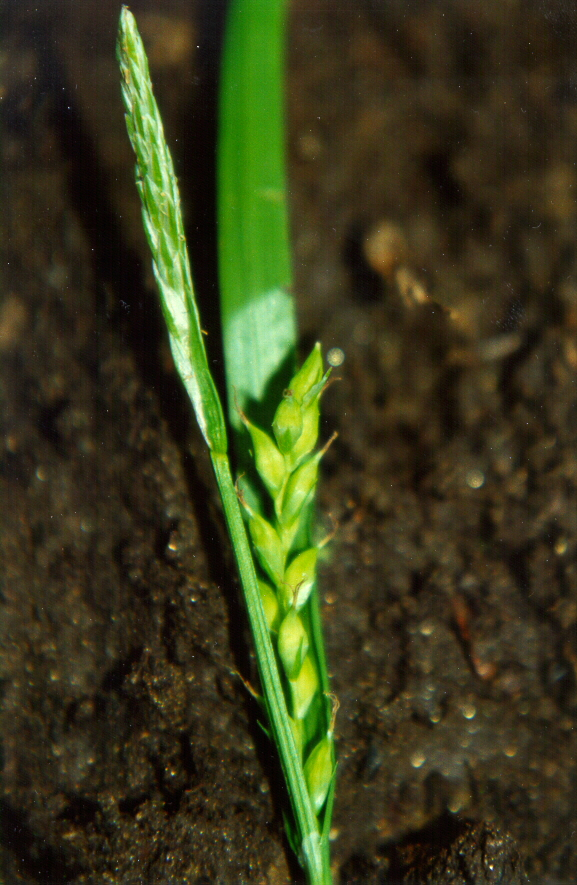

Scientific classification
- Kingdom: Plantae
- Clade: Embryophytes
- Clade: Tracheophytes
- Clade: Angiosperms
- Clade: Monocots
- Clade: Commelinids
- Order: Poales
- Family: Cyperaceae
- Genus: Carex
- Species: C. hendersonii

Binomial name
- Carex hendersonii L.H.Bailey

= Carex hendersonii =

Species of plant

Carex hendersonii, also known as Henderson's sedge or carex de Henderson, is a tussock-forming species of perennial sedge in the family Cyperaceae. It is native to western parts of North America.

== Description ==
The sedge has densely tufted brownish coloured culms that are 45 to 87 cm (18 to 34 in) in length and 2 to 2.2 mm (0.079 to 0.087 in) wide. The green leaves have basal green sheaths that become lighter near the base. The corrugate leaf blades are ascending and are 19 to 52 cm (7.5 to 20.5 in) in length and 3 to 16 mm (0.12 to 0.63 in) wide. The inflorescences occur at the end of lateral stalks as spikes that are 1 to 15 cm (0.39 to 5.91 in) in length. In California it blooms between May and June.

== Taxonomy ==
The species was first described by the botanist Liberty Hyde Bailey in 1887 as a part of the Proceedings of the American Academy of Arts and Sciences. It has one synonym; Carex laxiflora var. plantaginea as described by Olney in 1872.

== Distribution ==
The plant is found in temperate biomes from south western Canada in British Columbia and the range extends down the western parts of the United States through Washington, Oregon to as far south as California. It is just as likely to be found in wetland as non-wetland environments including coastal prairie and oak woodlands.

== See also ==
- List of Carex species
