= Carex meadii =

- In Missouri
- Botanical illustration

Conservation status
- Secure (NatureServe)

Scientific classification
- Kingdom: Plantae
- Clade: Tracheophytes
- Clade: Angiosperms
- Clade: Monocots
- Clade: Commelinids
- Order: Poales
- Family: Cyperaceae
- Genus: Carex
- Species: C. meadii

Binomial name
- Carex meadii Dewey

Synonyms
- Carex douglasii f. meadii (Dewey) Kük.; Carex meadii var. bebbii Arthur; Carex panicea J.Carey; Carex panicea var. meadii Olney ex E.Hall; Carex tetanica var. meadii (Dewey) L.H.Bailey

Species of plant

Carex meadii, called Mead's sedge, is a widespread species of flowering plant in the family Cyperaceae. It is native to south-central and southeastern Canada, the central and eastern United States, and Chihuahua in Mexico. A rhizomatous perennial reaching 0.6 m (2 ft) with bluish-green to grayish-green leaf blades, it prefers it drier than the similar Carex tetanica.
