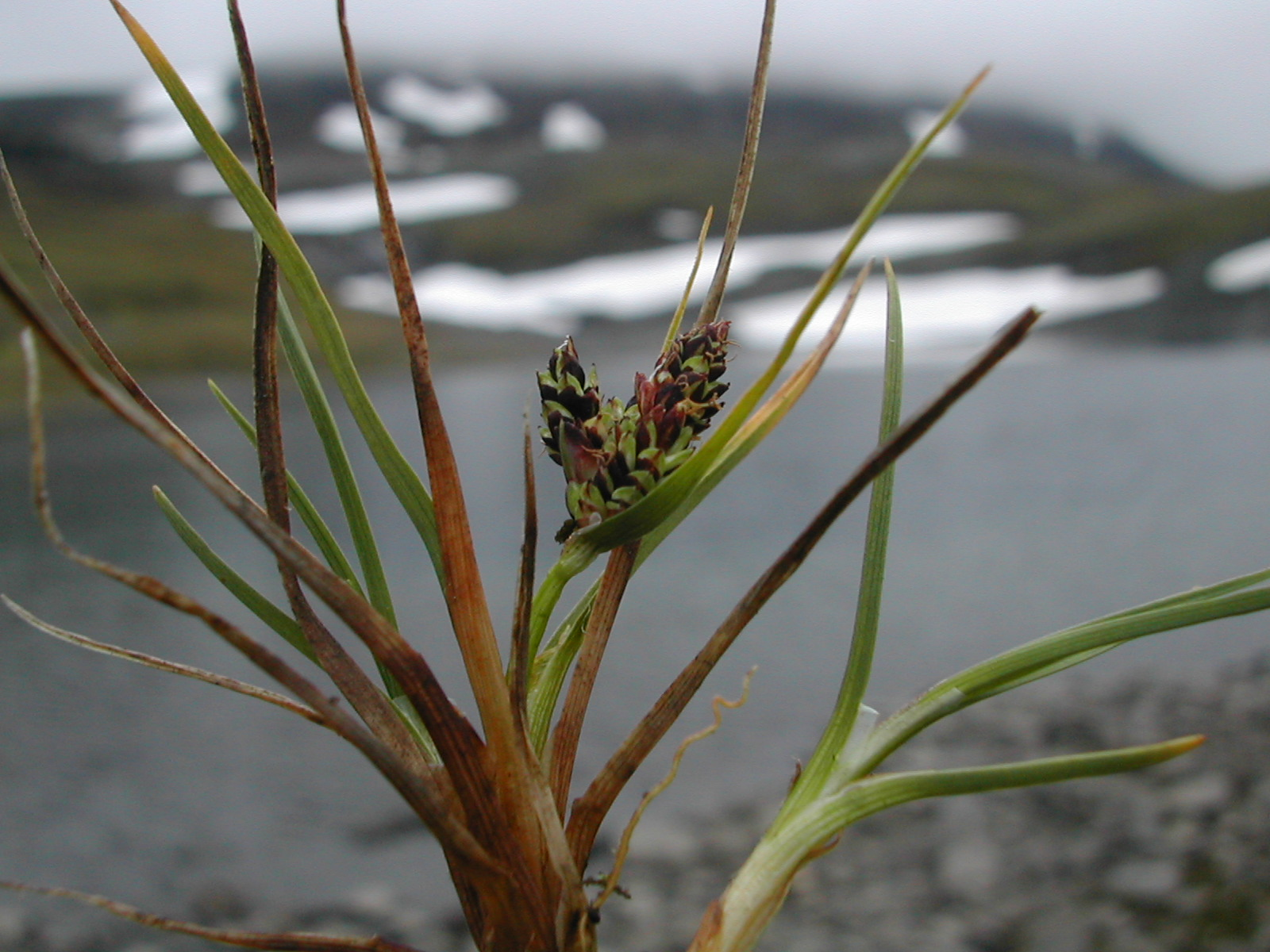

Scientific classification
- Kingdom: Plantae
- Clade: Tracheophytes
- Clade: Angiosperms
- Clade: Monocots
- Clade: Commelinids
- Order: Poales
- Family: Cyperaceae
- Genus: Carex
- Species: C. rufina

Binomial name
- Carex rufina Drejer

= Carex rufina =

Species of grass-like plant

Carex rufina is a species of sedge known by the common name snowbed sedge. It is native to Denmark, Norway, Sweden, Greenland, and northeastern Canada.

This species is a perennial herb growing up to 15 centimetres (6 in) tall. It has sheathed, grasslike leaves no more than 2 millimetres (0.08 in) wide. The lower spikes are female, while the terminal spike is gynecandrous. This inflorescence is often hidden in the leaves, which form a dense tussock. The species often reproduces clonally.

This sedge grows in alpine snowbed habitat. This ecosystem is sensitive to climate change, which causes a rise in the local temperatures and a loss of moisture in the normally wet substrates. Elimination of patches of snowbed causes habitat fragmentation. Drying and changes in the floral composition of the habitat make it less hospitable to the sedge. It has declined, leading to its listing as a near-threatened species in Norway.
