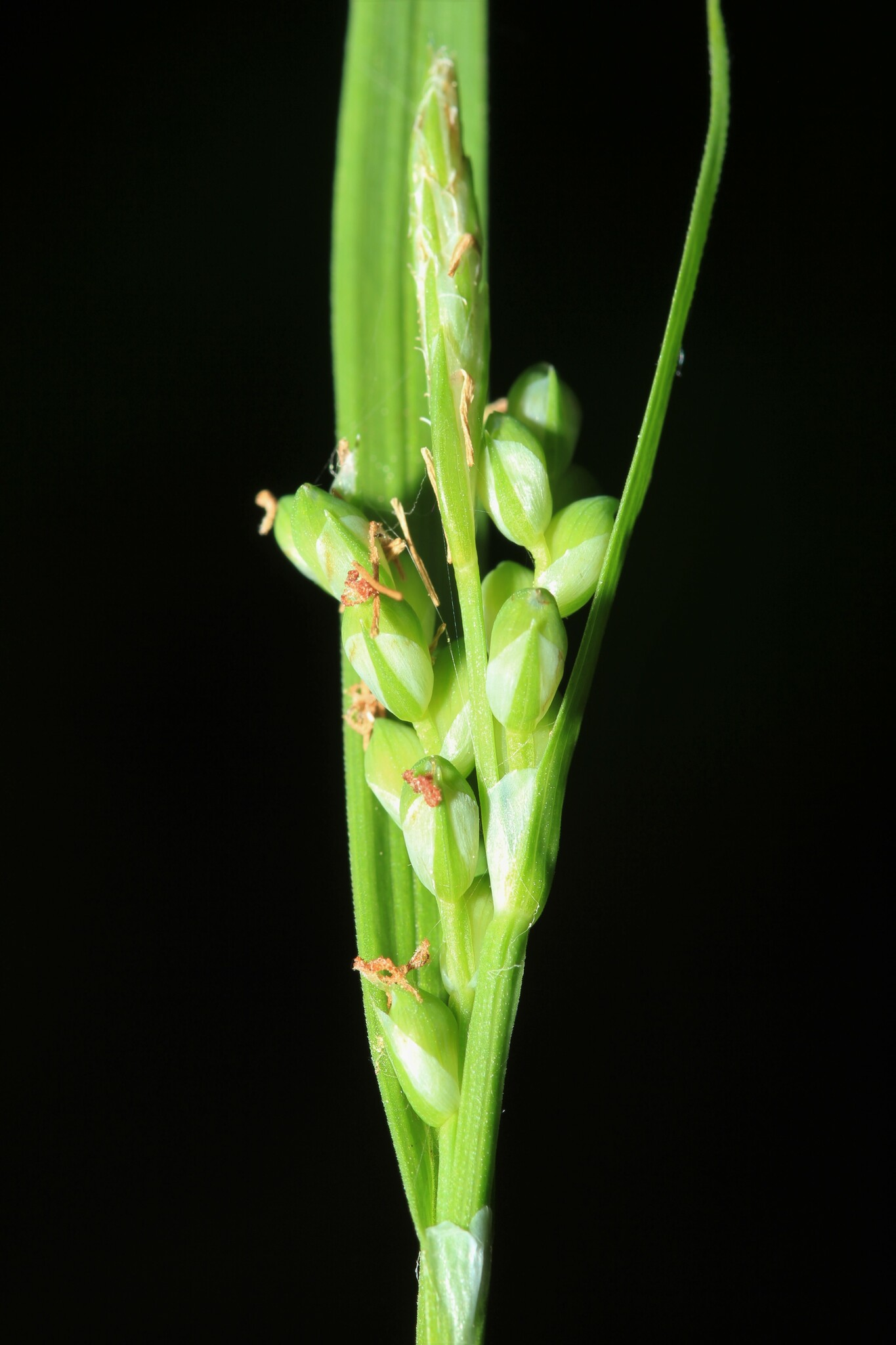

Scientific classification
- Kingdom: Plantae
- Clade: Tracheophytes
- Clade: Angiosperms
- Clade: Monocots
- Clade: Commelinids
- Order: Poales
- Family: Cyperaceae
- Genus: Carex
- Species: C. ormostachya

Binomial name
- Carex ormostachya Wiegand, 1922

= Carex ormostachya =

Species of sedge

Carex ormostachya, also known as necklace spike sedge, is a species of flowering plant in the sedge family, Cyperaceae. It is native to Eastern Canada and the Northeastern United States.

== See also ==
- List of Carex species
