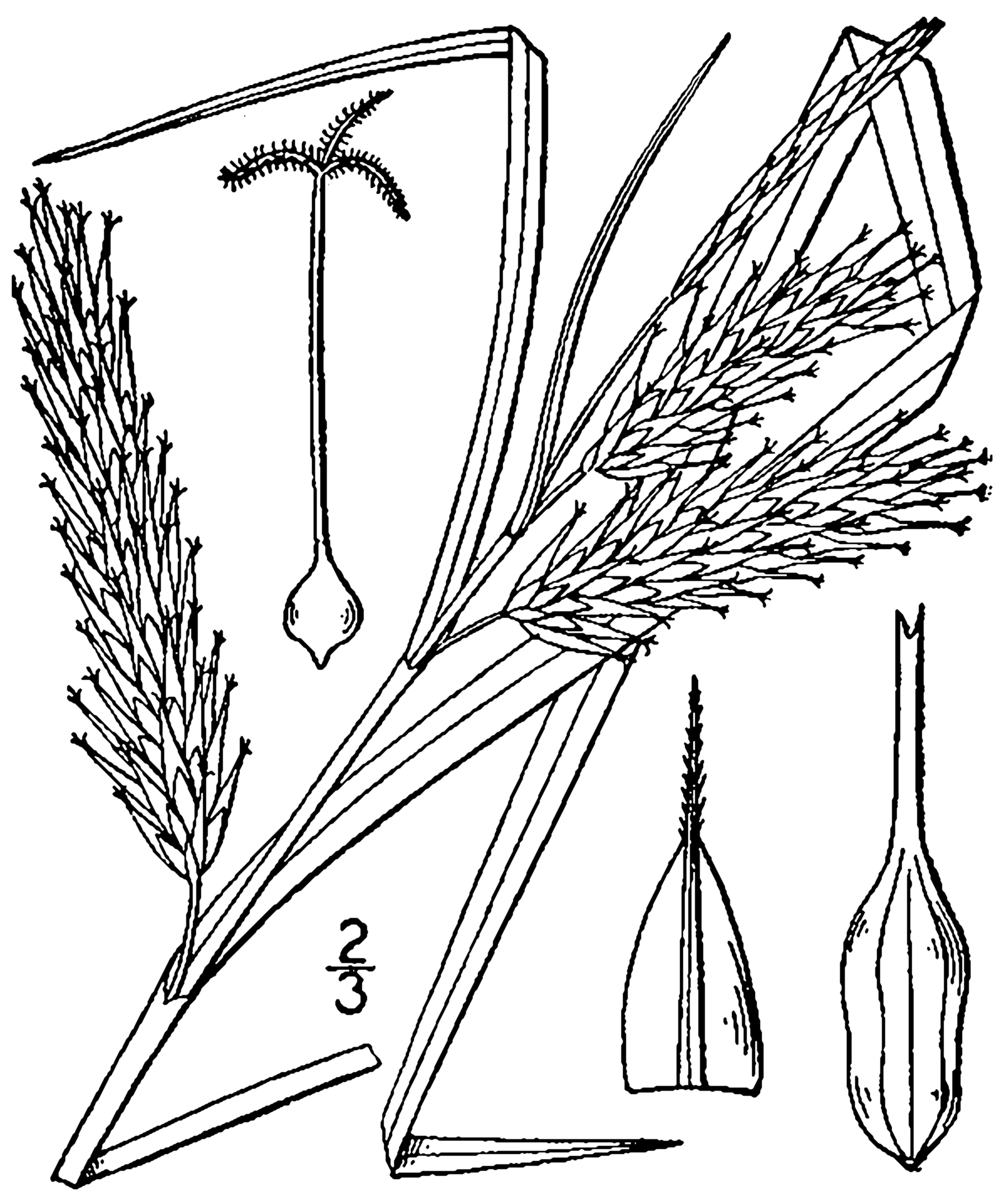
- 1913 botanical illustration

Scientific classification
- Kingdom: Plantae
- Clade: Tracheophytes
- Clade: Angiosperms
- Clade: Monocots
- Clade: Commelinids
- Order: Poales
- Family: Cyperaceae
- Genus: Carex
- Species: C. schweinitzii

Binomial name
- Carex schweinitzii Dewey ex Schwein.

= Carex schweinitzii =

Species of grass-like plant

Carex schweinitzii, common name Schweinitz's sedge, is a Carex species native to North America. It is a perennial.

== Description ==
Carex schweinitzii is a sedge with long, slender rhizomes that range from 0.2–0.65 m (7.9 in – 2 ft 1.6 in) in height. Its ligules are wider than long. Its peduncles are short, and its male spikelets are solitary while its female spikelets are spreading and erect.

== Habitat ==
Carex schweinitzii occurs most often in calcium-rich soils near water, such as in springheads, springy seeps, and wet ground along cold spring-fed streams. More rarely the plant occurs in mixed or coniferous cover and even in the open. The plant is mostly local but is abundant where it is found.

== Conservation status in the United States ==
It is listed as endangered in Connecticut, Massachusetts, North Carolina, Pennsylvania, and Wisconsin. It is listed as threatened in New York and historical in Rhode Island.
