= Carex assiniboinensis =

Scientific classification
- Kingdom: Plantae
- Clade: Tracheophytes
- Clade: Angiosperms
- Clade: Monocots
- Clade: Commelinids
- Order: Poales
- Family: Cyperaceae
- Genus: Carex
- Section: Carex sect. Hymenochlaenae
- Species: C. assiniboinensis

Binomial name
- Carex assiniboinensis W.Boott

Species of sedge

Carex assiniboinensis, commonly known as the assiniboia sedge, is a species of sedge (Carex) in the section Hymenochlaenae. First described scientifically in 1884 by American botanist William Boott, it is found in Canada and the United States, where it grows in floodplain forests, old river channels, riparian woodlands, and shrub thickets.

== Description ==
The plants have clustered, drooping culms that grow 3–7 cm (1.2–2.8 in) high, and leaves measuring 1–2.3 mm wide.
