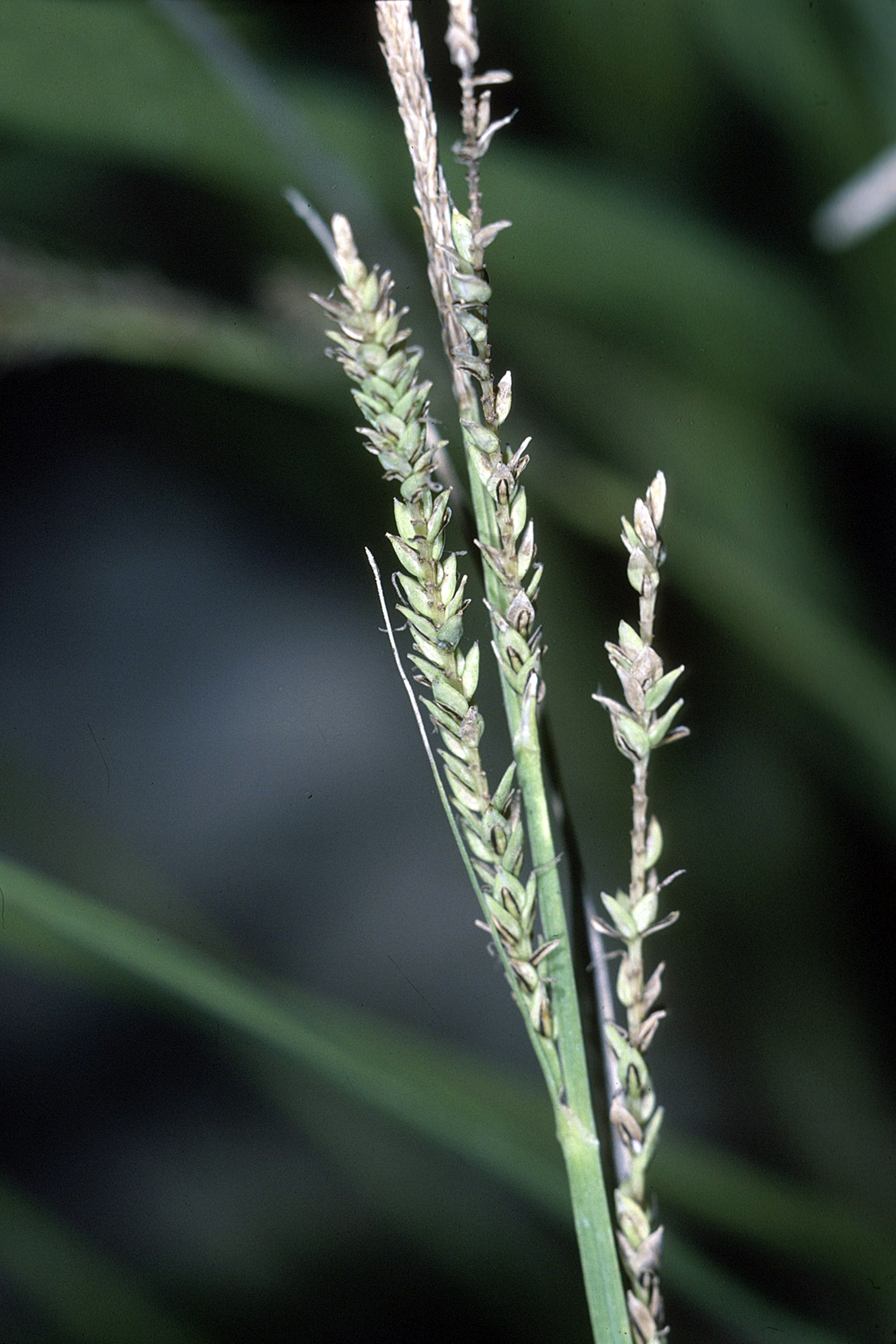

Scientific classification
- Kingdom: Plantae
- Clade: Tracheophytes
- Clade: Angiosperms
- Clade: Monocots
- Clade: Commelinids
- Order: Poales
- Family: Cyperaceae
- Genus: Carex
- Species: C. torta

Binomial name
- Carex torta Boott ex Tuck.

Synonyms
- Carex cespitosa var. ramosa Dewey; Carex torta var. staminata Peck

= Carex torta =

Species of flowering plant

Carex torta, the twisted sedge, is a species of flowering plant in the family Cyperaceae, native to eastern Canada and the central and eastern United States. It is a specialist on gravelly and rocky stream and river banks, moreso when recently scoured.
