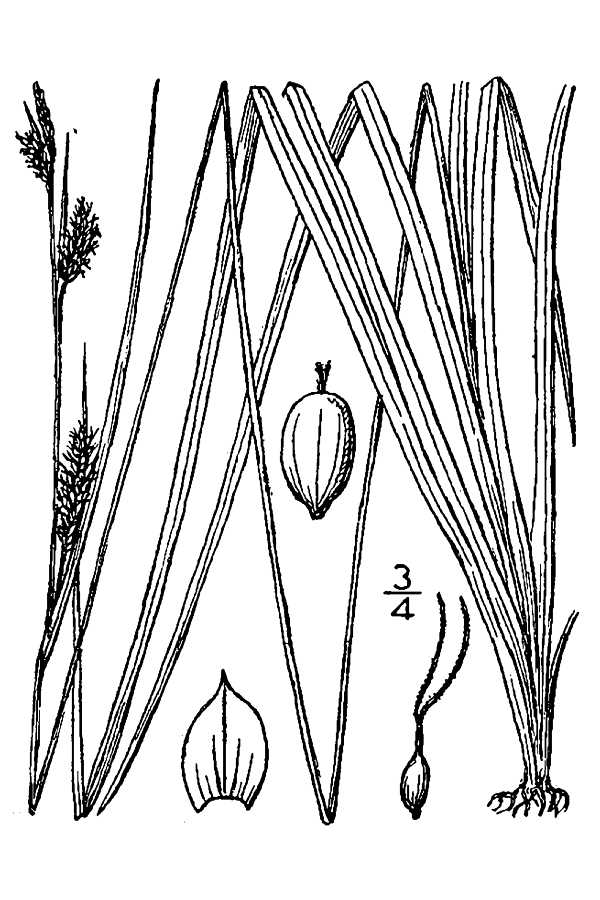

Scientific classification
- Kingdom: Plantae
- Clade: Tracheophytes
- Clade: Angiosperms
- Clade: Monocots
- Clade: Commelinids
- Order: Poales
- Family: Cyperaceae
- Genus: Carex
- Species: C. hassei

Binomial name
- Carex hassei L.H.Bailey

Synonyms
- Carex saliniformis

= Carex hassei =

Species of grass-like plant

Carex hassei is a species of sedge known by the common name salt sedge. It is native to western North America from British Columbia to Baja California to New Mexico, where it grows in moist places, such as meadows.

== Description ==
This sedge, Carex hassei, is similar to the Golden sedge, Carex aurea, and has sometimes been treated as part of that species. It produces stems up to about 40 centimeters tall, or sometimes taller. The inflorescence has a long, leaflike bract that is longer than the spikes. The flowers have reddish-brown, white-tipped scales and the fruit is coated in a perigynium which is fleshy, bumpy, and light in color.
