= Carex leavenworthii =

- With human fingers for scale
- In Kiba Park, Tokyo

Conservation status
- Secure (NatureServe)

Scientific classification
- Kingdom: Plantae
- Clade: Tracheophytes
- Clade: Angiosperms
- Clade: Monocots
- Clade: Commelinids
- Order: Poales
- Family: Cyperaceae
- Genus: Carex
- Species: C. leavenworthii

Binomial name
- Carex leavenworthii Dewey

Synonyms
- Carex cephalophora var. angustifolia Boott; Carex cephalophora var. leavenworthii (Dewey) Kük.

Species of plant

Carex leavenworthii, called Leavenworth's sedge, is a species of flowering plant in the family Cyperaceae. It is native to southern Ontario and the central and eastern United States, and it has been introduced to California and Japan. A perennial with deep green leaf blades reaching 32 in (80 cm), it can tolerate a wide variety of habitats and soil types and is herbivore-resistant, and so it has found use as an ornamental and a mowable lawn grass alternative.
