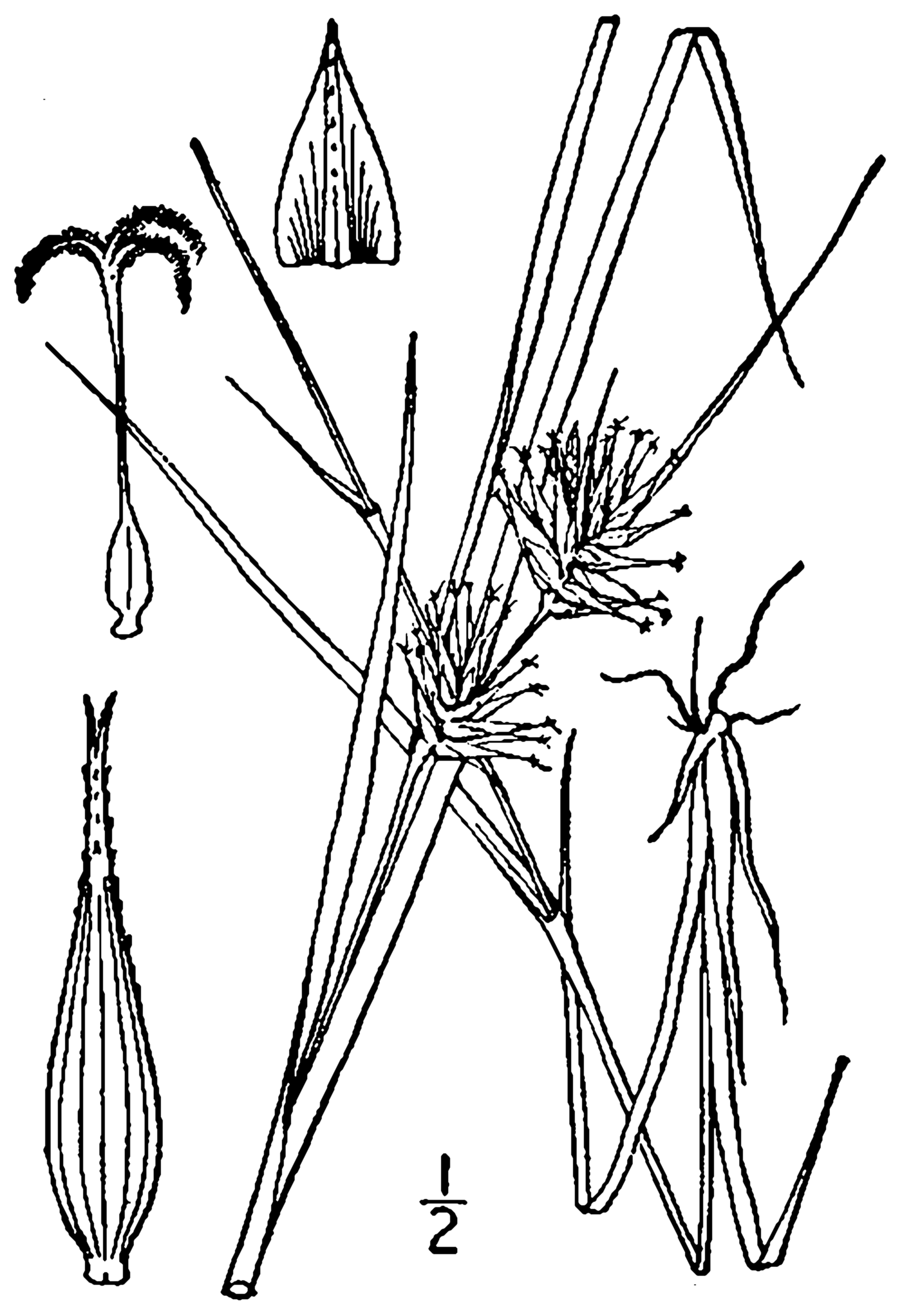

Conservation status
- Least Concern (IUCN 3.1)

Scientific classification
- Kingdom: Plantae
- Clade: Tracheophytes
- Clade: Angiosperms
- Clade: Monocots
- Clade: Commelinids
- Order: Poales
- Family: Cyperaceae
- Genus: Carex
- Species: C. michauxiana

Binomial name
- Carex michauxiana Boeckeler

= Carex michauxiana =

Species of plant

Carex michauxiana, also known as Michaux's sedge, carex de Michaux or yellowish sedge in Canada, is a tussock-forming species of perennial sedge in the family Cyperaceae. It is native to eastern parts of North America and parts of Asia.

== Description ==
The sedge has a tufted habit and is typically 10 to 60 cm (3.9 to 23.6 in) across. It has smooth culms with a triangular cross-section tat are 15 to 70 cm (5.9 to 27.6 in) in length. The yellowish to grenn leaves form from a thin outgrowth at the junction of leafstalk (a ligule). The leaves are flat to M-shaped and 1.2 to 4.6 mm (0.047 to 0.181 in) wide and smooth on the lower surface but covered with small dots on the upper surface particularly toward the end.

== Taxonomy ==
The species was first formally described by the botanist Johann Otto Boeckeler in 1877 as a part of the work Linnaea.. It has three synonyms;

- Carex rostrata Michx.
- Carex xanthophysa var. minor Dewey
- Carex xanthophysa var. nana Dewey.

There are also two recognised subspecies;

- Carex michauxiana subsp. asiatica Hultén
- Carex michauxiana subsp. michauxiana.

It is closely related to Carex dolichocarpa, which is found in Asia.

== Distribution ==
The plant is found in mostly in temperate biomes across the Northern hemisphere. In North America it is found from Saskatchewan in the north west to Newfoundland in the north east down to Minnesota in the south east and New York in the south east. In Asia it is found in far eastern Russia in Kamchatka extending south through Japan and north eastern China. It is also found in New Guinea.

== See also ==
- List of Carex species
