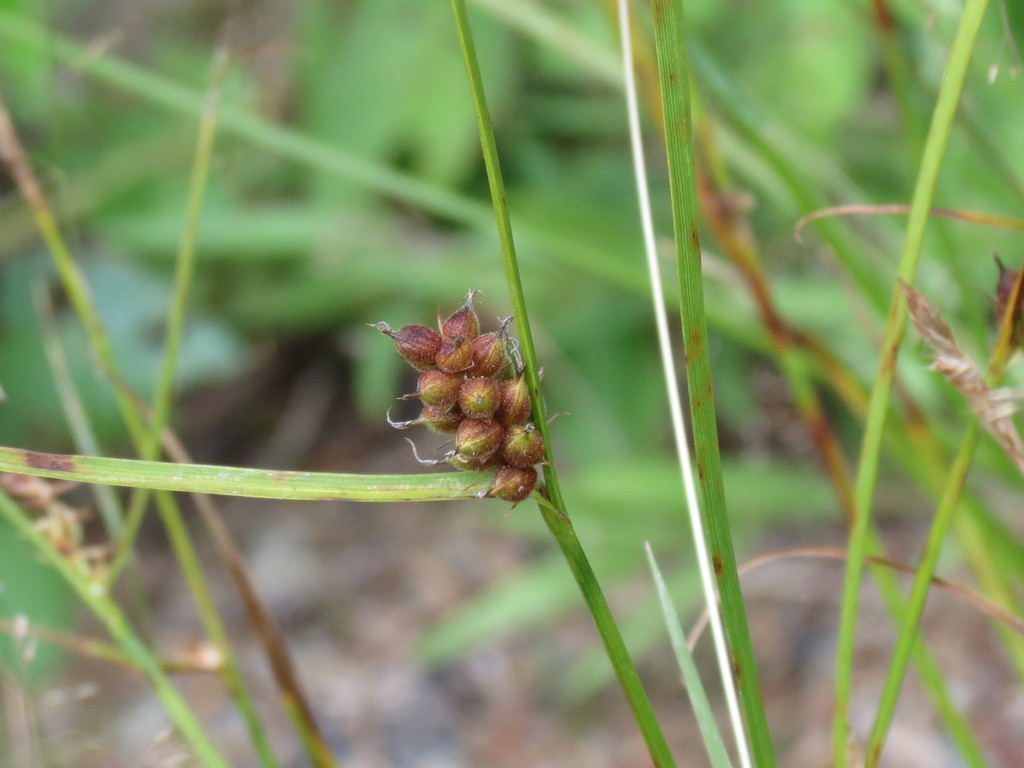

Scientific classification
- Kingdom: Plantae
- Clade: Tracheophytes
- Clade: Angiosperms
- Clade: Monocots
- Clade: Commelinids
- Order: Poales
- Family: Cyperaceae
- Genus: Carex
- Species: C. houghtoniana

Binomial name
- Carex houghtoniana Torr. ex Dewey, 1836

= Carex houghtoniana =

Species of sedge

Carex houghtoniana, also known as Houghton's sedge, is a species of flowering plant in the sedge family, Cyperaceae. It is native to eastern Canada and the northeastern United States.

== See also ==
- List of Carex species
