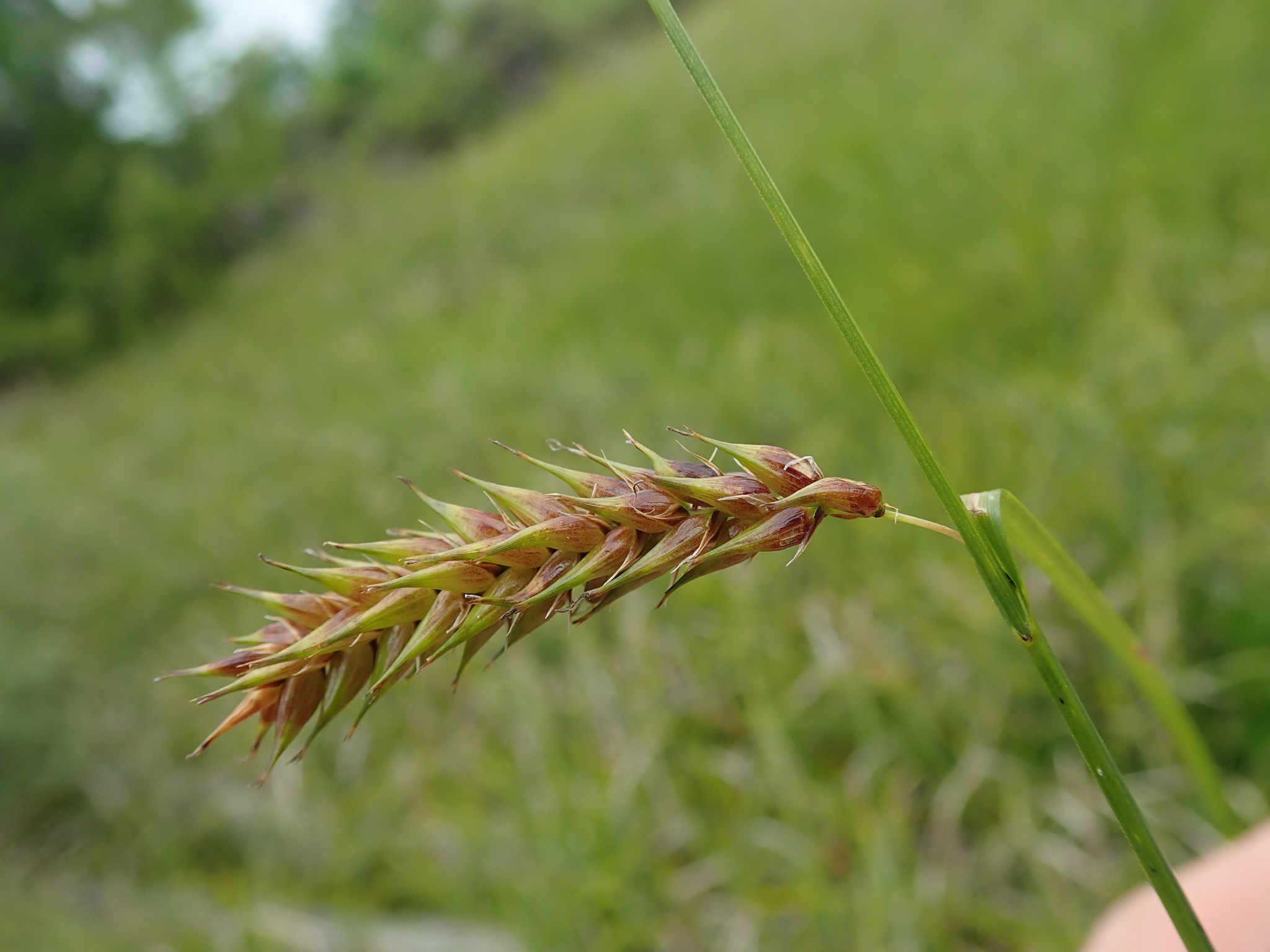
- On Vancouver Island

Scientific classification
- Kingdom: Plantae
- Clade: Tracheophytes
- Clade: Angiosperms
- Clade: Monocots
- Clade: Commelinids
- Order: Poales
- Family: Cyperaceae
- Genus: Carex
- Species: C. exsiccata

Binomial name
- Carex exsiccata L.H.Bailey

Synonyms
- Carex vesicaria var. major Boott

= Carex exsiccata =

Species of flowering plant

Carex exsiccata, the western inflated sedge or beaked sedge (a name it shares with other members of its genus), is a species of flowering plant in the family Cyperaceae, native to British Columbia, Washington state, Oregon, Idaho, Montana, Colorado, and California. Native peoples used its roots to make a black dye.
