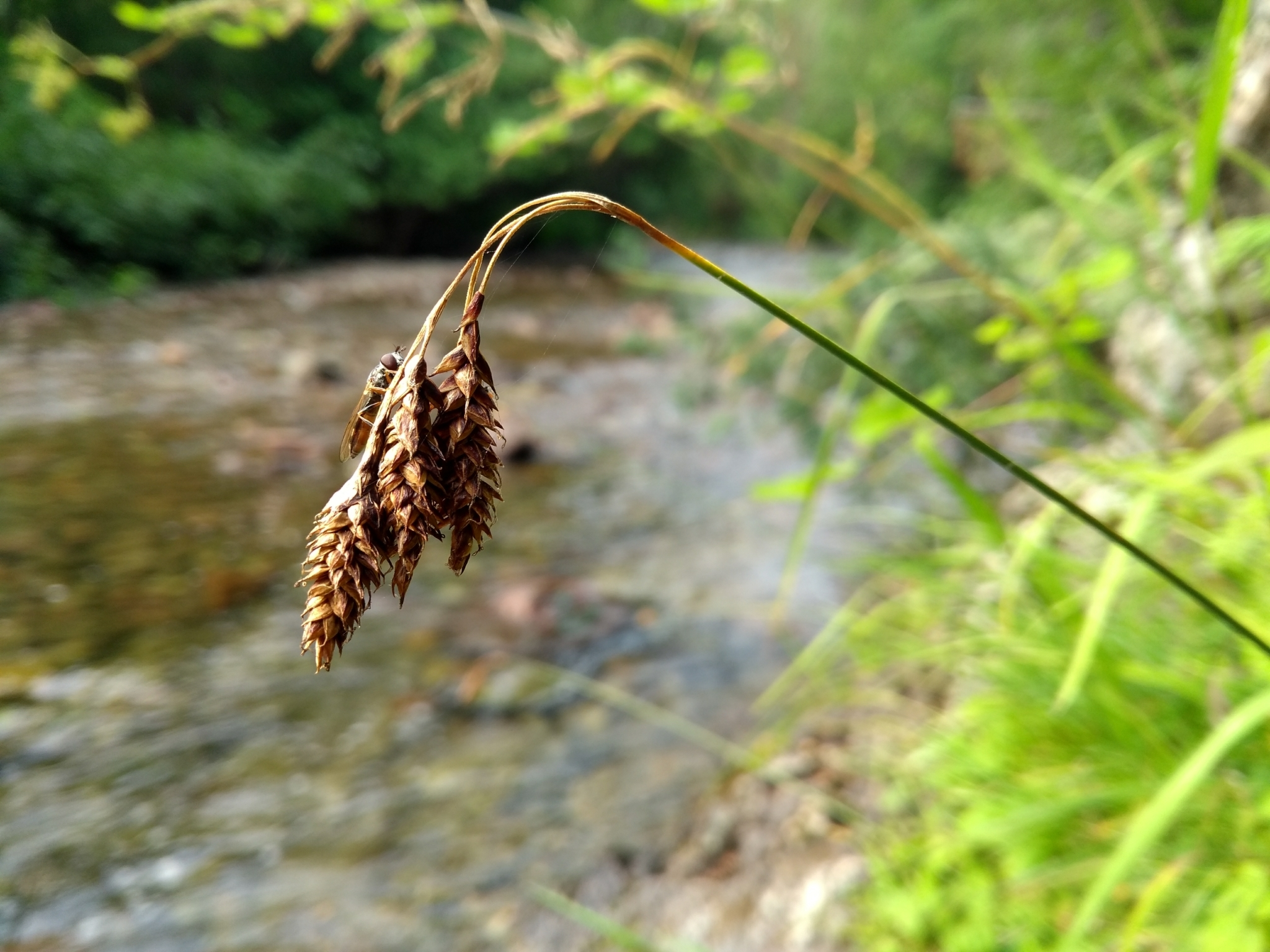

Scientific classification
- Kingdom: Plantae
- Clade: Tracheophytes
- Clade: Angiosperms
- Clade: Monocots
- Clade: Commelinids
- Order: Poales
- Family: Cyperaceae
- Genus: Carex
- Species: C. atratiformis

Binomial name
- Carex atratiformis Britton, 1895

= Carex atratiformis =

Species of sedge

Carex atratiformis, also known as scrabrous black sedge, is a species of flowering plant in the sedge family, Cyperaceae. It is native to Canada and the Northeastern United States.

== See also ==
- List of Carex species
