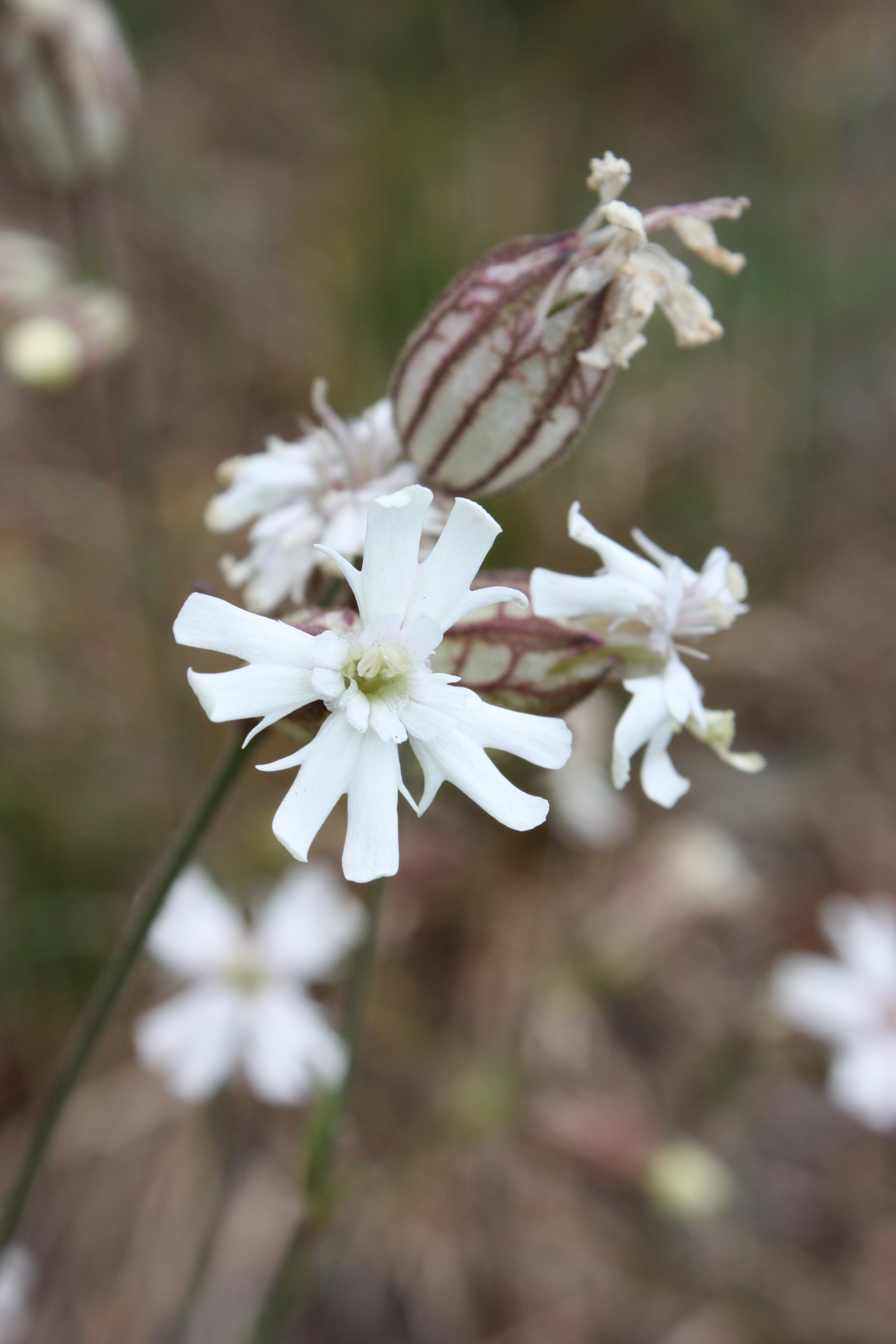

Scientific classification
- Kingdom: Plantae
- Clade: Tracheophytes
- Clade: Angiosperms
- Clade: Eudicots
- Order: Caryophyllales
- Family: Caryophyllaceae
- Genus: Silene
- Species: S. parryi

Binomial name
- Silene parryi (S.Wats.) C.L.Hitchcock & Maguire

= Silene parryi =

Species of flowering plant

Silene parryi is a species of plant in the family Caryophyllaceae known by the common name Parry's silene. Its range includes southern British Columbia and Alberta, Canada, south to Oregon and east to Colorado and western Montana, United States. It is most common from 4,000–11,000 feet (1,200–3,400 m) elevation. Silene parryi is a pubescent and glandular perennial herbaceous plant 200–400 mm (8–16 in) tall. The calyx is tubular with ten contrasting nerves, 12–16 mm (0.5–0.6 in) long. It inflates in fruit. The five-lobed flowers are white, sometimes purple or green-tinged.
