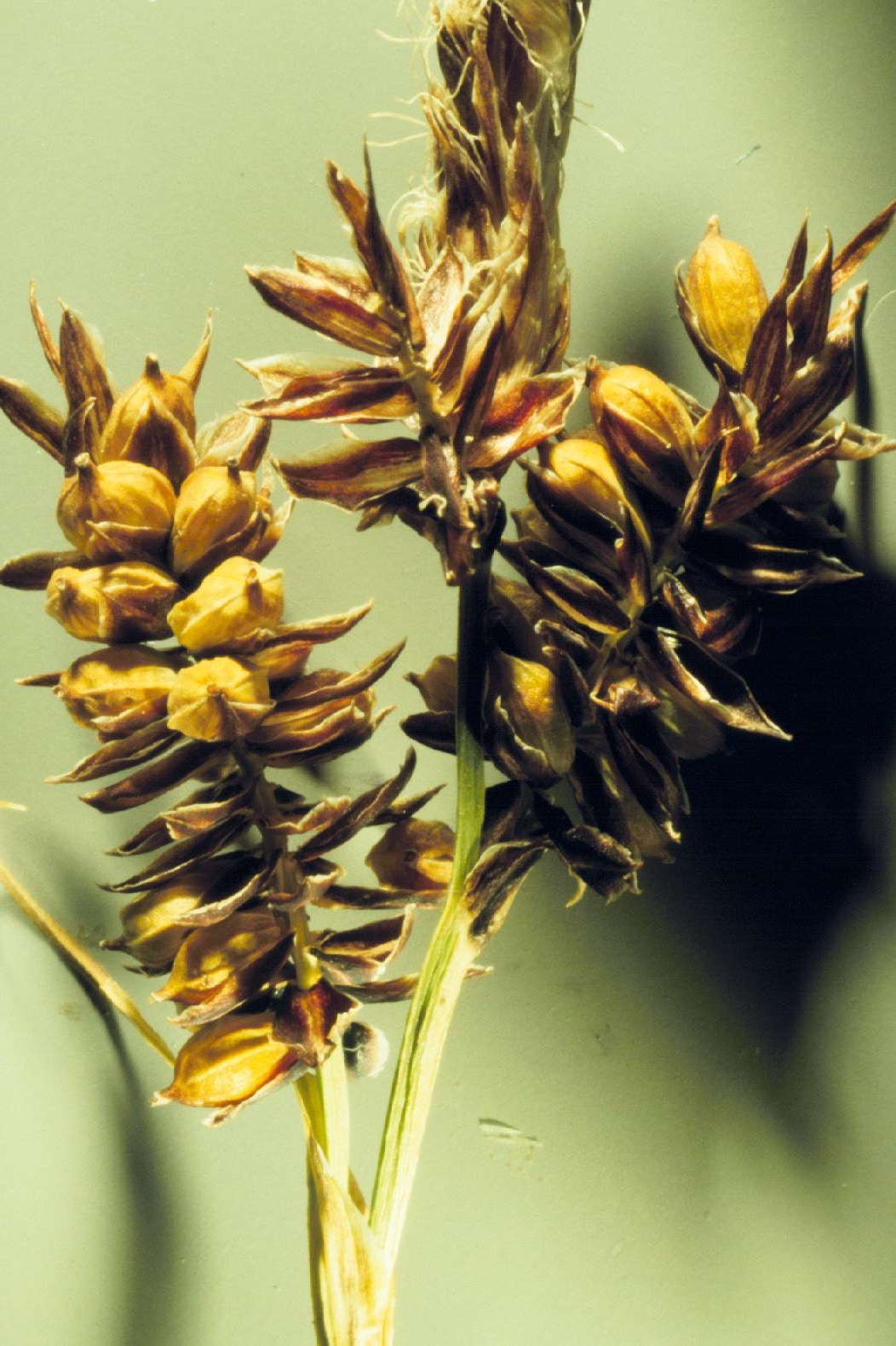

Scientific classification
- Kingdom: Plantae
- Clade: Tracheophytes
- Clade: Angiosperms
- Clade: Monocots
- Clade: Commelinids
- Order: Poales
- Family: Cyperaceae
- Genus: Carex
- Species: C. raynoldsii

Binomial name
- Carex raynoldsii Dewey

Synonyms
- Carex lyallii

= Carex raynoldsii =

Species of grass-like plant

Carex raynoldsii is a species of sedge known by the common name Raynolds' sedge. It is native to western North America and grows in alpine to subalpine meadows.

== Description ==
Carex raynoldsii is sedge produces clumps of smooth stems up to about 75 centimeters in maximum height from a network of rhizomes. The inflorescence is a cluster of separate rounded or oval flower spikes one to two centimeters long, each generally hanging on a peduncle. The female flower has a covering scale which is black, brown, or purple, often with a raised, light colored middle stripe, and produces a rounded fruit.

== Distribution and habitat ==
This sedge is native to western North America from California to Colorado to Yukon, where it grows in mountain meadows in subalpine and alpine climates.
