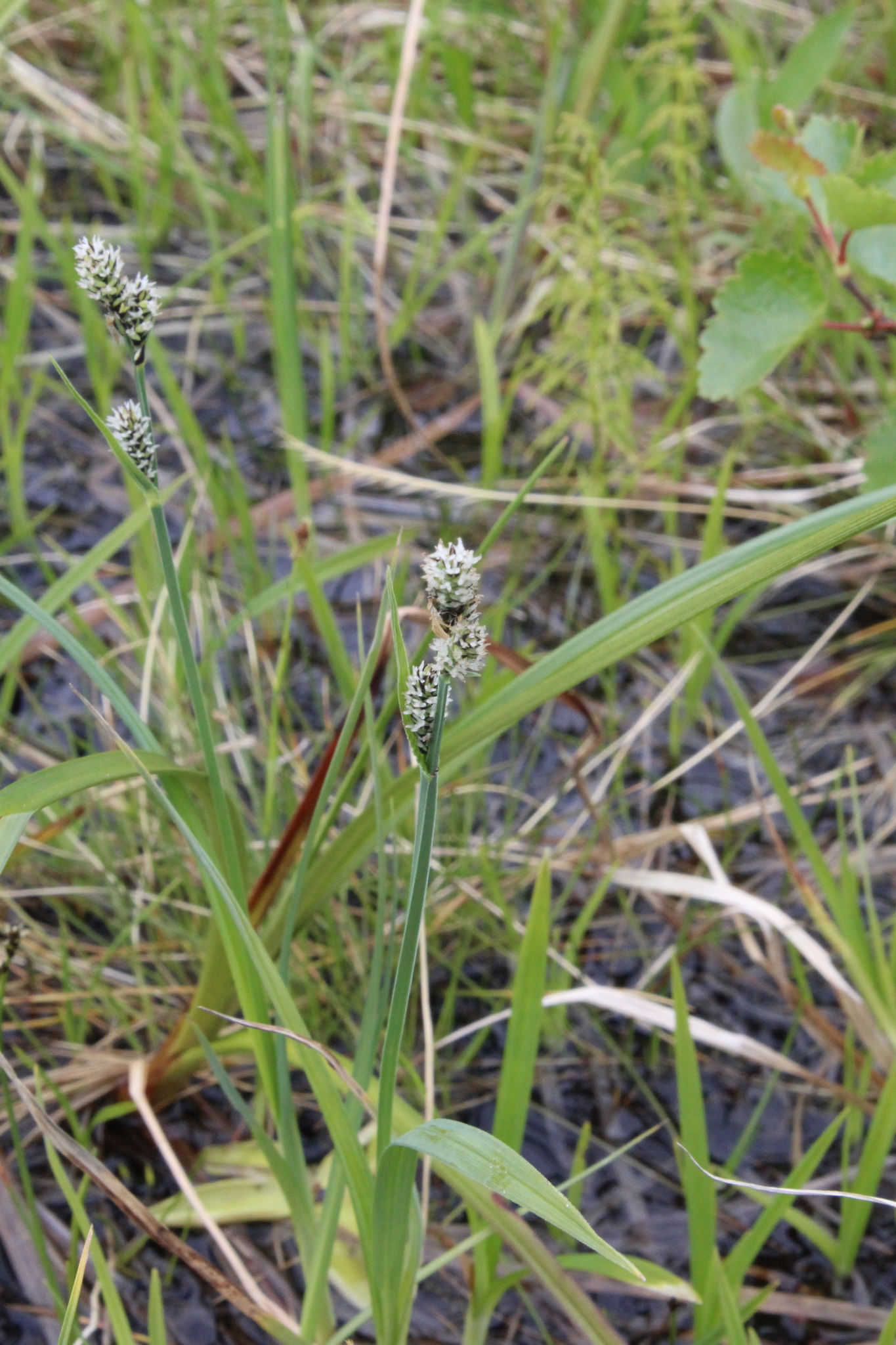

Conservation status
- Apparently Secure (NatureServe)

Scientific classification
- Kingdom: Plantae
- Clade: Tracheophytes
- Clade: Angiosperms
- Clade: Monocots
- Clade: Commelinids
- Order: Poales
- Family: Cyperaceae
- Genus: Carex
- Species: C. adelostoma

Binomial name
- Carex adelostoma V.I.Krecz.

= Carex adelostoma =

Species of plant

Carex adelostoma (common name circumpolar sedge) is a tussock-forming species of perennial sedge in the family Cyperaceae. It is native to the subarctic areas, including Scandinavia, Russia, Canada, and Alaska.

== Description ==
It is a perennial grass-like plant that gets up to 14 inches tall. The fruit type is achene. The perianth is absent. The spikelets color is either green or brown. The fruiting time is between the months of July and August. The distally scabrous culms are between 20 and 35 centimeters long. The leaf blades are between 2-3 millimeters long. The inflorescences are longer than the proximal bracts. the distinct spikes are erect, oblong, and of similar length to each other. The pistillate scales are dark brown and lanceolate. The perigynia is ascending, pale green, and either veined or veinless. the achenes nearly fill the body of the perigynia. The total number of chromosomes in diploid cells (2n) is 106.

== Distribution and habitat ==
It has a global rank of G4, meaning apparently secure. It also has many local ranks in Canada and the US. Including, S4 in Quebec, meaning, again, apparently secure. A S3 rank in the Northwest Territories and Nunavut, meaning it is vulnerable. A S1 rank is found in Alaska and Manitoba, meaning critically imperiled. It also has a SH rank in Labrador, meaning possibly extirpated. It is most commonly found in the months of July, August, and January. It is most commonly found in the countries of Norway, Finland, and Sweden.

== See also ==
- List of Carex species
