= Eleocharis ovata =

Scientific classification
- Kingdom: Plantae
- Clade: Tracheophytes
- Clade: Angiosperms
- Clade: Monocots
- Clade: Commelinids
- Order: Poales
- Family: Cyperaceae
- Genus: Eleocharis
- Species: E. ovata

Binomial name
- Eleocharis ovata (Roth) Roem. & Schult.

Species of plant

Eleocharis ovata, the ovate spikerush, is a species of annual sedge in the family Cyperaceae. They have a self-supporting growth form and have simple, broad leaves and green flowers. Individuals can grow to 1.5 feet.

== Sources ==
This article incorporates text from a free content work. Licensed under CC0 (license statement/permission). Text taken from Eleocharis ovata. Encyclopedia of Life.
