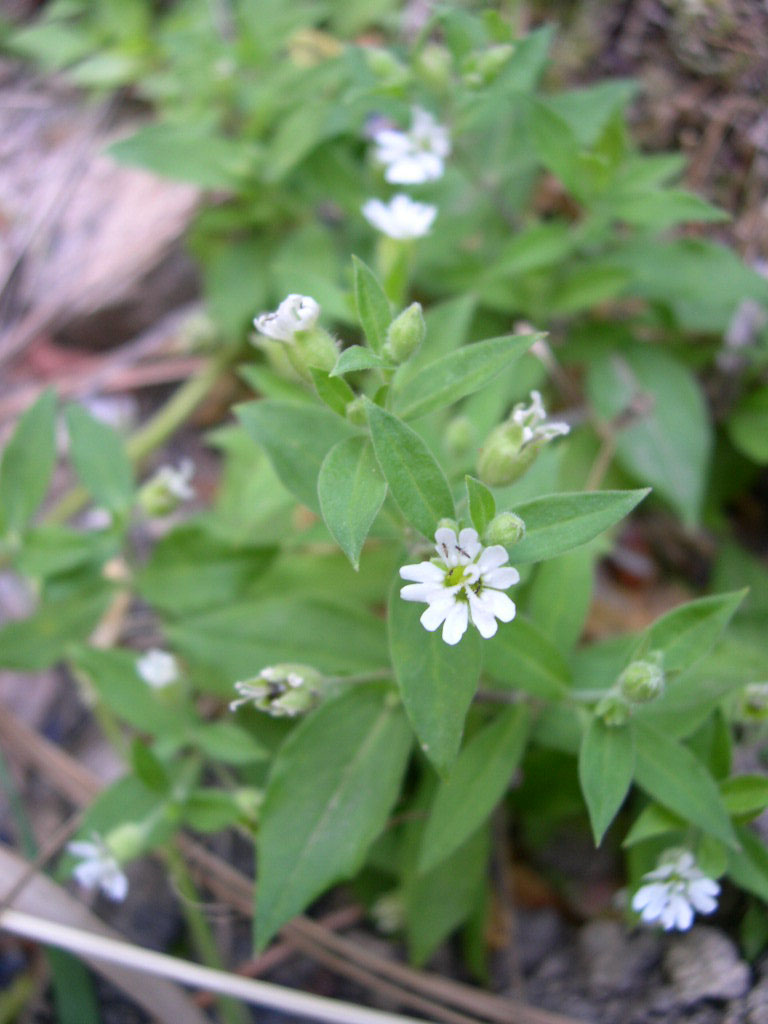

Conservation status
- Secure (NatureServe)

Scientific classification
- Kingdom: Plantae
- Clade: Tracheophytes
- Clade: Angiosperms
- Clade: Eudicots
- Order: Caryophyllales
- Family: Caryophyllaceae
- Genus: Silene
- Species: S. menziesii

Binomial name
- Silene menziesii Hook.

Synonyms
- Anotites menziesii

= Silene menziesii =

Species of flowering plant

Silene menziesii is a species of flowering plant in the family Caryophyllaceae known by the common names Menzies' campion and Menzies' catchfly. It is native to western North America from Alaska through the western half of Canada to the southwestern United States. It can be found in many types of habitat and it is quite common in much of its range. It is variable in morphology and there are a number of varied subtaxa. In general, it is a perennial herb growing from a caudex, appearing matlike, decumbent, or erect, with stems a few centimeters to over half a meter long. It is usually hairy in texture, with upper parts bearing sticky glandular hairs. The leaves are lance-shaped, oppositely arranged in pairs, and a few centimeters in length, upper leaves usually smaller than lower. Flowers may occur in a cyme at the top of the stem, or in leaf axils, or both. Each is encapsulated in a hairy, veined calyx of fused sepals. The petals are white with two lobes at the tips. The plant is dioecious with male and female plants producing different flowers. The male and female flower types look the same externally; the stamens are reduced in female plants and the stigmas are reduced in the male.
