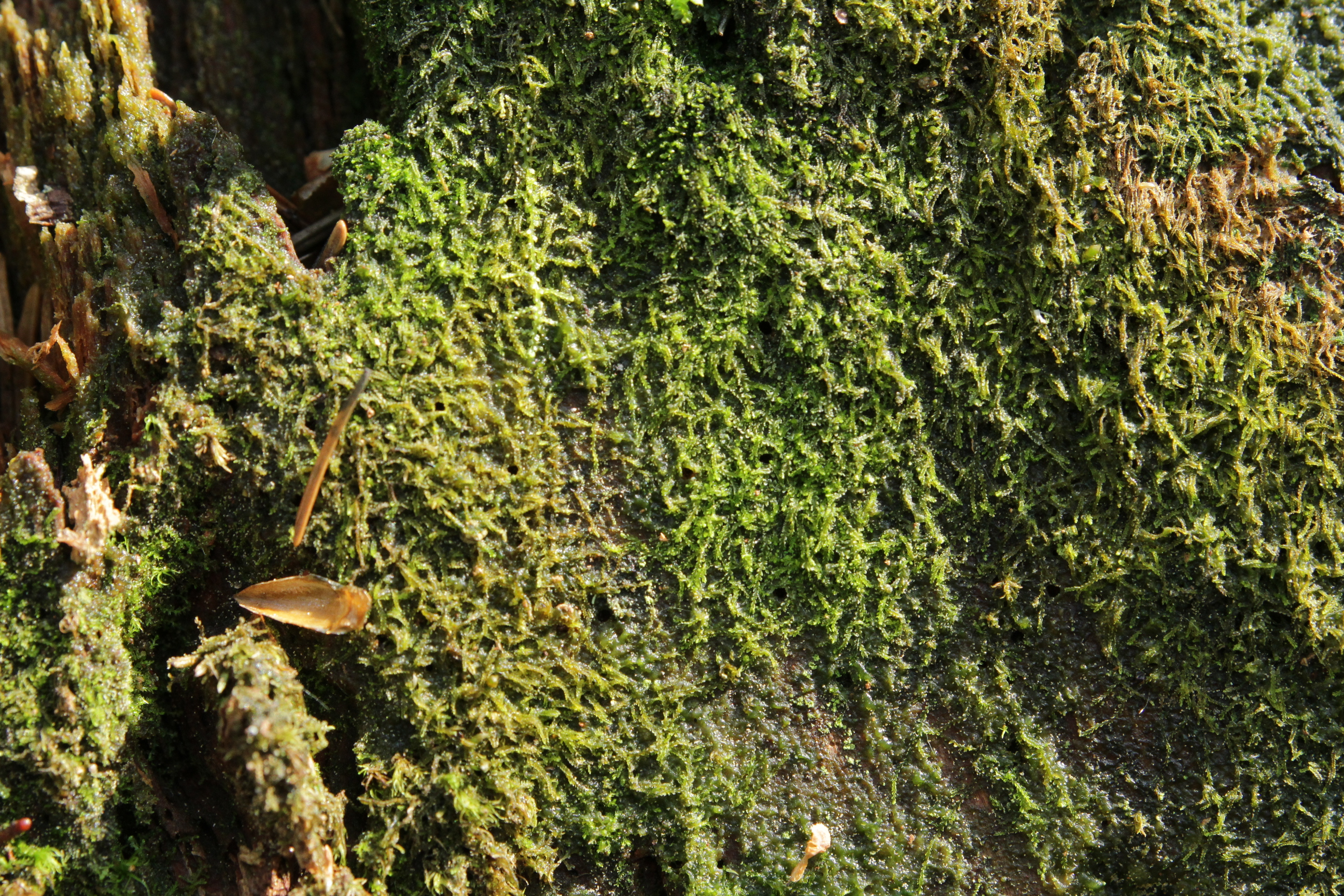

Scientific classification
- Kingdom: Plantae
- Division: Marchantiophyta
- Class: Jungermanniopsida
- Order: Lophoziales
- Family: Cephaloziaceae
- Genus: Cephalozia
- Species: C. catenulata

Binomial name
- Cephalozia catenulata (Huebener) Lindb.

= Cephalozia catenulata =

Species of liverwort

Cephalozia catenulata is a species of liverwort belonging to the family Cephaloziaceae.

It is native to Eurasia and Northern America.

It has cosmopolitan distribution.
