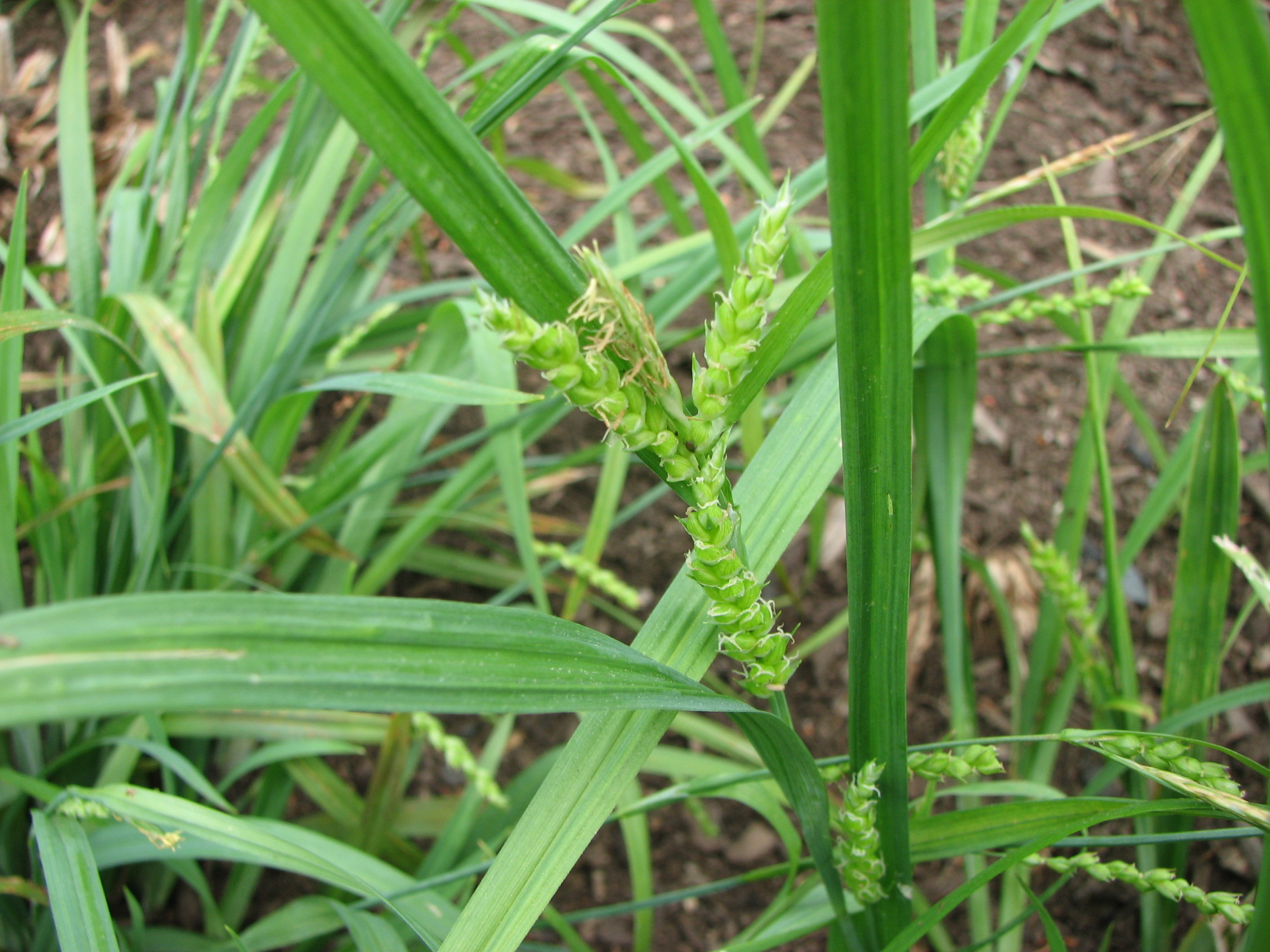
- Fruiting

Scientific classification
- Kingdom: Plantae
- Clade: Tracheophytes
- Clade: Angiosperms
- Clade: Monocots
- Clade: Commelinids
- Order: Poales
- Family: Cyperaceae
- Genus: Carex
- Species: C. flaccosperma

Binomial name
- Carex flaccosperma Dewey

Synonyms
- Carex grisea var. mutica (Torr.) J.Carey; Carex laxiflora var. mutica Torr.; Carex microsperma Steud.; Carex xanthosperma Dewey

= Carex flaccosperma =

Species of grass-like plant

Carex flaccosperma, the blue wood sedge, is a species of flowering plant in the family Cyperaceae, native to the south-central and southeastern US. Preferring to grow in wet, shady situations and deer resistant, it is recommended for shady areas in rain gardens.
