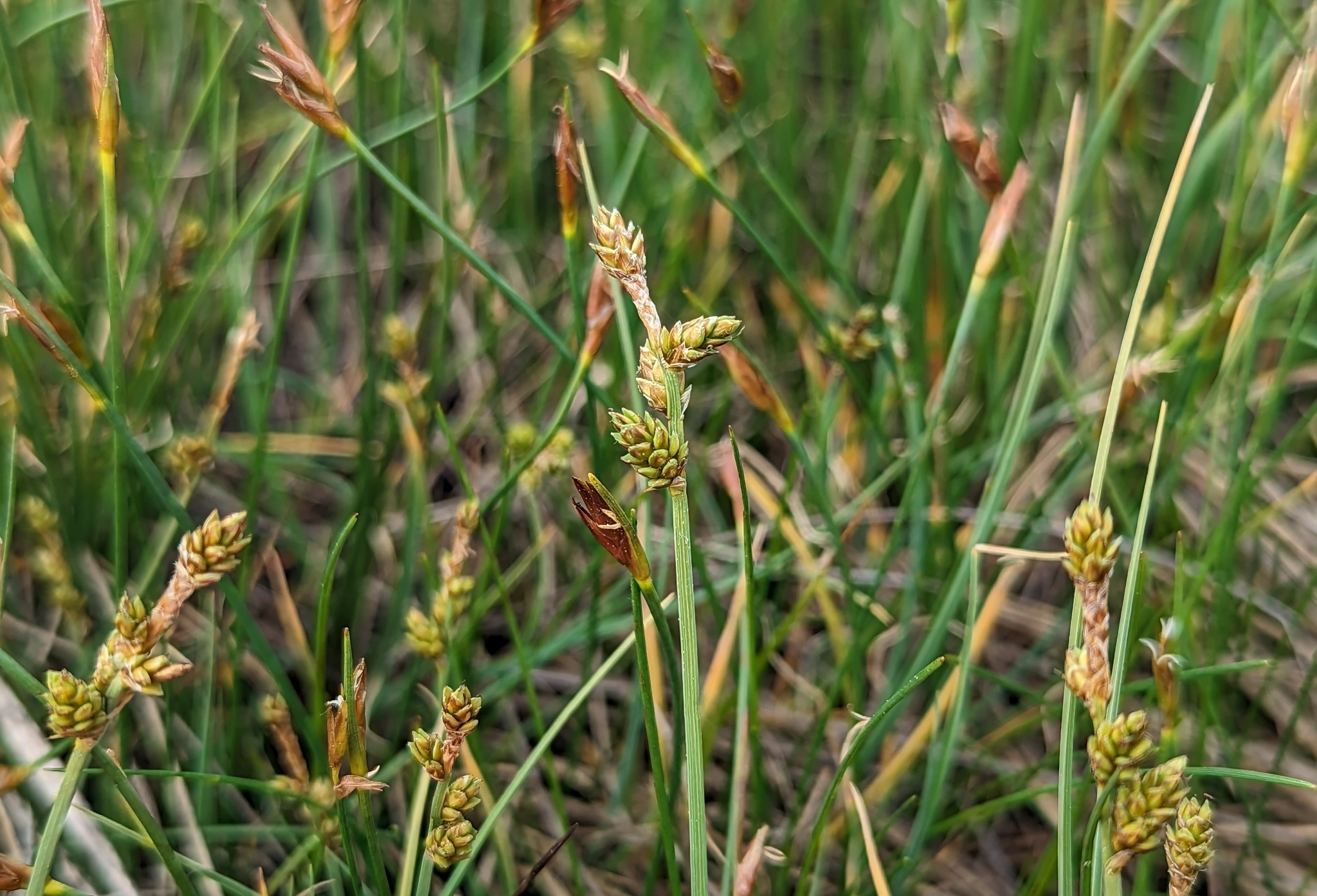

Scientific classification
- Kingdom: Plantae
- Clade: Embryophytes
- Clade: Tracheophytes
- Clade: Spermatophytes
- Clade: Angiosperms
- Clade: Monocots
- Clade: Commelinids
- Order: Poales
- Family: Cyperaceae
- Genus: Carex
- Species: C. mackenziei

Binomial name
- Carex mackenziei V.I.Krecz.

= Carex mackenziei =

Species of grass-like plant

Carex mackenziei is a species of flowering plant belonging to the family Cyperaceae.

Its native range is Northern Europe to Japan, Subarctic America to Northeastern USA.
