= Carex interrupta =

Scientific classification
- Kingdom: Plantae
- Clade: Tracheophytes
- Clade: Angiosperms
- Clade: Monocots
- Clade: Commelinids
- Order: Poales
- Family: Cyperaceae
- Genus: Carex
- Species: C. interrupta

Binomial name
- Carex interrupta Boeckeler

Species of plant

Carex interrupta is a tussock-forming species of perennial sedge in the family Cyperaceae. It is native to south eastern parts of Canada and north eastern parts of the United States.

== Description ==
The sedges tend not to spread forming a turf. They have obtusely angled glabrous culms that are 20 to 75 cm (7.9 to 29.5 in) in length. The leaves have red brown coloured sheaths around the base. The glabrous leaves have a U-shaped apex and are 3 to 5 m (9.8 to 16.4 ft) wide. The inflorescence has a width of 2 to 3 mm (0.079 to 0.118 in) with erect spikes with four to seven spikes located near the point of attachment and one to two located at the end. The spikes are 4 to 9 cm (1.6 to 3.5 in) in length and 3 to 4 mm (0.12 to 0.16 in) wide. It fruits between July and August.

== Taxonomy ==
The species was first formally described by the botanist Johann Otto Boeckeler in 1876 as a part of the work Linnaea. It has three synonyms;

- Carex angustata var. verticillata Boott
- Carex interrupta var. distenta Kük.
- Carex verticillata Boott.

== Distribution ==
The plant is usually found growing in sandy soils along rivers and in wet meadows in temperate biomes with a range that extends from British Columbia in the north down to Oregon in the south.

== See also ==
- List of Carex species
