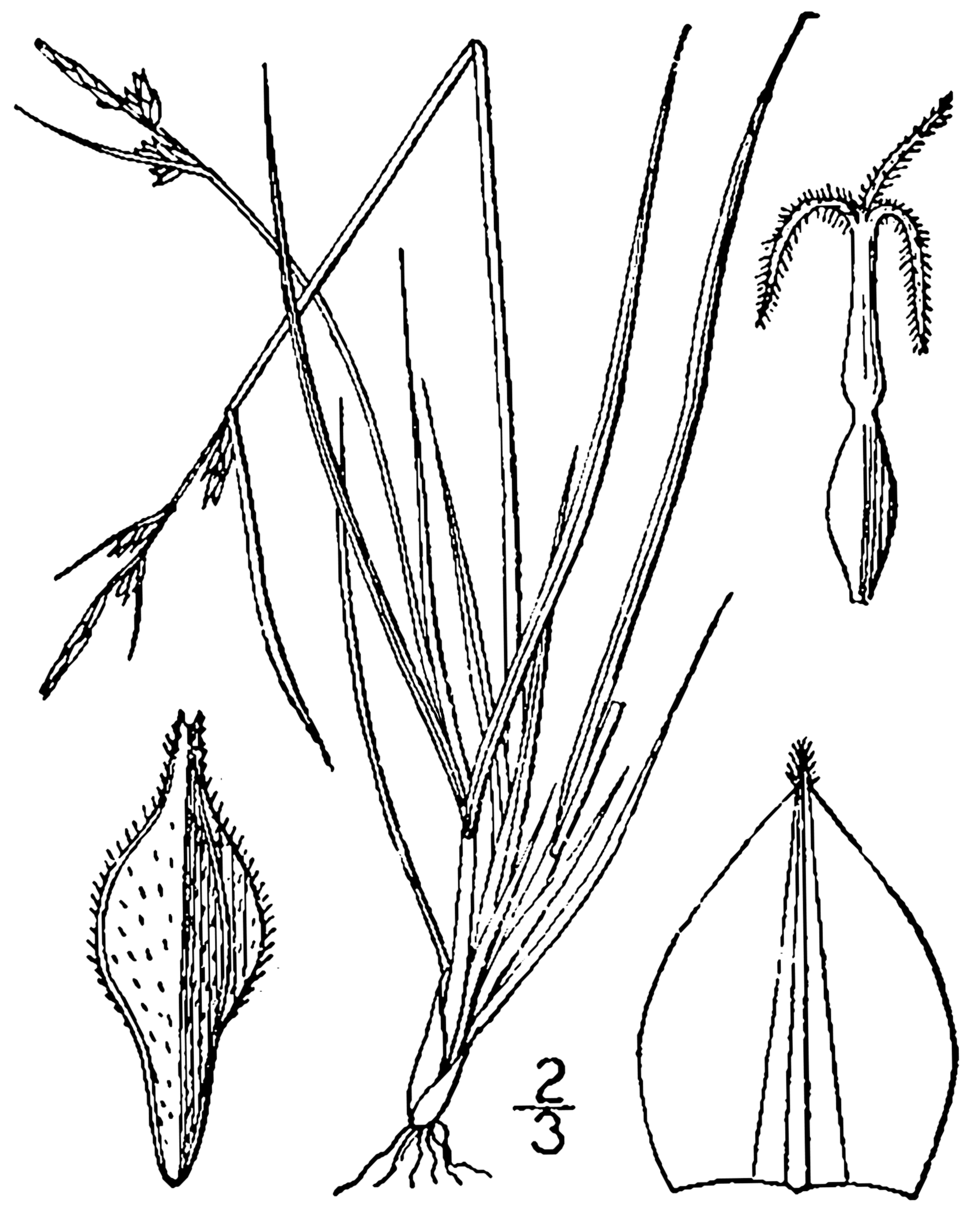

Scientific classification
- Kingdom: Plantae
- Clade: Tracheophytes
- Clade: Angiosperms
- Clade: Monocots
- Clade: Commelinids
- Order: Poales
- Family: Cyperaceae
- Genus: Carex
- Species: C. novae-angliae

Binomial name
- Carex novae-angliae Schwein.

= Carex novae-angliae =

Species of grass-like plant

Carex novae-angliae, the New England sedge, is a Carex species that is native to North America.

== Description ==
Carex novae-angliae is loosely tufted, with ascending to erect rhizomes. The rhizomes are slender and reddish-brown, and range from 1–20 mm (0.039–0.787 in) in diameter. The culms of the plant are 5–40 cm (2.0–15.7 in) long and slightly rough.

The inflorescences of the plant have both staminate and proximate spikes, with peduncles of staminate spikes 1.9–5.9 mm (0.075–0.232 in) long.

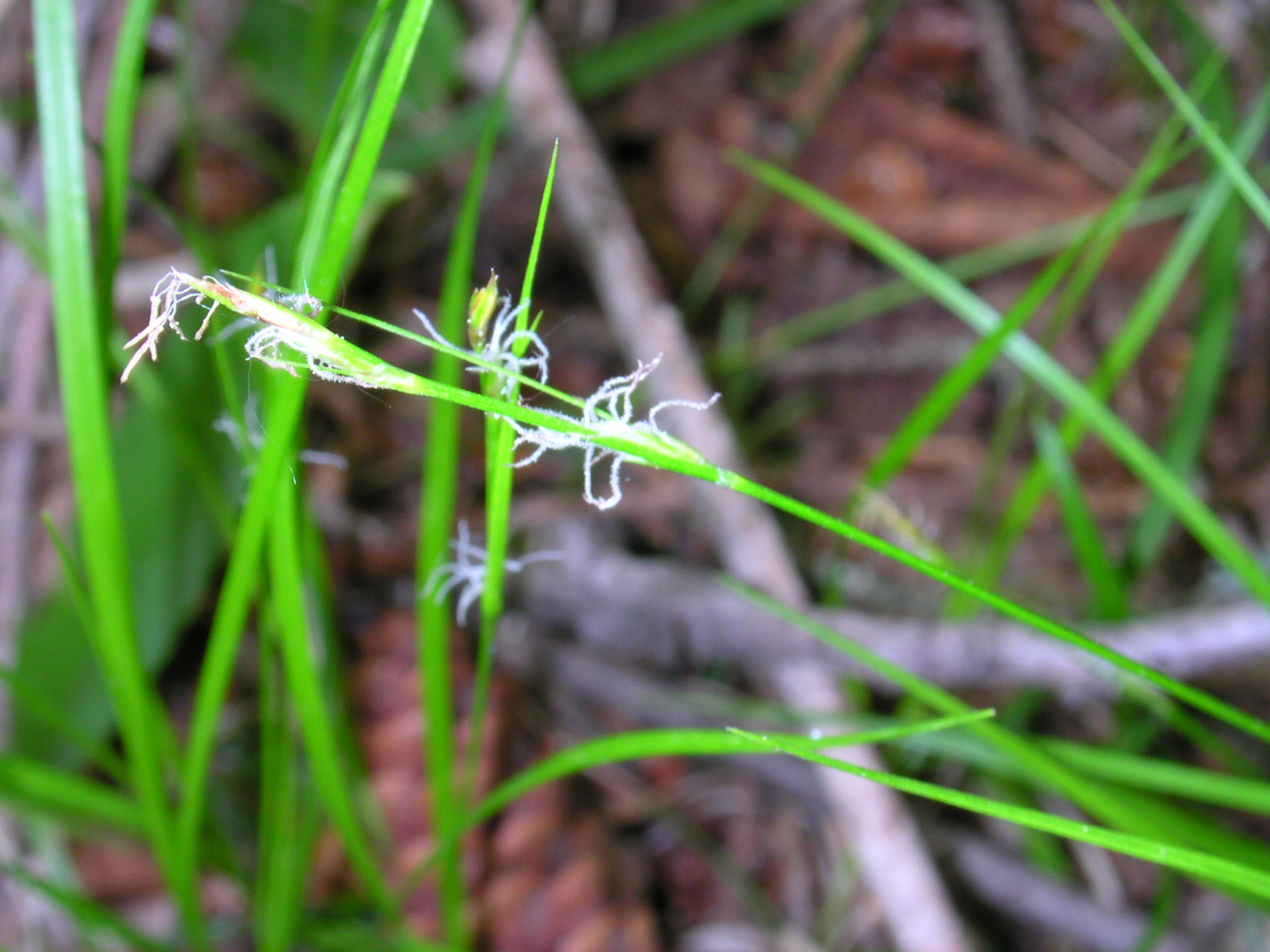

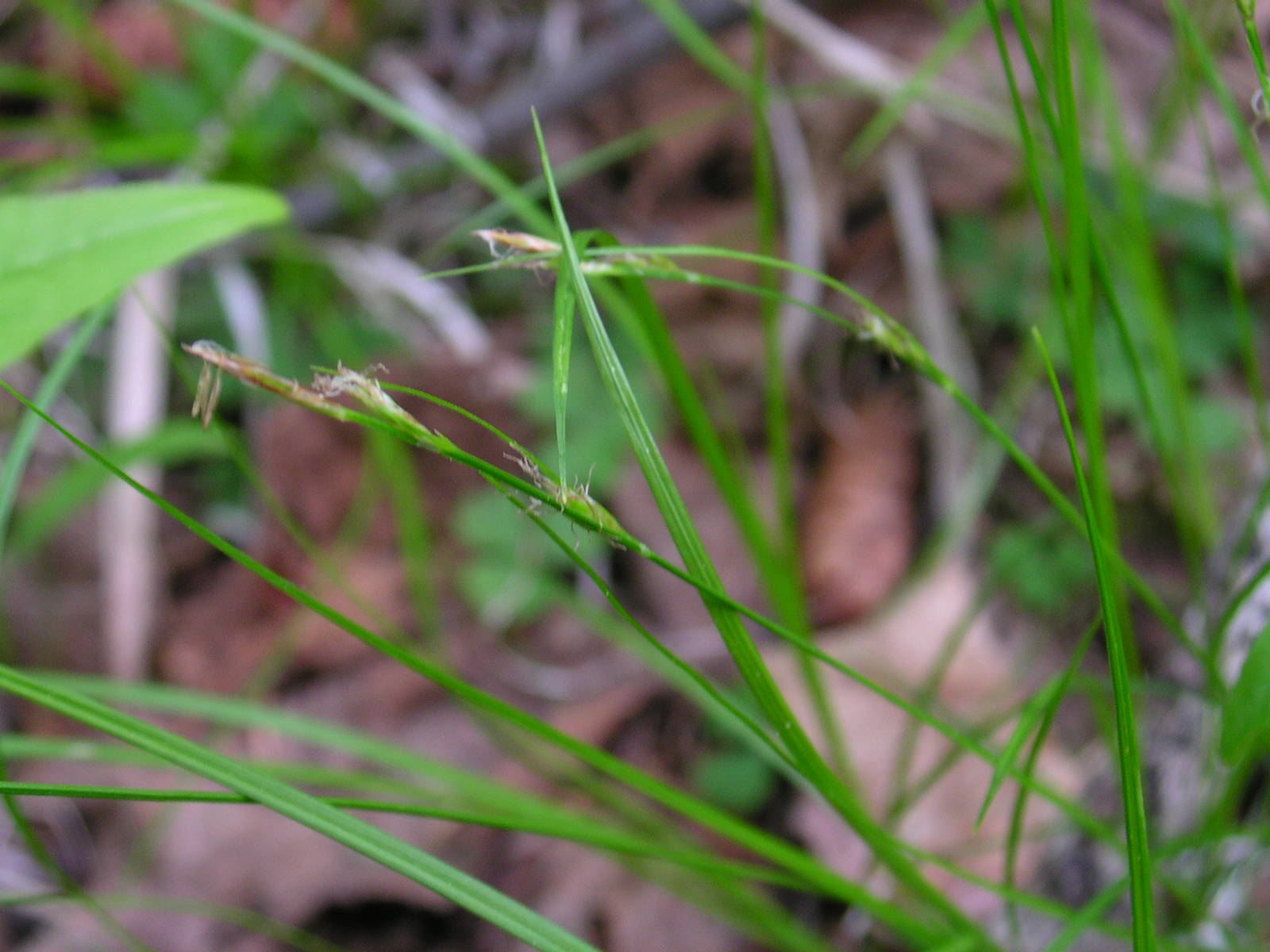

== Habitat and distribution ==
The plant occurs commonly in mesic deciduous forests and less commonly in evergreen-deciduous forests.

It is native to North America, but is more common in Canada and the north-eastern United States than the American Midwest or South.

== Conservation status in the United States ==
It is listed as threatened in Michigan, and Minnesota, and as a species of special concern in Connecticut.
