= Carex bonanzensis =

Scientific classification
- Kingdom: Plantae
- Clade: Tracheophytes
- Clade: Angiosperms
- Clade: Monocots
- Clade: Commelinids
- Order: Poales
- Family: Cyperaceae
- Genus: Carex
- Species: C. bonanzensis

Binomial name
- Carex bonanzensis Britton

Synonyms
- • Carex cajanderi Kük.

Species of grass-like plant

Carex bonanzensis, the Yukon sedge, or the bonanza sedge, is a species of sedge in the family Cyperaceae. It was described by Nathaniel Lord Britton in 1901.

== Description ==
Carex bonanzensis on average reaches a height of 20–50 cm (8–19.5 in), with red tinged-pale brown leaves at 10–25 cm (4–10 in) long. Flowers are a brown-orange color. Fruiting occurs June through August, at semi-freezing temperatures within the Subarctic region, and warmer temperatures within the south.

== Distribution and habitat ==
Carex bonanzensis is native to parts of Siberia and other sections of the Subarctic region, primarily within far north Canada, mid-Russia, and far northeastern Russia. It grows at elevations of 50–900 m, which are referred to as "lowlands".

== Conservation ==
Carex bonanzensis is fairly common throughout its vast range, hence being mostly unscathed by average human and non-human threats. The IUCN Red List has not officially evaluated the species yet, but may do so in the future.

== Uses ==
Carex bonzanensis has no recorded uses, although there may have been native uses before the species initial discovery; most likely being used by Subarctic tribes.
