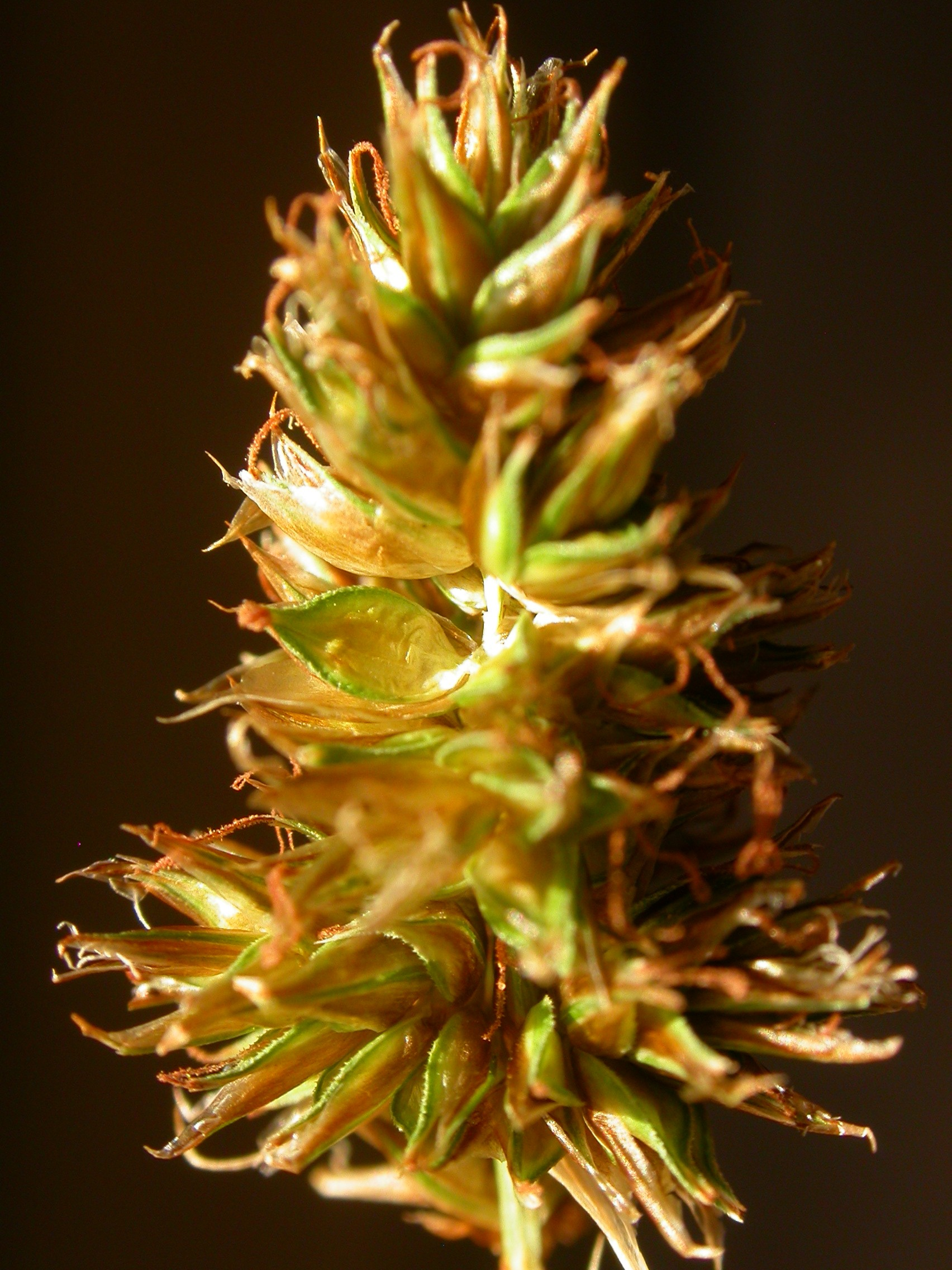

Scientific classification
- Kingdom: Plantae
- Clade: Tracheophytes
- Clade: Angiosperms
- Clade: Monocots
- Clade: Commelinids
- Order: Poales
- Family: Cyperaceae
- Genus: Carex
- Species: C. hoodii

Binomial name
- Carex hoodii Boott

= Carex hoodii =

Species of grass-like plant

Carex hoodii is a species of sedge known by the common name Hood's sedge. It is native to western North America from Alaska to Nunavut to California to South Dakota, where it grows in dry to moist habitat in forests and on mountain slopes.

== Description ==
Carex hoodii produces clumps of very thin stems up to about 80 centimeters in height. The leaves are narrow and possess a tight, green sheath at the base. The inflorescence is a dense cluster of spikelets 1-2 centimeters long. The flowers have reddish scales with light edges. The fruit is coated in a perigynium which is brown in the center and green around the edges, and may have a notched tip.
