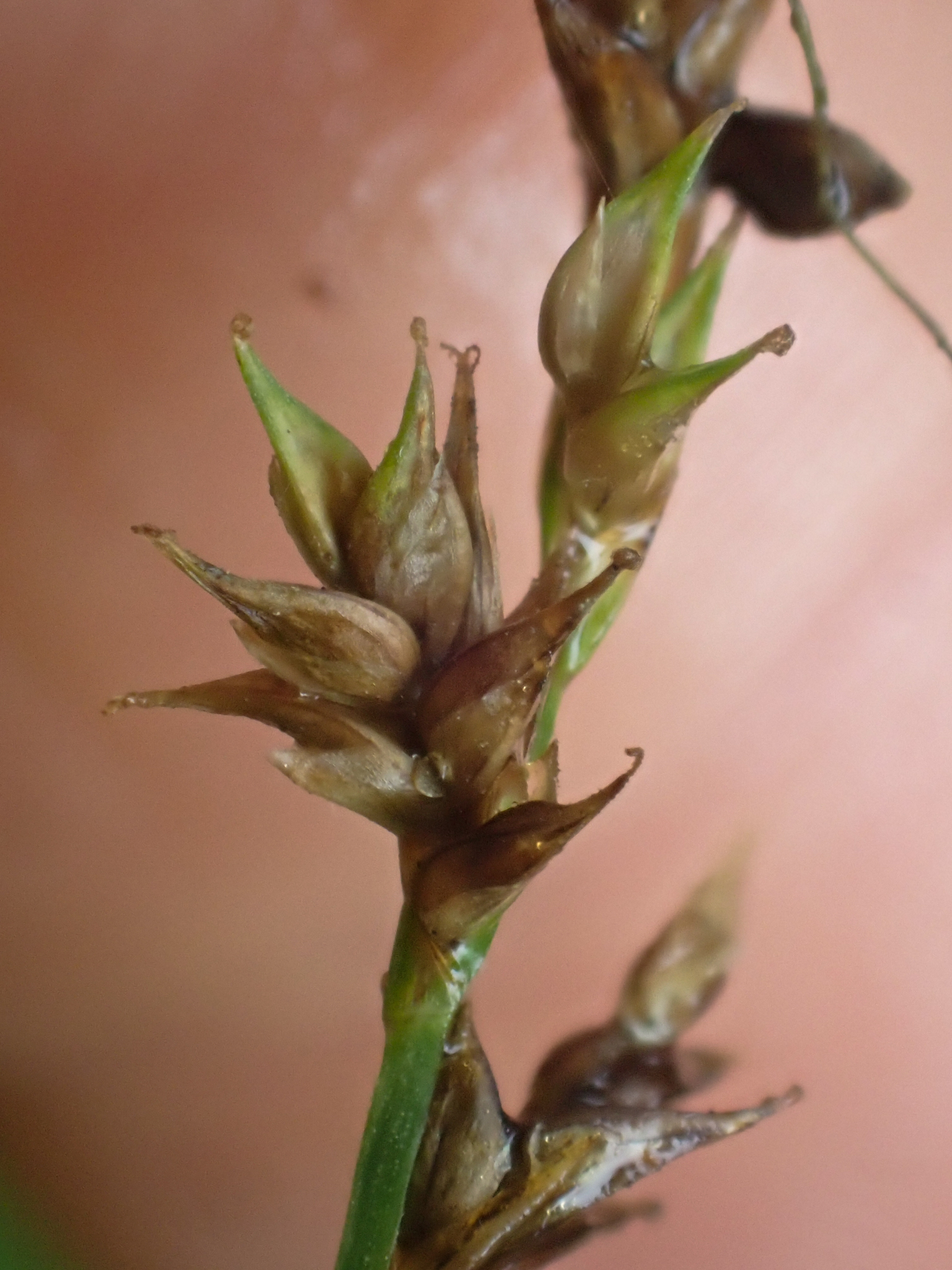

Scientific classification
- Kingdom: Plantae
- Clade: Tracheophytes
- Clade: Angiosperms
- Clade: Monocots
- Clade: Commelinids
- Order: Poales
- Family: Cyperaceae
- Genus: Carex
- Species: C. laeviculmis

Binomial name
- Carex laeviculmis Meinsh.

= Carex laeviculmis =

Species of grass-like plant

Carex laeviculmis, also known as smooth sedge, is a sedge that is native parts of north western United States, western Canada and Alaska.

== See also ==
- List of Carex species
