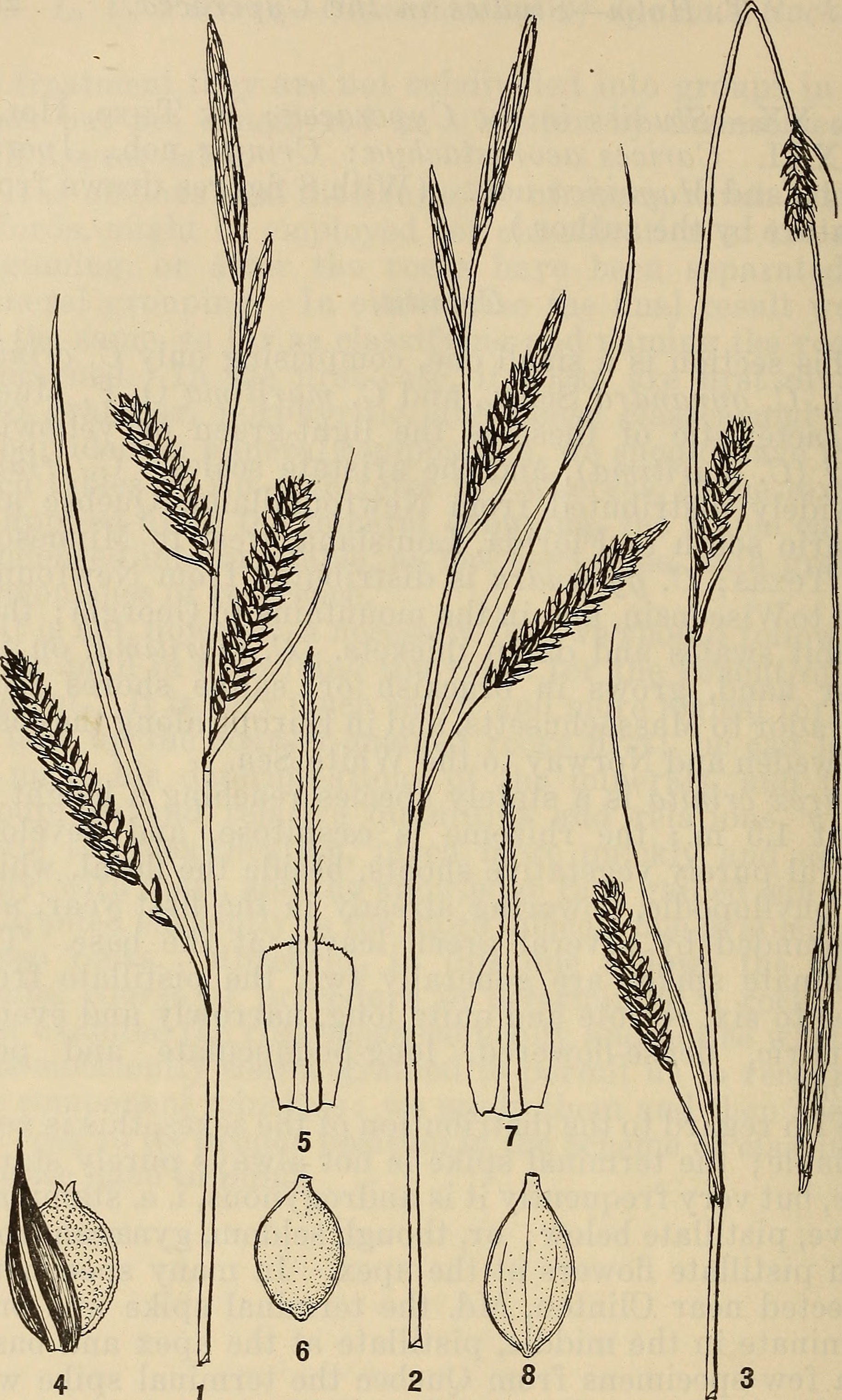
- Figures 1 through 4 depict Carex aperta

Scientific classification
- Kingdom: Plantae
- Clade: Tracheophytes
- Clade: Angiosperms
- Clade: Monocots
- Clade: Commelinids
- Order: Poales
- Family: Cyperaceae
- Genus: Carex
- Species: C. aperta

Binomial name
- Carex aperta Boott

= Carex aperta =

Species of grass-like plant

Carex aperta, known as Columbian sedge, is a species of sedge that was first described by Francis Boott in 1839. It is native to eastern Russia, northern China, western Canada, and the northwestern United States. It grows in wet meadows, along shorelines, and in other wet habitats.
