= List of Minnesota grasses, sedges, and rushes =

This is a list of graminoids (grasses, sedges, and rushes) native or introduced to the U.S. state of Minnesota, organized alphabetically by scientific name (genus and species).

== A ==
- Andropogon gerardi (big bluestem; native)
- Andropogon hallii (sand bluestem; introduced from the central United States)
- Agrostis gigantea (black bentgrass; introduced from Eurasia)
- Agrostis hyemalis (winter bentgrass; native)
- Agrostis scabra (rough bentgrass; native)
- Agrostis perennans (upland bentgrass; native)
- Agrostis stolonifera (creeping bentgrass; introduced from Eurasia)

== B ==
- Bouteloua curtipendula (sideoats grama; native)
- Bouteloua dactyloides (buffalograss; native)
- Bouteloua gracilis (blue grama; native)
- Bouteloua hirsuta (hairy grama; native)
- Bromus arvensis (field brome; introduced from Eurasia)
- Bromus catharticus (rescuegrass; introduced from South America)
- Bromus ciliatus (fringed brome; native)
- Bromus inermis (smooth brome; introduced from Eurasia)
- Bromus kalmii (prairie brome, Kalm's brome; native)
- Bromus latiglumis (early-leaved brome; native)
- Bromus pubescens (hairy woodland brome; native)
- Bromus secalinus (rye brome; introduced from Eurasia)
- Bromus tectorum (cheatgrass; introduced from Eurasia)

== C ==
- Calamagrostis canadensis (marsh reedgrass; native)
- Calamagrostis montanensis (plains reedgrass; native)
- Calamagrostis purpurascens (purple reedgrass; native)
- Calamagrostis stricta (slim-stemmed reedgrass; native)
- Calamovilfa longifolia (sand reedgrass; native)
- Carex adusta (lesser brown sedge; native)
- Carex albicans (white-tinged sedge; native)
- Carex albursina (White Bear sedge; native)
- Carex alopecoidea (foxtail sedge; native)
- Carex annectens (yellow-fruited sedge; native)
- Carex aquatilis (water sedge; native)
- Carex arcta (northern cluster sedge; native)
- Carex arctata (drooping woodland sedge; native)
- Carex assiniboinensis (Assiniboia sedge; native)
- Carex atherodes (wheat sedge; native)
- Carex aurea (golden sedge; native)
- Carex bebbii (Bebb's sedge; native)
- Carex bicknellii (Bicknell's sedge; native)
- Carex blanda (common woodland sedge; native)
- Carex brevior (plains oval sedge; native)
- Carex bromoides (brome-like sedge; native)
- Carex brunnescens (brownish sedge; native)
- Carex buxbaumii (Buxbaum's sedge; native)
- Carex canescens (silvery sedge; native)
- Carex capillaris (hair-like sedge; native)
- Carex careyana (Carey's sedge; native)
- Carex castanea (chestnut sedge; native)
- Carex cephaloidea (thin-leaved sedge; native)
- Carex cephalophora (oval-leaved sedge; native)
- Carex chordorrhiza (creeping sedge; native)
- Carex communis (fibrous-rooted sedge; native)
- Carex comosa (long-haired sedge; native)
- Carex conjuncta (soft fox sedge; native)
- Carex conoidea (openfield sedge; native)
- Carex crinita (fringed sedge; native)
- Carex cristatella (crested sedge; native)
- Carex crus-corvi (raven-footed sedge; native)
- Carex cryptolepis (northeastern sedge; native)
- Carex davisii (Davis's sedge; native)
- Carex debilis (white-edged sedge; native)
- Carex deflexa (northern sedge; native)
- Carex deweyana (Dewey sedge; native)
- Carex diandra (lesser panicled sedge; native)
- Carex disperma (soft-leaved sedge; native)
- Carex duriuscula (needle-leaved sedge; native)
- Carex eburnea (ivory sedge; native)
- Carex echinata (star sedge; native)
- Carex echinodes (native)
- Carex emoryi (Emory's sedge; native)
- Carex exilis (coastal sedge; native)
- Carex festucacea (fescue sedge; native)
- Carex filifolia (thread-leaved sedge; native)
- Carex flava (yellow sedge; native)
- Carex foenea (straw sedge; native)
- Carex formosa (handsome sedge; native)
- Carex garberi (elk sedge; native)
- Carex gracillima (graceful sedge; native)
- Carex granularis (limestone meadow sedge; native)
- Carex gravida (heavy sedge; native)
- Carex grayi (common bur sedge, Gray's sedge; native)
- Carex grisea (inflated narrow-leaved sedge; native)
- Carex gynandra (nodding sedge; native)
- Carex gynocrates (northern bog sedge; native)
- Carex hallii (deer sedge; native)
- Carex haydenii (Hayden's sedge; native)
- Carex hirtifolia (pubescent sedge; native)
- Carex hitchcockiana (Hitchcock's sedge; native)
- Carex hookeriana (Hooker's sedge; native)
- Carex houghtoniana (Houghton's sedge; native)
- Carex hystericina (porcupine sedge; native)
- Carex inops (long-stoloned sedge; native)
- Carex interior (inland sedge; native)
- Carex intumescens (greater bladder sedge; native)
- Carex jamesii (James's sedge; native)
- Carex ×knieskernii (native)
- Carex lacustris (lake sedge; native)
- Carex laeviconica (smooth-coned sedge; native)
- Carex laevivaginata (smooth-sheathed sedge; native)
- Carex lasiocarpa (woolly-fruited sedge; native)
- Carex laxiculmis (spreading sedge; native)
- Carex leptalea (bristly-stalked sedge; native)
- Carex leptonervia (nerveless woodland sedge; native)
- Carex limosa (mud sedge; native)
- Carex livida (livid sedge; native)
- Carex lucorum (Blue Ridge sedge; native)
- Carex lupulina (hop sedge; native)
- Carex lurida (shallow sedge; native)
- Carex magellanica (boreal bog sedge; native)
- Carex meadii (Mead's sedge; native)
- Carex merritt-fernaldii (Fernald's sedge; native)
- Carex michauxiana (Michaux's sedge; native)
- Carex molesta (troublesome sedge; native)
- Carex muehlenbergii (Muhlenberg's sedge; native)
- Carex muskingumensis (palm sedge; native)
- Carex normalis (greater straw sedge; native)
- Carex obtusata (obtuse sedge; native)
- Carex oligocarpa (richwoods sedge; native)
- Carex oligosperma (few-seeded sedge; native)
- Carex ormostachya (necklace spike sedge; native)
- Carex pallescens (pale sedge; native)
- Carex pauciflora (few-flowered sedge; native)
- Carex peckii (Peck's sedge; native)
- Carex pedunculata (long-stalked sedge; native)
- Carex pellita (woolly sedge; native)
- Carex pensylvanica (oak sedge, Pennsylvania sedge; native)
- Carex plantaginea (plantain-leaved sedge; native)
- Carex praegracilis (clustered field sedge; native)
- Carex prairea (prairie sedge; native)
- Carex praticola (meadow sedge; native)
- Carex projecta (necklace sedge; native)
- Carex pseudocyperus (cypress-like sedge; native)
- Carex radiata (eastern star sedge; native)
- Carex retrorsa (knot-sheathed sedge; native)
- Carex richardsonii (Richardson's sedge; native)
- Carex rosea (rosy sedge; native)
- Carex rossii (Ross's sedge; native)
- Carex rostrata (beaked sedge; native)
- Carex sartwellii (Sartwell's sedge; native)
- Carex saximontana (Rocky Mountain sedge; native)
- Carex scirpoidea (northern single-spiked sedge; native)
- Carex scoparia (broom sedge; native)
- Carex siccata (dry-spiked sedge; native)
- Carex sparganioides (bur-reed sedge; native)
- Carex squarrosa (squarrose sedge; native)
- Carex sprengelii (long-beaked sedge, Sprengel's sedge; native)
- Carex sterilis (dioecious sedge; native)
- Carex stipata (awl-fruited sedge; native)
- Carex stricta (upright sedge; native)
- Carex suberecta (prairie straw sedge; native)
- Carex supina (weak Arctic sedge; native)
- Carex sychnocephala (many-headed sedge; native)
- Carex tenera (quill sedge; native)
- Carex tetanica (rigid sedge; native)
- Carex tonsa (shaved sedge; native)
- Carex torreyi (Torrey's sedge; native)
- Carex trichocarpa (hairy-fruited sedge; native)
- Carex trisperma (three-seeded sedge; native)
- Carex tuckermanii (Tuckerman's sedge; native)
- Carex typhina (cattail sedge; native)
- Carex umbellata (parasol sedge; native)
- Carex utriculata (Northwest Territory sedge; native)
- Carex vaginata (sheathed sedge; native)
- Carex vesicaria (blister sedge; native)
- Carex viridula (little green sedge; native)
- Carex vulpinoidea (fox sedge; native)
- Carex woodii (pretty sedge; native)
- Carex xerantica (white-scaled sedge; native)
- Cenchrus longispinus (sandbur; native)
- Cinna arundinacea (stout woodreed, sweet woodreed; native)
- Cinna latifolia (drooping woodreed; native)
- Cladium mariscoides (smooth sawgrass; native)
- Cyperus acuminatus (taper-tipped flatsedge; native)
- Cyperus bipartitus (slender flatsedge; native)
- Cyperus diandrus (umbrella flatsedge; native)
- Cyperus erythrorhizos (red-rooted flatsedge; native)
- Cyperus esculentus (yellow nutsedge; native)
- Cyperus fuscus (brown flatsedge; introduced from Eurasia)
- Cyperus houghtonii (Houghton's flatsedge; native)
- Cyperus lupulinus (Great Plains flatsedge; native)
- Cyperus odoratus (fragrant flatsedge; native)
- Cyperus rotundus (nutgrass; native or introduced from Eurasia)
- Cyperus schweinitzii (Schweinitz's flatsedge; native)
- Cyperus squarrosus (bearded flatsedge; native)
- Cyperus strigosus (straw-colored flatsedge; native)

== D ==
- Danthonia spicata (poverty oatgrass; native)
- Dactylis glomerata (orchard grass; introduced from Eurasia)
- Digitaria ischaemum (smooth crabgrass; introduced from Eurasia)
- Digitaria sanguinalis (hairy crabgrass; introduced from Europe)

== E ==
- Elymus canadensis (Canada wild rye; native)
- Elymus hystrix (bottlebrush grass; native)
- Elymus repens (quackgrass; introduced from Eurasia)
- Eragrostis cilianensis (stink grass; introduced from Europe)
- Eragrostis spectabilis (purple lovegrass; native)

== H ==
- Hesperostipa comata (needle-and-thread grass; native)
- Hesperostipa spartea (porcupine grass; native)
- Hordeum jubatum (foxtail barley; native)
- Hordeum pusillum (little barley; native)
- Hordeum vulgare (barley; introduced from Eurasia)

== J ==
- Juncus canadensis (Canada rush; native)
- Juncus tenuis (path rush; native)

== K ==
- Koeleria macrantha (junegrass; native)

== L ==
- Luzula acuminata (hairy woodrush; native)
- Luzula multiflora (common woodrush; native)
- Luzula parviflora (small-flowered woodrush; native)

== M ==
- Muhlenbergia asperifolia (alkali muhly, scratchgrass; native)
- Muhlenbergia cuspidata (plains muhly, prairie satingrass; native)
- Muhlenbergia frondosa (wire-stemmed muhly, common satingrass; native)
- Muhlenbergia glomerata (spiked muhly, marsh muhly; native)
- Muhlenbergia mexicana (Mexican muhly, leafy satingrass, wirestem muhly; native)
- Muhlenbergia racemosa (marsh muhly; native)
- Muhlenbergia richardsonis (mat muhly; native)
- Muhlenbergia schreberi (nimblewill; native)
- Muhlenbergia sylvatica (woodland muhly; native)
- Muhlenbergia uniflora (bog muhly; native)

== P ==
- Panicum capillare (witchgrass; native)
- Panicum dichotomiflorum (fall panicgrass; native)
- Panicum miliaceum (proso millet; introduced from Asia)
- Panicum philadelphicum (Philadelphia panicgrass; native)
- Panicum virgatum (switchgrass; native)
- Paspalum setaceum (thin paspalum; native)
- Phalaris arundinacea (reed canarygrass; native and introduced)

== S ==
- Schizachyrium scoparium (little bluestem; native)
- Sorghastrum nutans (indiangrass; native)
- Spartina pectinata (prairie cordgrass; native)
- Sporobolus compositus (tall dropseed; native)
- Sporobolus cryptandrus (sand dropseed; native)
- Sporobolus heterolepis (prairie dropseed; native)
- Sporobolus neglectus (small dropseed; native)
- Sporobolus vaginiflorus (sheathed dropseed; native)

== T ==
- Triplasis purpurea (sand grass; native)
- Tripsacum dactyloides (gama grass; native)

== Z ==
- Zizania aquatica (wild rice; native)
- Zizania palustris (northern wild rice; native)
