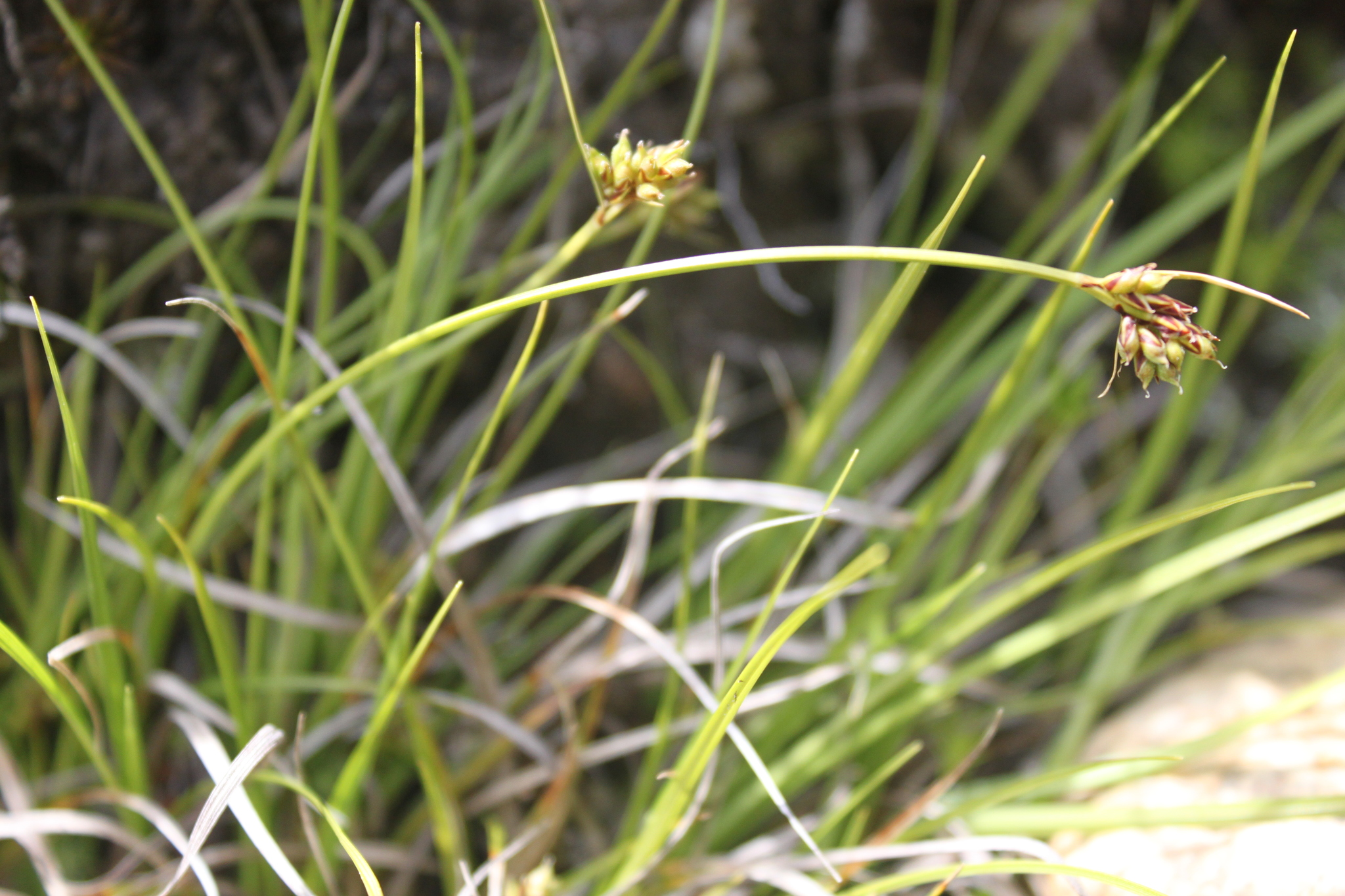

Scientific classification
- Kingdom: Plantae
- Clade: Tracheophytes
- Clade: Angiosperms
- Clade: Monocots
- Clade: Commelinids
- Order: Poales
- Family: Cyperaceae
- Genus: Carex
- Species: C. deflexa

Binomial name
- Carex deflexa Hornem.

Synonyms
- Carex novae-angliae var. deflexa (Hornem.) L.H.Bailey; Carex pilulifera var. deflexa (Hornem.) Drejer

= Carex deflexa =

Species of grass-like plant

Carex deflexa, the northern sedge, is a cespitose sedge with purplish brown to reddish brown rhizomes and pale green leafs that are often shorter than stems and 0.9–2.6 mm wide.

It is native to Canada, most of the US except the central states, and Greenland.
