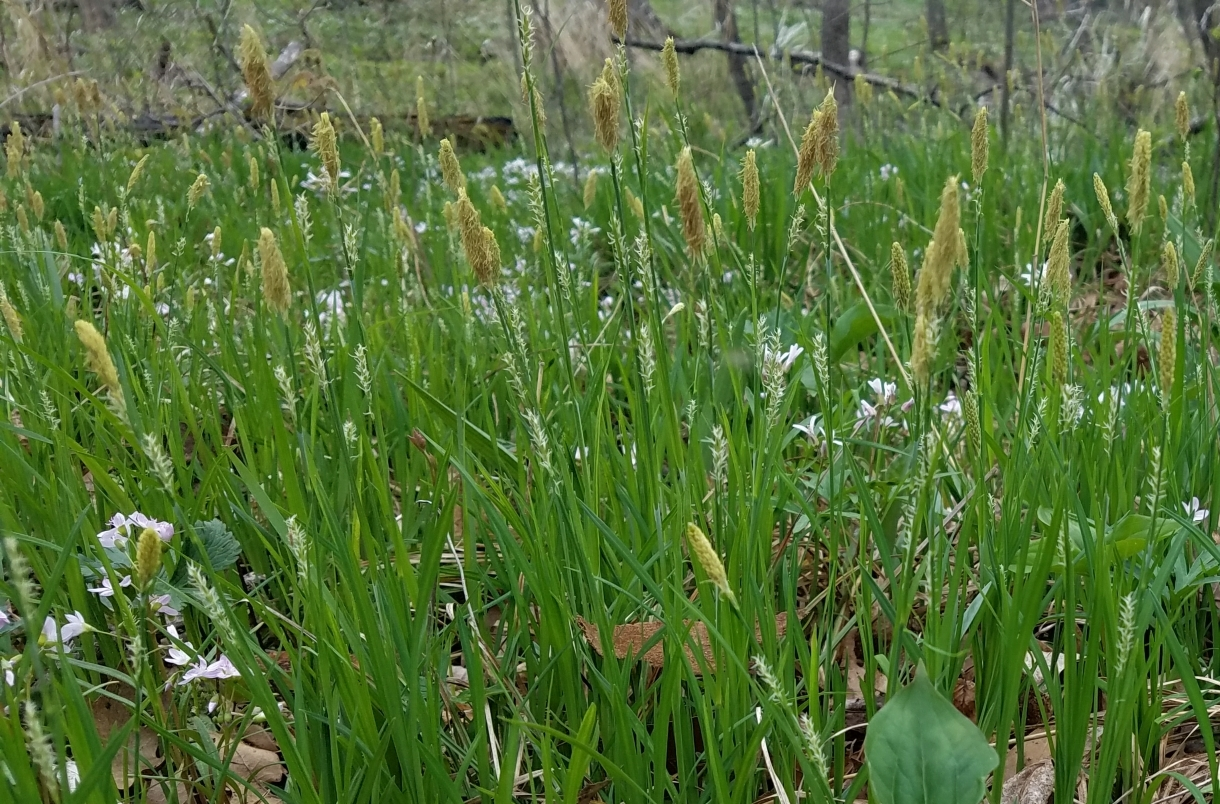

Scientific classification
- Kingdom: Plantae
- Clade: Tracheophytes
- Clade: Angiosperms
- Clade: Monocots
- Clade: Commelinids
- Order: Poales
- Family: Cyperaceae
- Genus: Carex
- Subgenus: Carex subg. Carex
- Section: Carex sect. Paniceae
- Species: C. woodii

Binomial name
- Carex woodii Dewey, 1846

= Carex woodii =

Species of grass-like plant

Carex woodii, known as pretty sedge, is a species of sedge native to North America.

== Description ==
Carex woodii is a rhizomatous sedge, forming loose clumps to large vegetative colonies. The leaf sheathes are tinged with reddish-purple. Compared to most other Carex across its range, it flowers and fruits earlier in the year. In Michigan it fruits by mid-May or earlier.

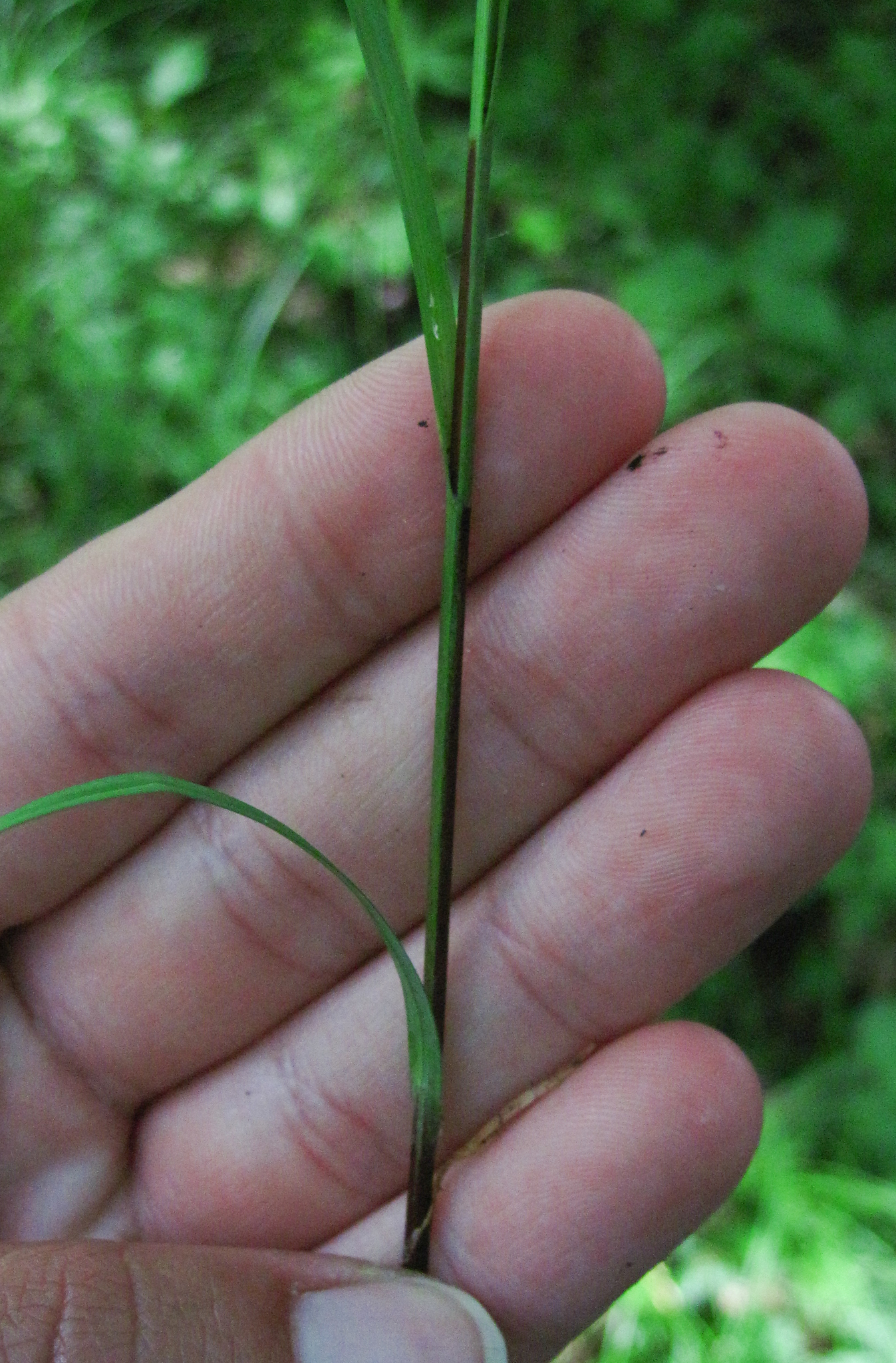
Purple sheath of Carex woodii

== Distribution and habitat ==
Carex woodii is native to the Midwestern and Eastern United States and Ontario. It is found in both moist and dry woodlands. It is considered a rare plant of concern in the Chicago region and Connecticut.
