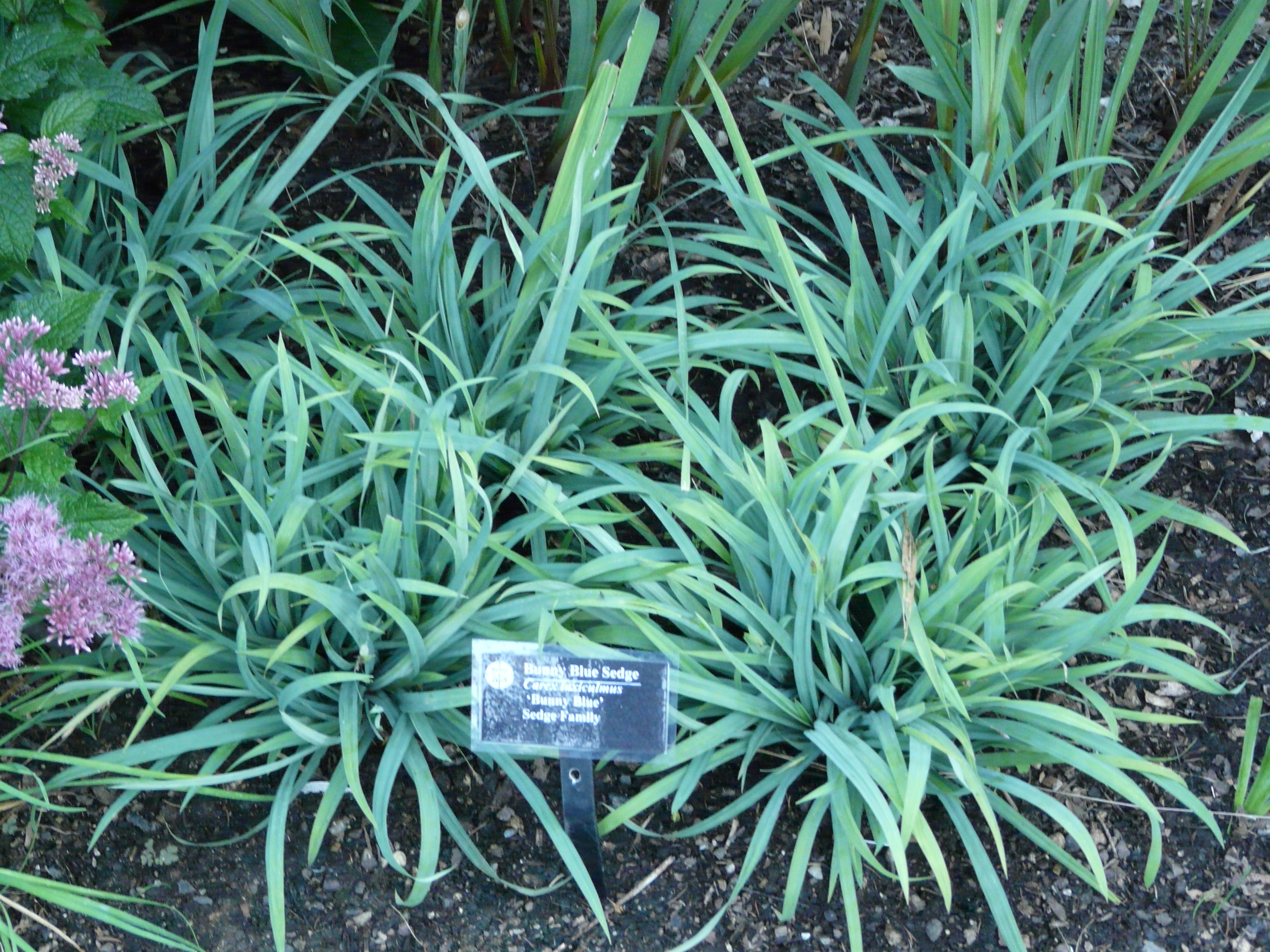
- 'Hobb' cultivar, trade name Bunny Blue
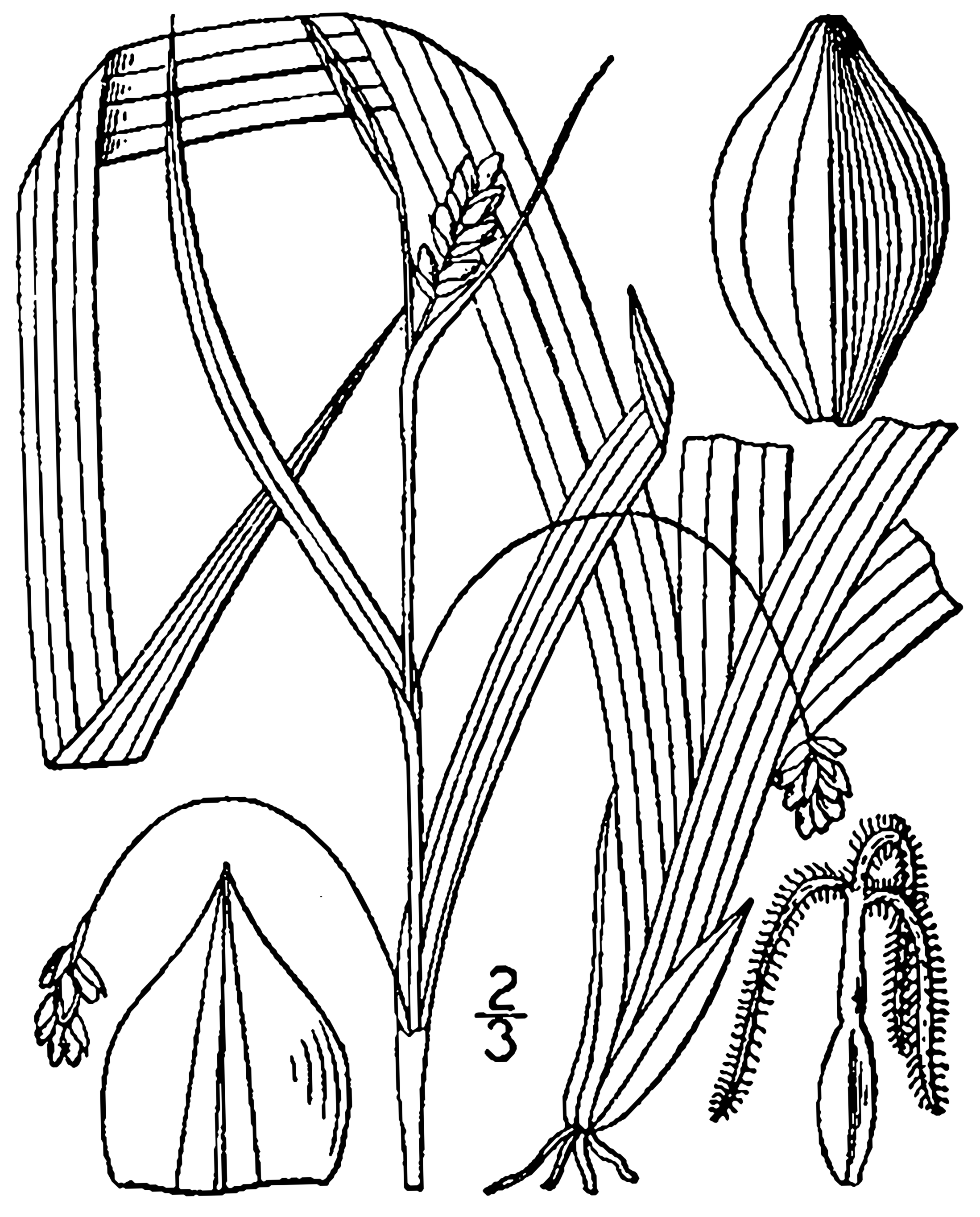
- Botanical illustration

Scientific classification
- Kingdom: Plantae
- Clade: Tracheophytes
- Clade: Angiosperms
- Clade: Monocots
- Clade: Commelinids
- Order: Poales
- Family: Cyperaceae
- Genus: Carex
- Species: C. laxiculmis

Binomial name
- Carex laxiculmis Schwein.

Synonyms
- List: Carex absconditiformis Fernald; Carex copulata (L.H.Bailey) Mack.; Carex digitalis var. copulata (L.H.Bailey) L.H.Bailey; Carex laxiculmis f. serotina Howe; Carex retrocurva Dewey; Carex retrocurva var. copulata L.H.Bailey

= Carex laxiculmis =

Species of grass-like plant

Carex laxiculmis, the creeping sedge, is a species of flowering plant in the family Cyperaceae, native to Ontario, Canada, and the central and eastern United States. As with most species of sedge, it prefers to grow in shady, wet areas. Its cultivar 'Hobb', sold under the trade designation Bunny Blue, is available from commercial nurseries.

== Subtaxa ==
The following varieties are currently accepted:

- Carex laxiculmis var. copulata (L.H.Bailey) Fernald – central part of range, and Minnesota, and introduced to New York
- Carex laxiculmis var. laxiculmis – entire range, except Minnesota
