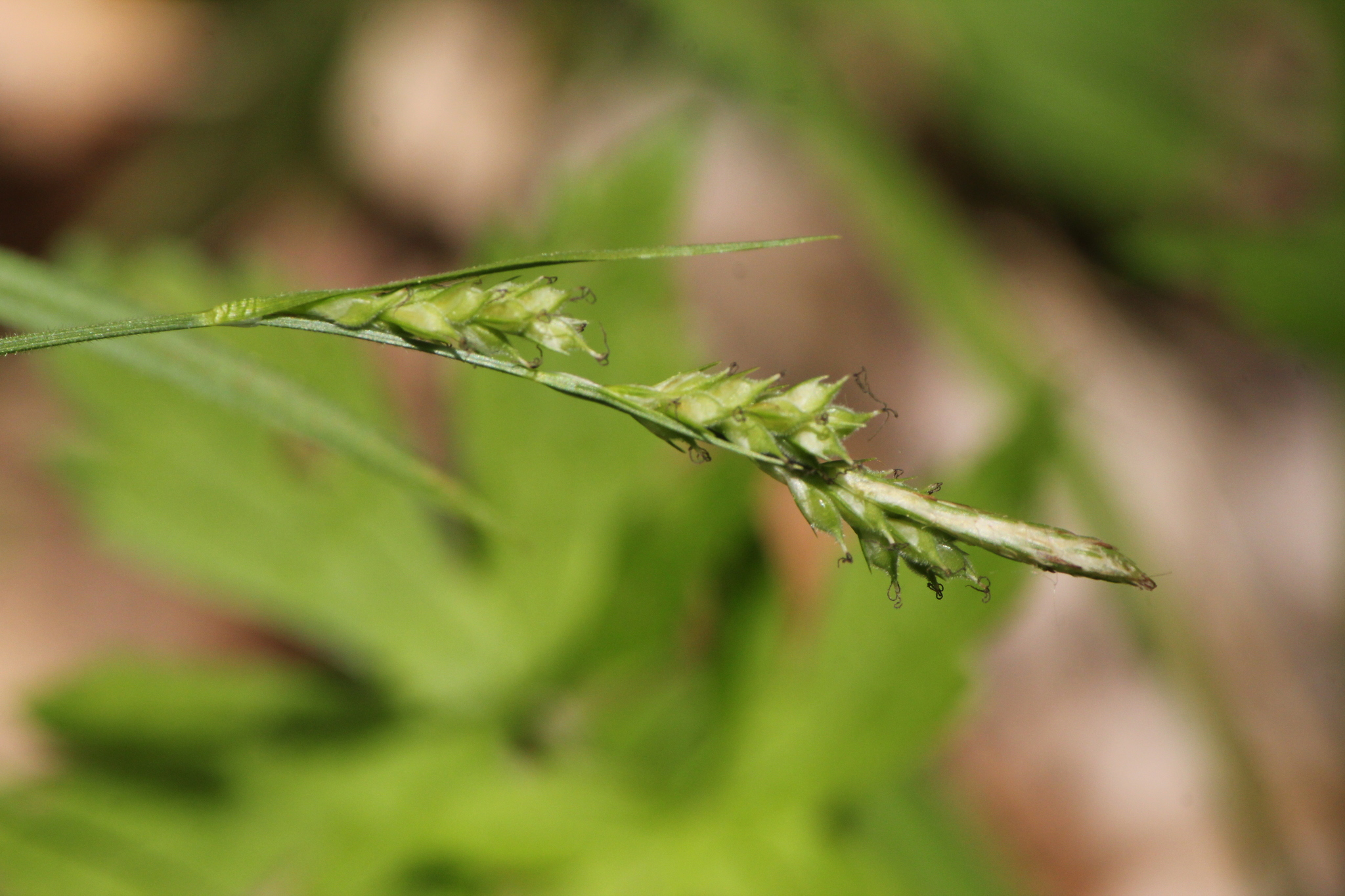
- Carex hirtifolia

Scientific classification
- Kingdom: Plantae
- Clade: Tracheophytes
- Clade: Angiosperms
- Clade: Monocots
- Clade: Commelinids
- Order: Poales
- Family: Cyperaceae
- Genus: Carex
- Subgenus: Carex subg. Carex
- Section: Carex sect. Hirtifoliae; Reznicek
- Species: C. hirtifolia

Binomial name
- Carex hirtifolia Mack.

Synonyms
- Carex pubescens Muhl. ex Willd., non Poir.

= Carex hirtifolia =

Species of grass-like plant

Carex hirtifolia, the pubescent sedge, is a species of sedge native to northeastern North America. It is the only species in Carex section Hirtifoliae. The entire plant is distinctively covered soft hairs.

== Description ==
Plants of C. hirtifolia are shortly rhizomatous, forming loose tufts. The leaves are M-shaped in cross-section, and no more than 8 millimetres (0.3 in) wide. The inflorescences comprise 2–5 spikes, the last of which is staminate (male), the others being pistillate (female) and born on stalks less than 10 mm (0.4 in) long. The utricles are less than 10 mm (0.39 in) long, with a beak 0.7–1.5 mm (0.03–0.06 in) long.
