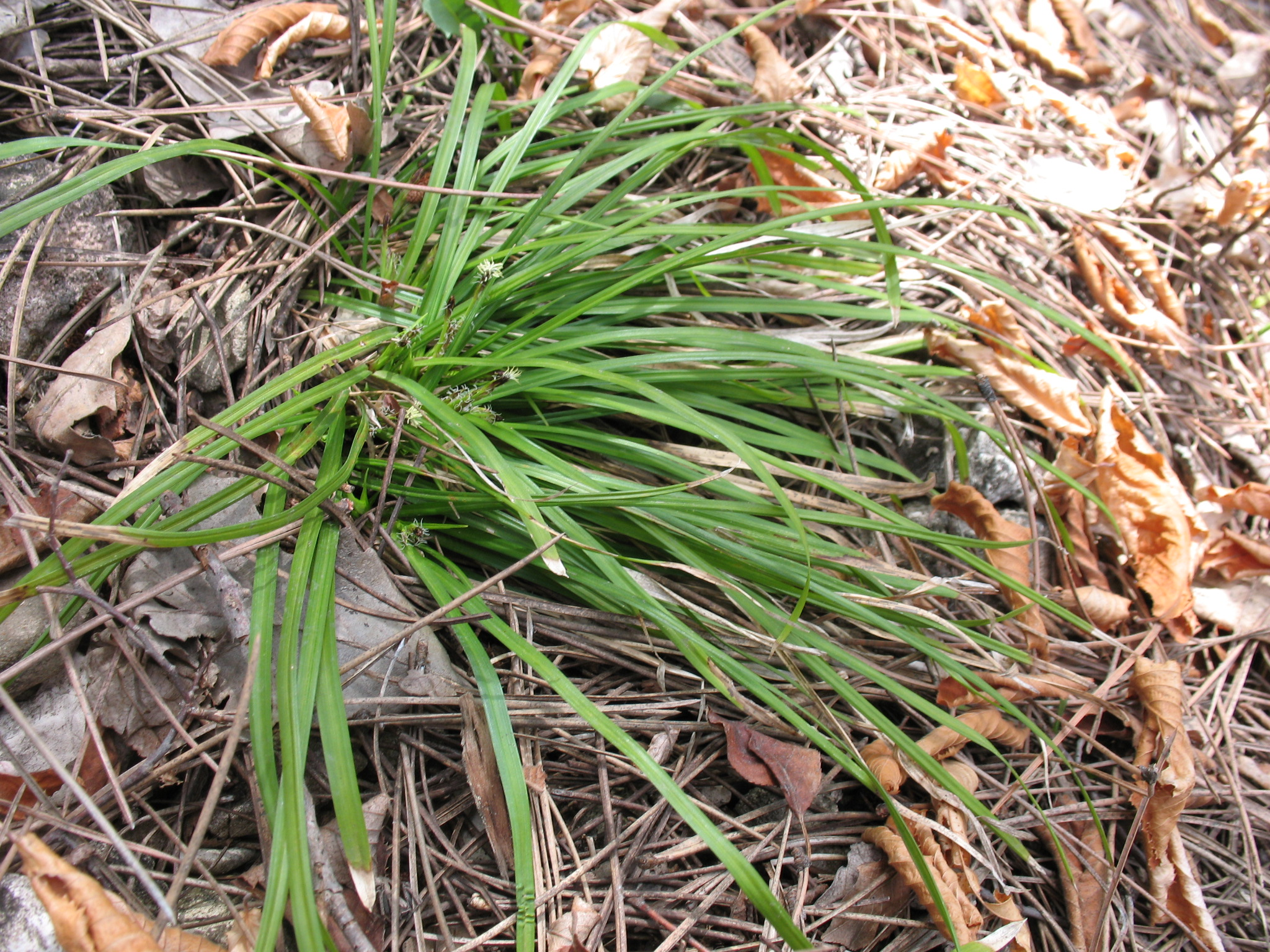
- Habitus

Conservation status
- Least Concern (IUCN 3.1)

Scientific classification
- Kingdom: Plantae
- Clade: Tracheophytes
- Clade: Angiosperms
- Clade: Monocots
- Clade: Commelinids
- Order: Poales
- Family: Cyperaceae
- Genus: Carex
- Species: C. pedunculata

Binomial name
- Carex pedunculata Muhl. ex Willd.

= Carex pedunculata =

Species of flowering plant in the sedge family

Carex pedunculata, the long-stalk sedge or longstalk sedge, is a species of flowering plant in the genus Carex, native to Canada and the central and eastern United States. Its seeds are dispersed by ants.

== Description ==
Leaves are dark green, with leaf blades measuring up to 1mm in width. The lowest bract has a leaf sheath measuring about 4mm in length, which is tinted pink or purple. The perigynium is hairy, and measures 3.7–6 mm. The inflorescence is a spike.

== Distribution and habitat. ==
Carex pedunculata mostly thrives in woodlands and flood plains.It is an early coloniser of woodland openings, though its dominance is likely to decrease as competition from other plants increases.
