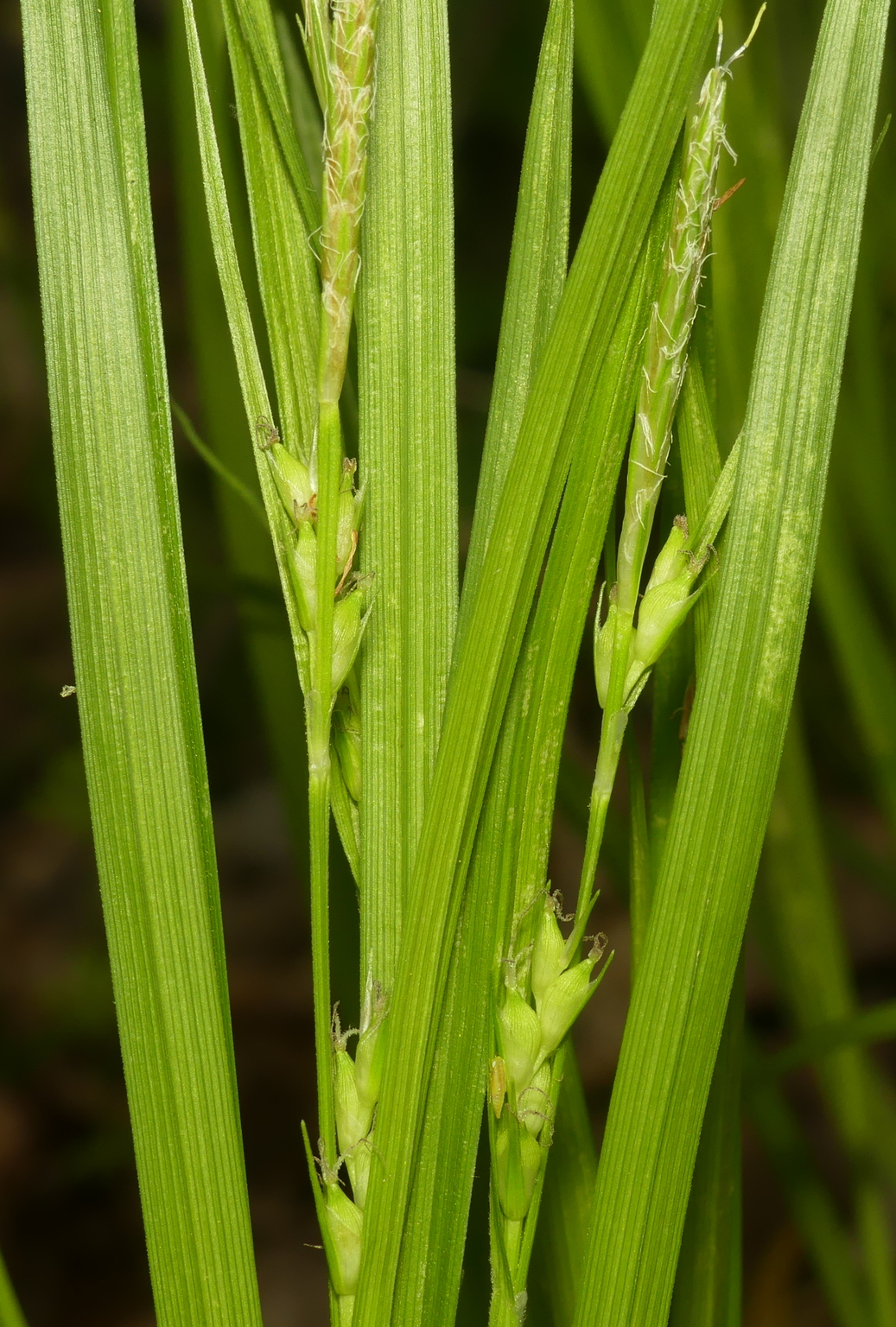

Scientific classification
- Kingdom: Plantae
- Clade: Tracheophytes
- Clade: Angiosperms
- Clade: Monocots
- Clade: Commelinids
- Order: Poales
- Family: Cyperaceae
- Genus: Carex
- Species: C. hitchcockiana

Binomial name
- Carex hitchcockiana Dewey

= Carex hitchcockiana =

Species of grass-like plant

Carex hitchcockiana, common name Hitchcock's sedge, is a Carex species that is native to North America. It is listed as endangered in Maryland, as threatened in New York and Tennessee, and as a species of special concern in Connecticut and Massachusetts.
