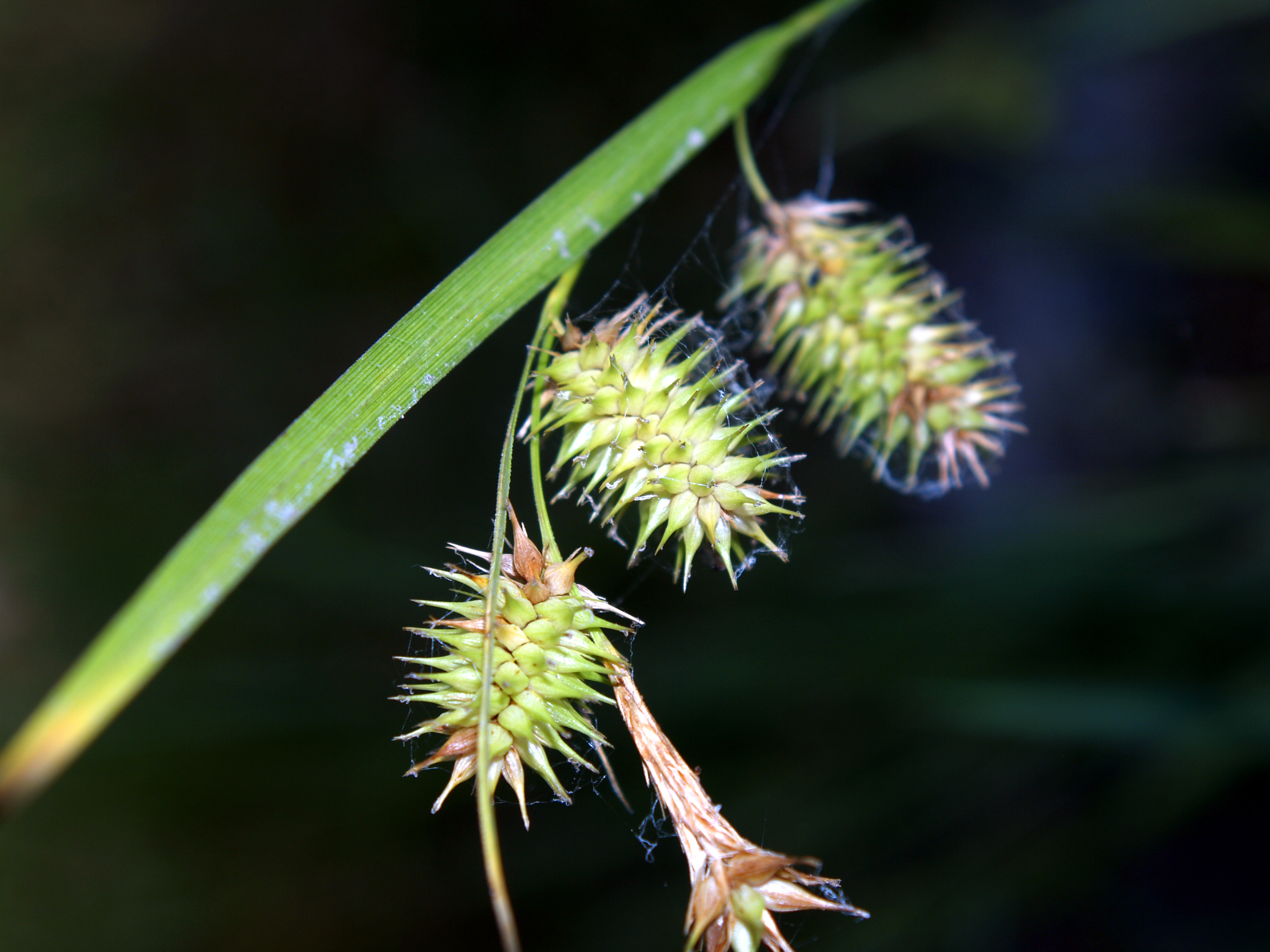

Conservation status
- Least Concern (IUCN 3.1)

Scientific classification
- Kingdom: Plantae
- Clade: Tracheophytes
- Clade: Angiosperms
- Clade: Monocots
- Clade: Commelinids
- Order: Poales
- Family: Cyperaceae
- Genus: Carex
- Species: C. hystericina

Binomial name
- Carex hystericina Muhl. ex Willd.

Synonyms
- List: Carex cooleyi Dewey; Carex erinacea Muhl. ex Steud.; Carex georgiana Dewey ex Steud.; Carex hystericina var. angustior L.H.Bailey; Carex hystericina var. cooleyi (Dewey) Dewey; Carex hystericina var. dudleyi L.H.Bailey; Carex hystericina f. dudleyi (L.H.Bailey) Wiegand

= Carex hystericina =

Species of plant in the sedge family

Carex hystericina is a species of sedge known by the common names bottlebrush sedge and porcupine sedge. It is native to North America and Canada through to Mexico and Jamaica.

== Description ==
This sedge produces dense or loose clumps of triangular stems up to a meter tall from short rhizomes. Leaves are green, basal and alternate, sometimes surpassing the stems in height. Basal leaves are fibrous and purplish in colour. The inflorescence is several centimeters long and is accompanied by a bract which is longer than the spikes. There are separate staminate (male) and pistillate (female) spikes on the same plant. The fruits are coated in perigynia with pointed, toothed tips.

== Distribution and habitat ==
Carex hystericina grows in wet habitat such as wetlands and riverbanks, especially on calcareous soils.
