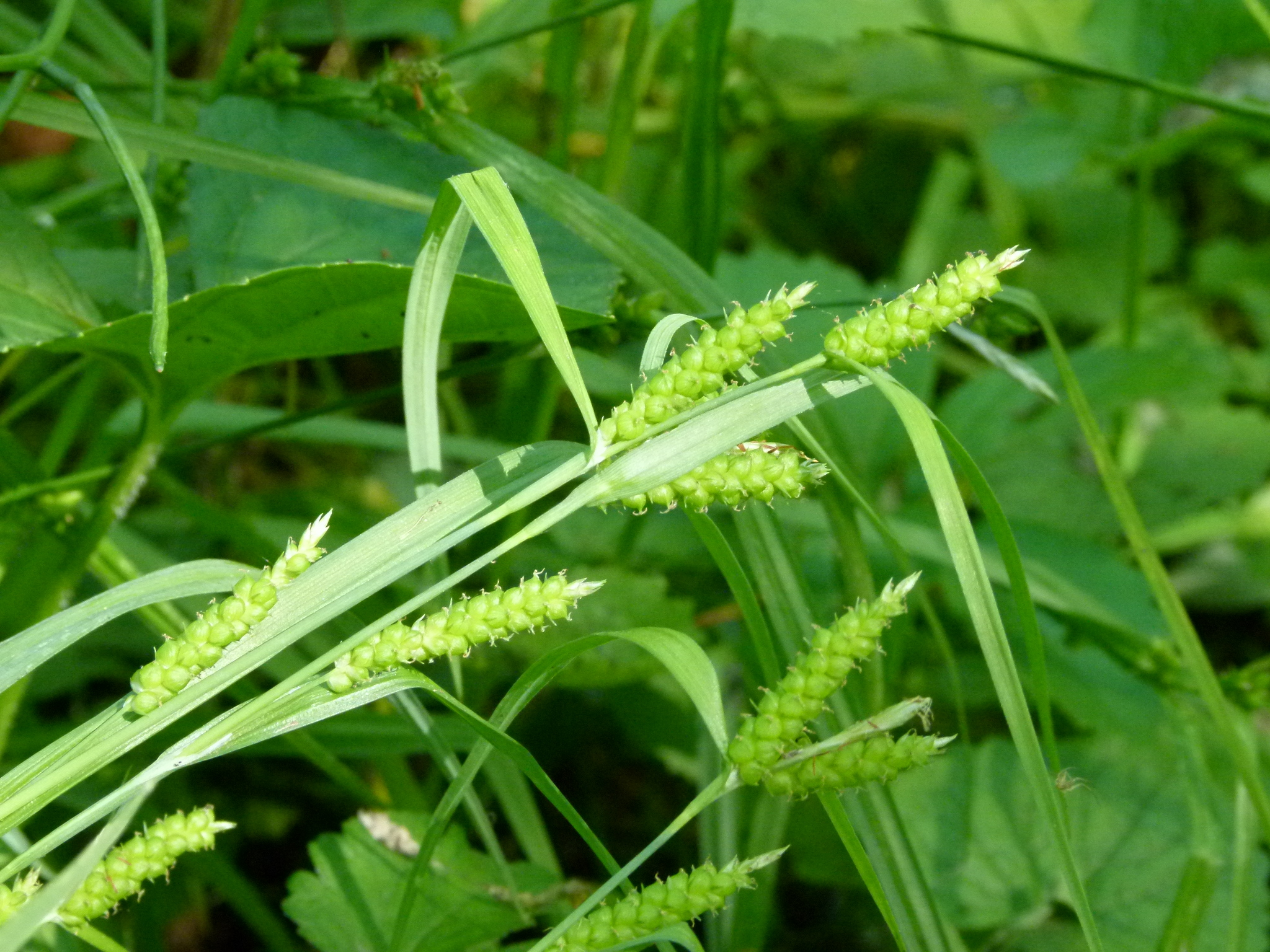
- At the Conococheague Institute, Pennsylvania

Conservation status
- Least Concern (IUCN 3.1)

Scientific classification
- Kingdom: Plantae
- Clade: Tracheophytes
- Clade: Angiosperms
- Clade: Monocots
- Clade: Commelinids
- Order: Poales
- Family: Cyperaceae
- Genus: Carex
- Species: C. granularis

Binomial name
- Carex granularis Muhl. ex Willd.

Synonyms
- List: Carex chalaros Steud.; Carex granularis var. haleana (Olney) Porter; Carex granularis var. shriveri Britton; Carex haleana Olney; Carex rectior Mack.; Carex shriveri (Britton) Britton; Deweya granularis (Muhl. ex Willd.) Raf.

= Carex granularis =

Species of grass-like plant

Carex granularis, the limestone meadow sedge, is a widespread species of flowering plant in the family Cyperaceae, native to Canada and the United States east of the Rockies. As its common name suggests, it prefers wet areas and can tolerate alkaline conditions.
