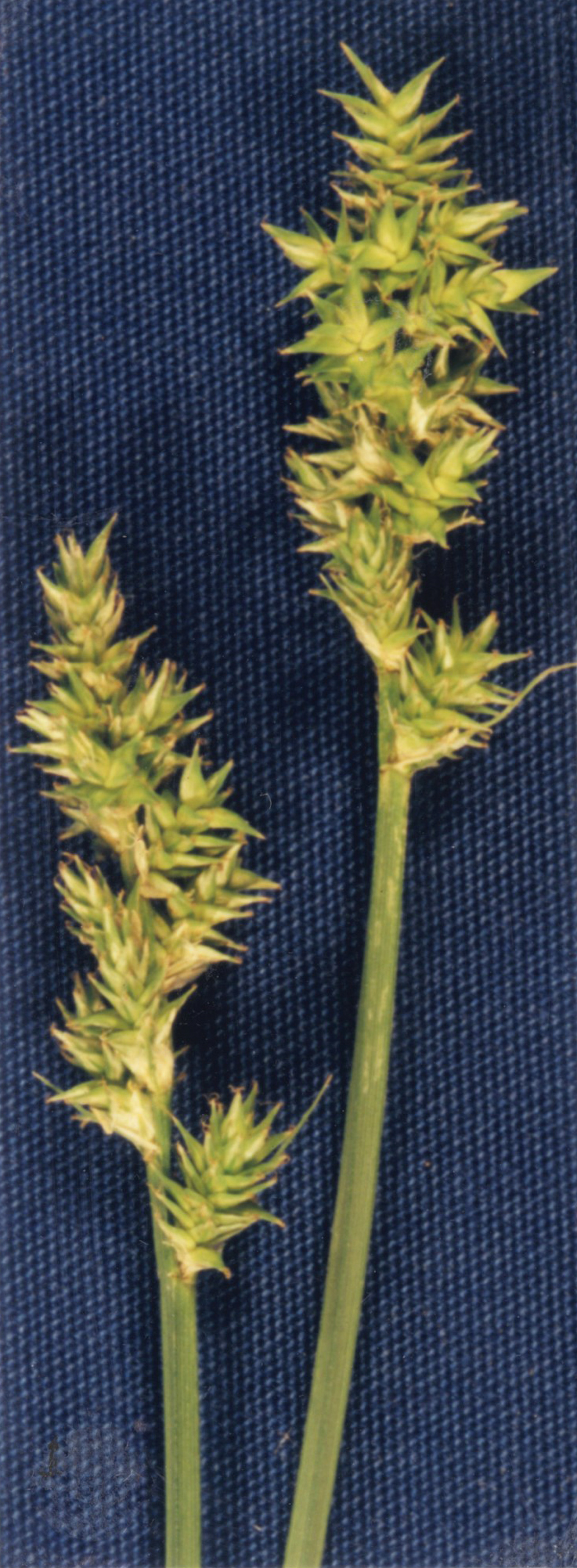

Conservation status
- Least Concern (IUCN 3.1)

Scientific classification
- Kingdom: Plantae
- Clade: Tracheophytes
- Clade: Angiosperms
- Clade: Monocots
- Clade: Commelinids
- Order: Poales
- Family: Cyperaceae
- Genus: Carex
- Subgenus: Carex subg. Vignea
- Section: Carex sect. Glareosae
- Species: C. arcta

Binomial name
- Carex arcta Boott

= Carex arcta =

Species of grass-like plant

Carex arcta is a species of sedge known by the common name northern cluster sedge. It is native to northern North America including most of Canada and northern parts of the United States. It grows in wet areas, especially in coniferous forests. This sedge produces dense clumps of erect stems up to about 80 centimetres (31 in) high. The leaves are pale green to grayish, flat, and have reddish or purple-dotted sheaths at the base, and they are sometimes longer than the stems. The inflorescence is a dense, oblong cluster of up to 15 spikes of pointed flowers, each cluster up to 3–4 cm (1.2–1.6 in) long and each individual spike up to 1 cm (0.39 in) long. The fruit is covered in a sac called a perigynium which is greenish and veined with a reddish tip.
