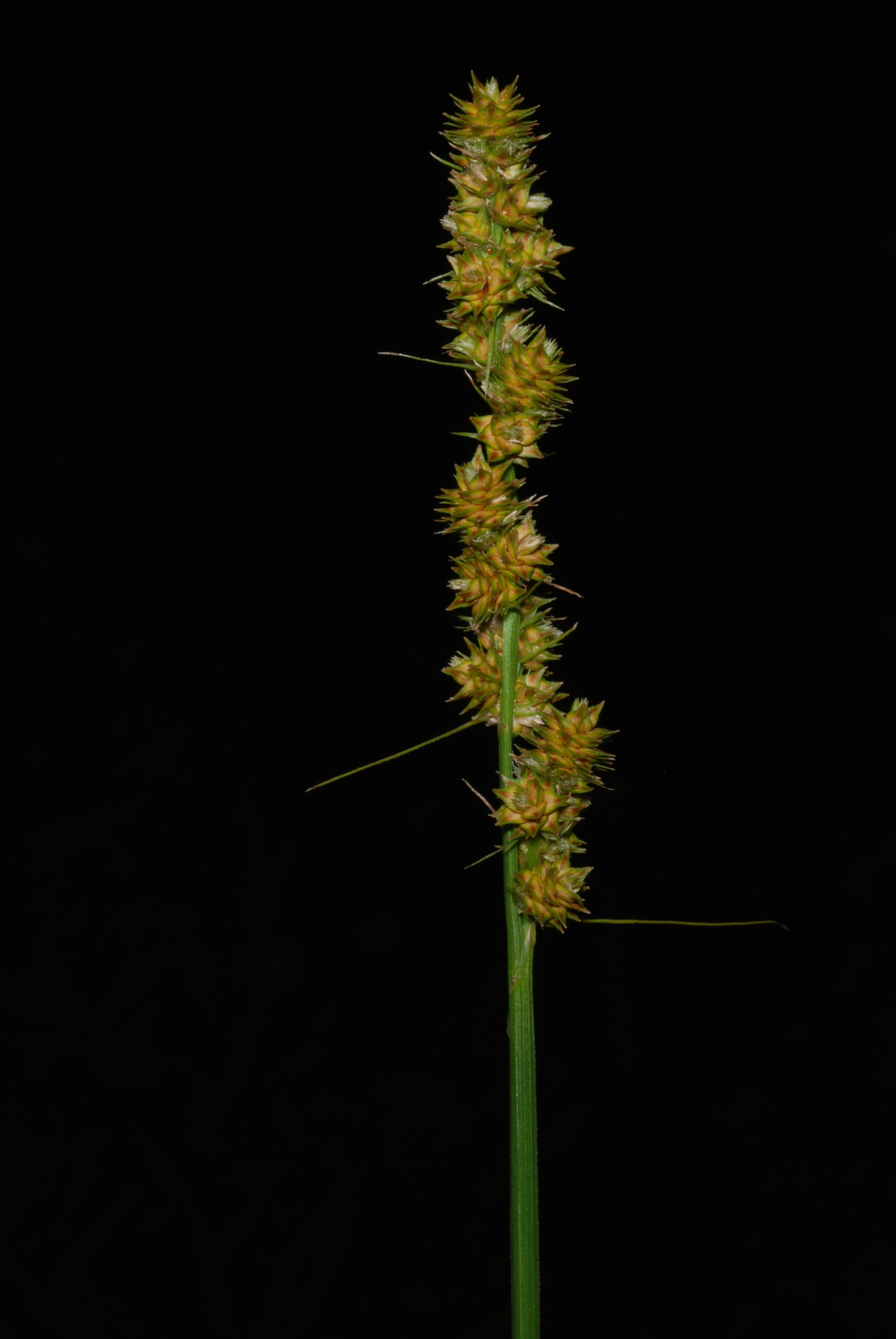

Scientific classification
- Kingdom: Plantae
- Clade: Tracheophytes
- Clade: Angiosperms
- Clade: Monocots
- Clade: Commelinids
- Order: Poales
- Family: Cyperaceae
- Genus: Carex
- Section: Carex sect. Multiflorae
- Species: C. annectens

Binomial name
- Carex annectens (E.P.Bicknell) E.P.Bicknell

Synonyms
- List: Carex annectens var. ambigua (Barratt) Gleason; Carex annectens var. xanthocarpa (Kük.) Wiegand; Carex bicknellii E.G.Camus; Carex brachyglossa Mack.; Carex setacea var. ambigua ( Barratt) Fernald; Carex vulpinoidea var. ambigua Barratt; Carex vulpinoidea f. annectens (E.P.Bicknell) Kük.; Carex vulpinoidea var. annectens (E.P.Bicknell) Farw.; Carex vulpinoidea var. xanthocarpa Kük.; Carex xanthocarpa E.P.Bicknell; Carex xanthocarpa var. annectens E.P.Bicknell

= Carex annectens =

Species of grass-like plant

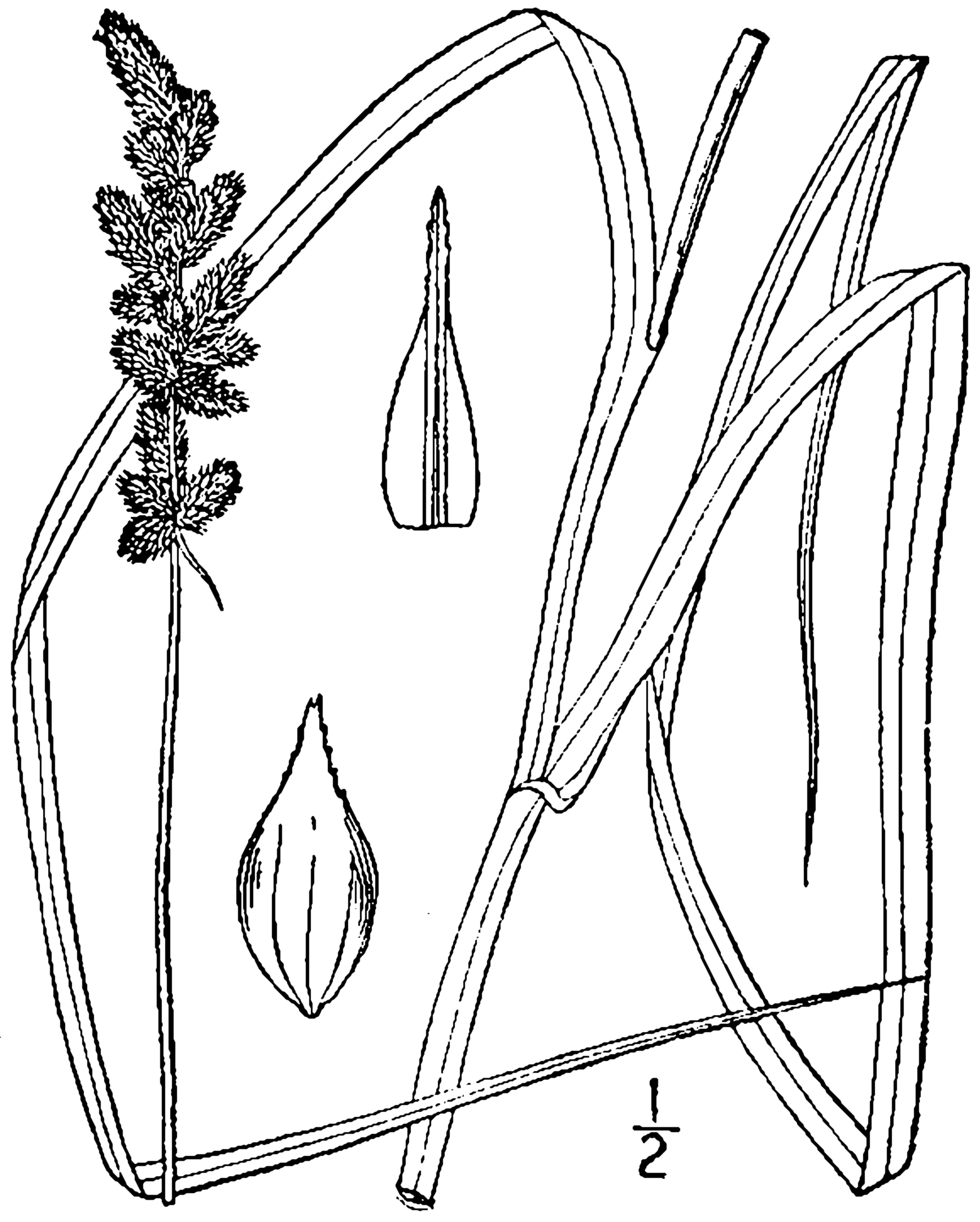
Carex annectens

Carex annectens, sometimes called yellow-fruited fox sedge, is a species of sedge native to most of the eastern United States and southeastern Canada. It is common in prairies and high-water table fallow fields. In the Chicago area, its coefficient of conservatism is 3 (out of 10), and in Michigan, it is only 1, indicating its relatively low fidelity to high quality habitats.

== Description ==
It is often confused with Carex vulpinoidea. It can be distinguished from C. vulpinoidea by its longer leaves (exceeding the height of the flowering stems), the more elongated perigynia, and the longer flowering spikes (often more than 5.5 cm long). Like many sedges, the perigynia of Carex annectens begin to ripen in June.

== Taxonomy ==
It was first formally described as Carex xanthocarpa var. annectens in 1896 by American botanist Eugene P. Bicknell.

Two varieties are sometimes accepted:

- C. annectens var. annectens – large-seeded fox sedge
- C. annectens var. xanthocarpa – small-seeded fox sedge
