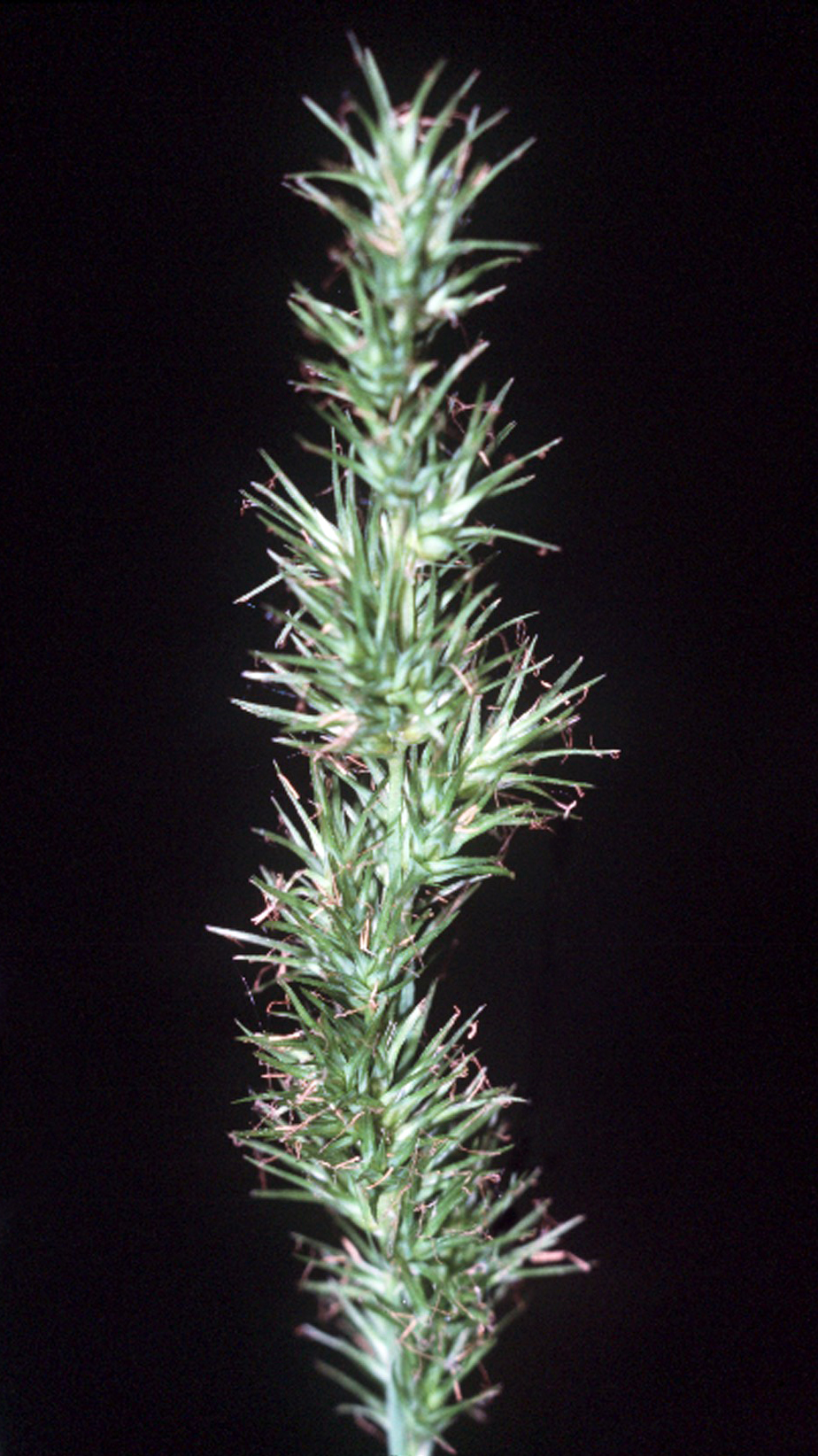
- Spikes

Scientific classification
- Kingdom: Plantae
- Clade: Tracheophytes
- Clade: Angiosperms
- Clade: Monocots
- Clade: Commelinids
- Order: Poales
- Family: Cyperaceae
- Genus: Carex
- Species: C. crus-corvi

Binomial name
- Carex crus-corvi Shuttlew. ex Kunze

Synonyms
- List: Carex bayardii Fernald; Carex crus-corvi f. orthoclados Kunze; Carex crus-corvi var. virginiana Fernald; Carex halei Dewey; Carex hystrix A.Gray ex Boott; Carex ornithorhyncha Boott; Carex siciformis Boott; Carex virginiana (Fernald) Fernald

= Carex crus-corvi =

Species of plant

Carex crus-corvi, the raven's foot sedge or crowfoot sedge, is a species of flowering plant in the family Cyperaceae. It is native to southern Ontario in Canada, and the central and southeastern United States, and it has been introduced to Belgium. A perennial reaching 90 cm (3 ft) and hardy to USDA zone 4, it is an obligate wetland species found in a wide variety of such habitats.
