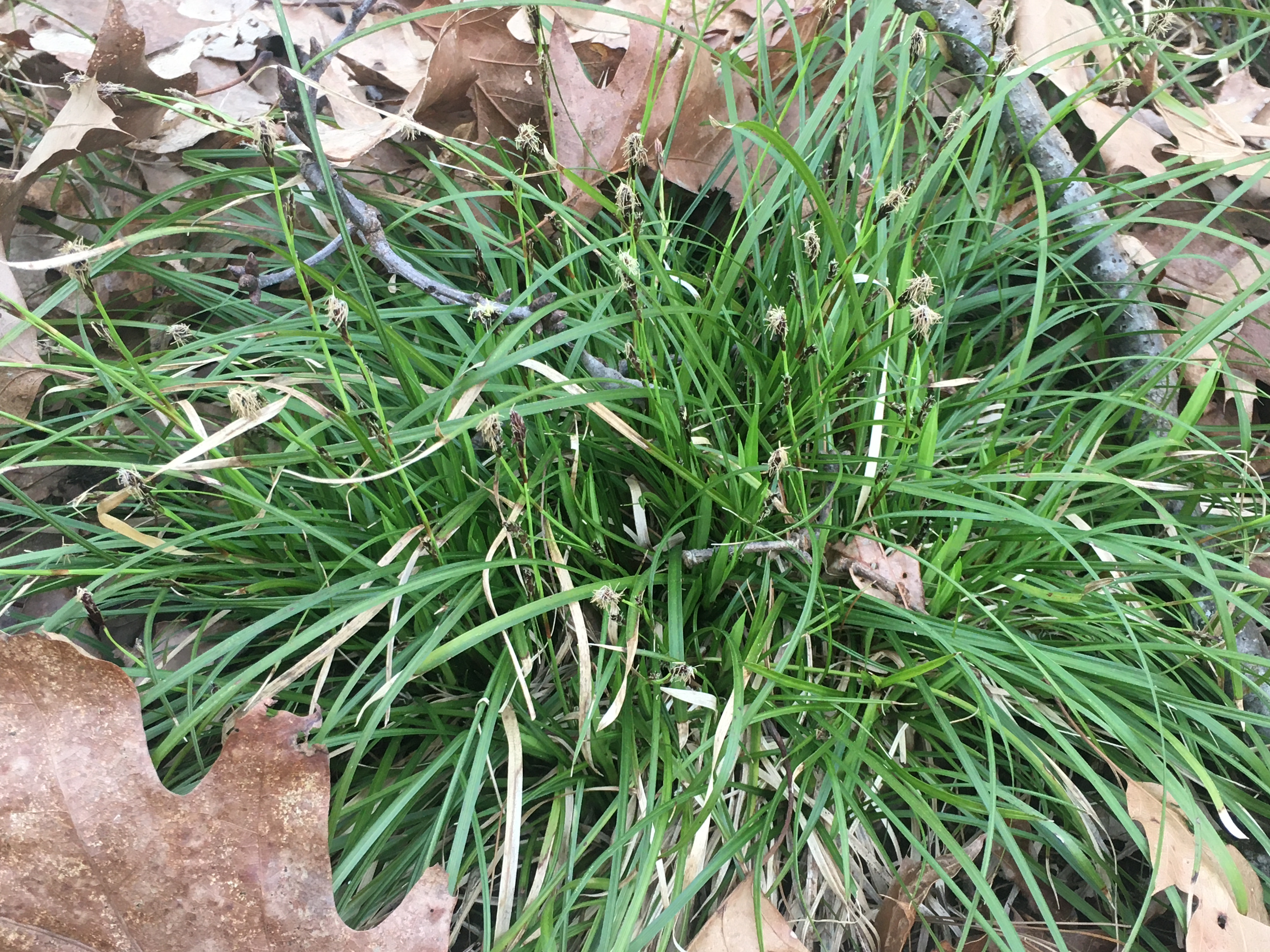

Scientific classification
- Kingdom: Plantae
- Clade: Embryophytes
- Clade: Tracheophytes
- Clade: Spermatophytes
- Clade: Angiosperms
- Clade: Monocots
- Clade: Commelinids
- Order: Poales
- Family: Cyperaceae
- Genus: Carex
- Species: C. communis

Binomial name
- Carex communis L.H.Bailey

Synonyms
- Carex amplisquama F.J.Herm.; Carex communis f. gynandra (Farw.) E.G.Voss; Carex communis var. gynandra Farw.

= Carex communis =

Species of plant

Carex communis, the fibrous-root sedge, is a species of flowering plant in the genus Carex, native to central and eastern Canada and the central and eastern United States. Its seeds are dispersed by ants.

== Subtaxa ==
The following varieties are accepted:

- Carex communis var. amplisquama (F.J.Herm.) Rettig
- Carex communis var. communis
