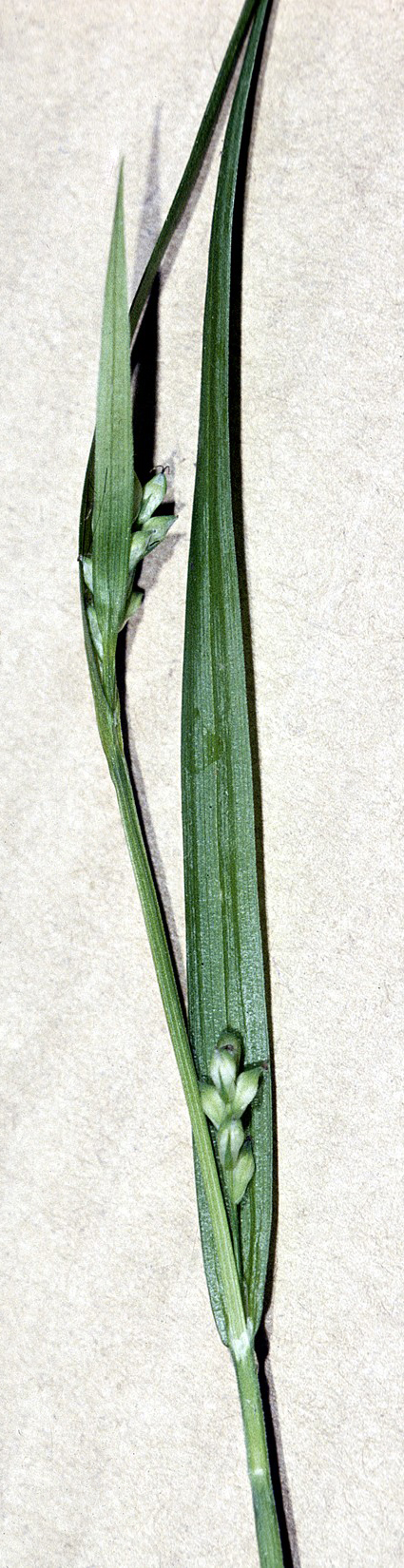

Scientific classification
- Kingdom: Plantae
- Clade: Tracheophytes
- Clade: Angiosperms
- Clade: Monocots
- Clade: Commelinids
- Order: Poales
- Family: Cyperaceae
- Genus: Carex
- Species: C. leptonervia

Binomial name
- Carex leptonervia Fernald, 1914

= Carex leptonervia =

Species of sedge

Carex leptonervia, also known as nerveless woodland sedge, is a species of flowering plant in the sedge family, Cyperaceae. It is native to Eastern Canada and the United States.

== See also ==
- List of Carex species
