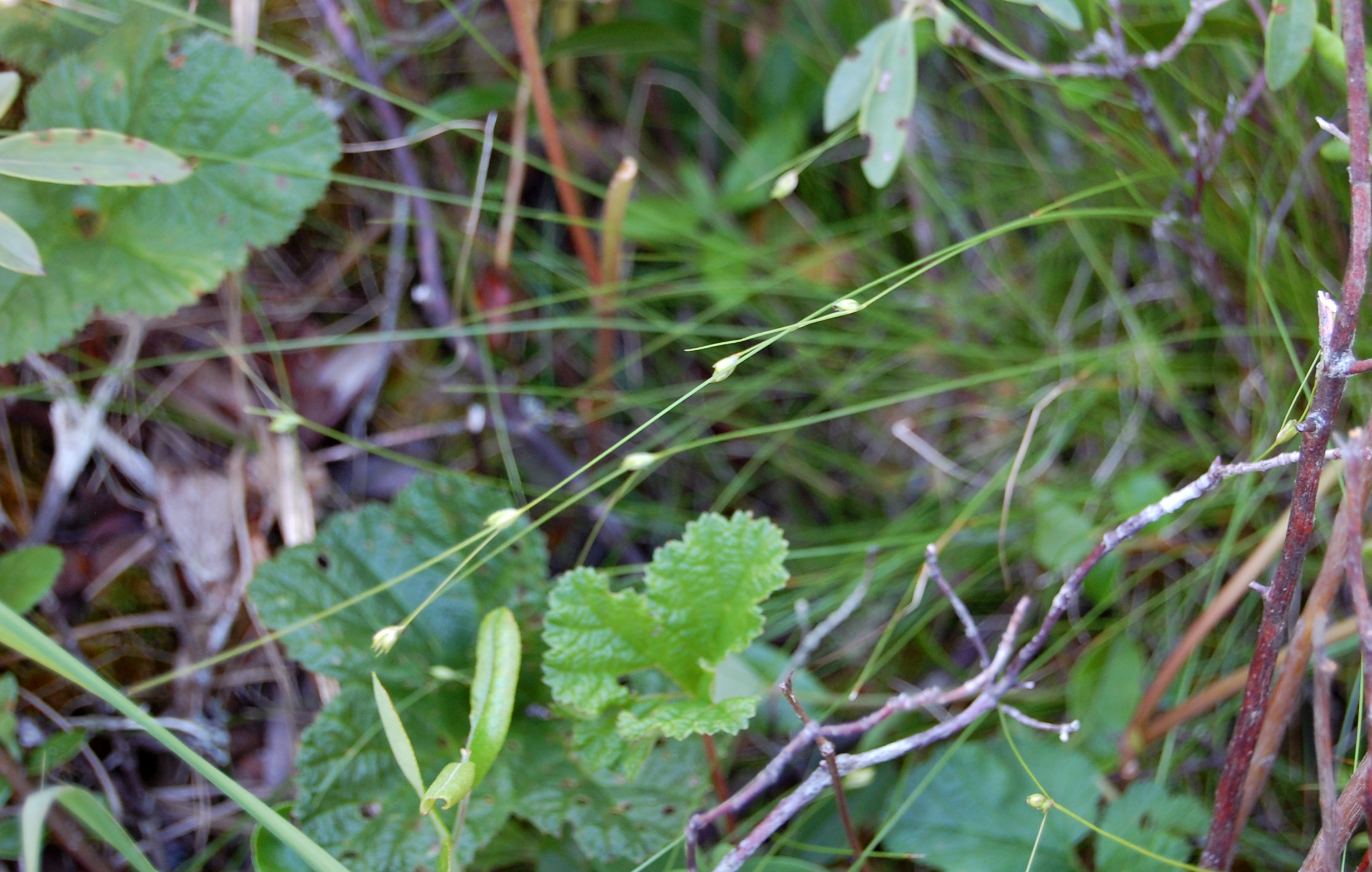
- Habit

Conservation status
- Least Concern (IUCN 3.1)

Scientific classification
- Kingdom: Plantae
- Clade: Tracheophytes
- Clade: Angiosperms
- Clade: Monocots
- Clade: Commelinids
- Order: Poales
- Family: Cyperaceae
- Genus: Carex
- Species: C. trisperma

Binomial name
- Carex trisperma Dewey

Synonyms
- Carex billingsii (O.W.Knight) Kirschb.; Carex trisperma f. billingsii (O.W.Knight) B.Boivin; Neskiza trisperma (Dewey) Raf.

= Carex trisperma =

Species of flowering plant in the sedge family

Carex trisperma, the three-seeded sedge, is a species of flowering plant in the genus Carex, native to Canada, Greenland, and the northeastern United States. It is typically found in acidic bogs within forests.

== Description ==
Carex trisperma is a clump-forming, perennial plant, which grows from a rhizome. Leaves are basal and alternate, flat, with whitish leaf sheaths. Stems are slender, measuring up to 2 feet in length. There are generally up the 3 stalkless spikes, with staminate flowers at the base and pistillate flowers at the tip. Basal sheaths are brownish in colour. The fruit is an achene, developing in late spring through to summer.

== Distribution and habitat ==
Carex trisperma has a circumpolar distribution, favouring wetland conditions, swampland, bogs within coniferous forests.

== Subtaxa ==
The following subspecies are currently accepted:

- Carex trisperma var. billingsii O.W.Knight
- Carex trisperma var. trisperma
