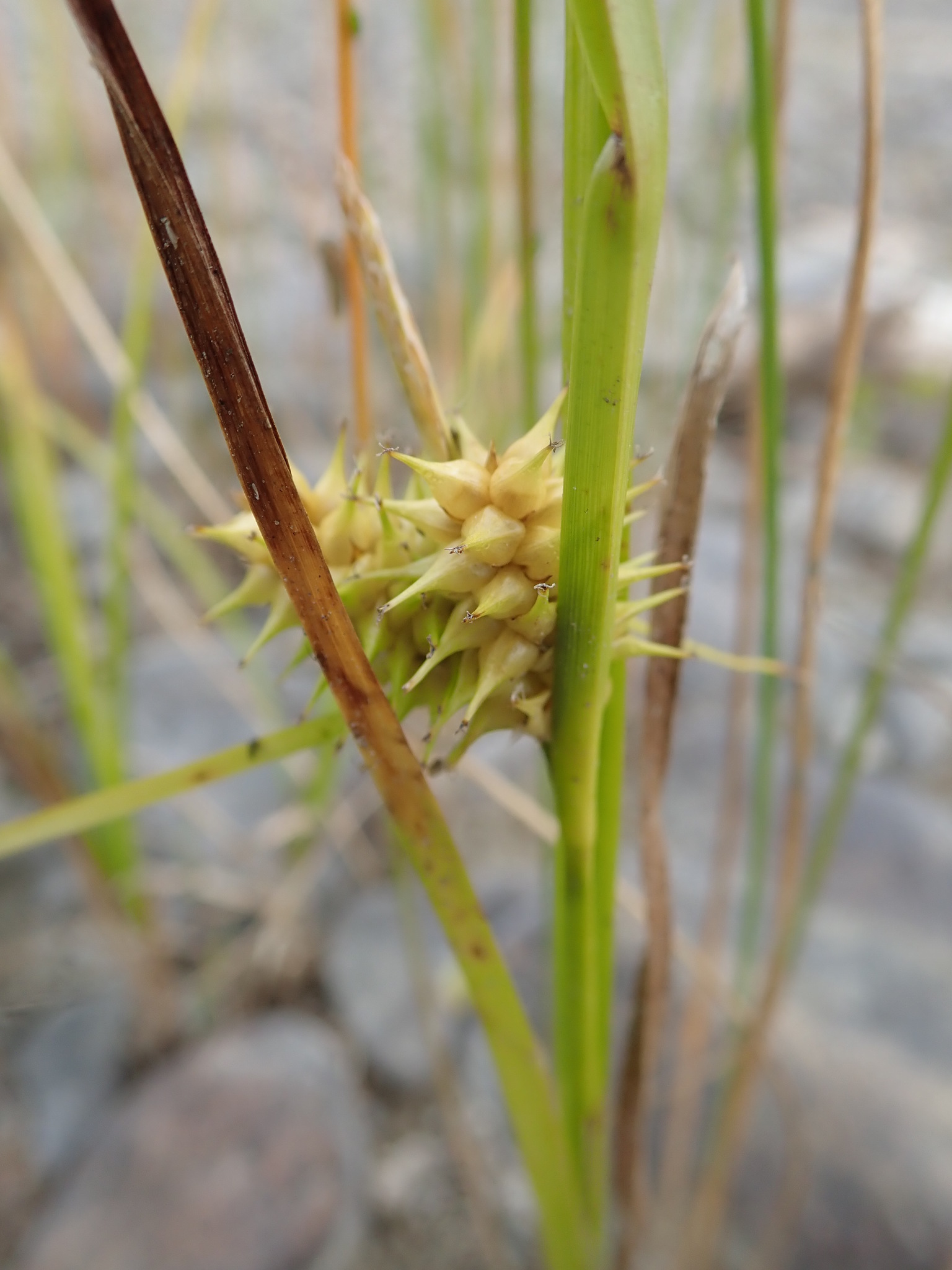

Scientific classification
- Kingdom: Plantae
- Clade: Tracheophytes
- Clade: Angiosperms
- Clade: Monocots
- Clade: Commelinids
- Order: Poales
- Family: Cyperaceae
- Genus: Carex
- Section: Carex sect. Ceratocystis
- Species: C. cryptolepis

Binomial name
- Carex cryptolepis Mack.

= Carex cryptolepis =

Species of grass-like plant

Carex cryptolepis, known as northeastern sedge, is a North American species of sedge first described by Kenneth Mackenzie in 1914.

It grows in wetlands such as shorelines, swales, and fens of the Great Lakes region, northeastern United States, and southcentral/southeastern Canada. It may hybridize with Carex viridula.
