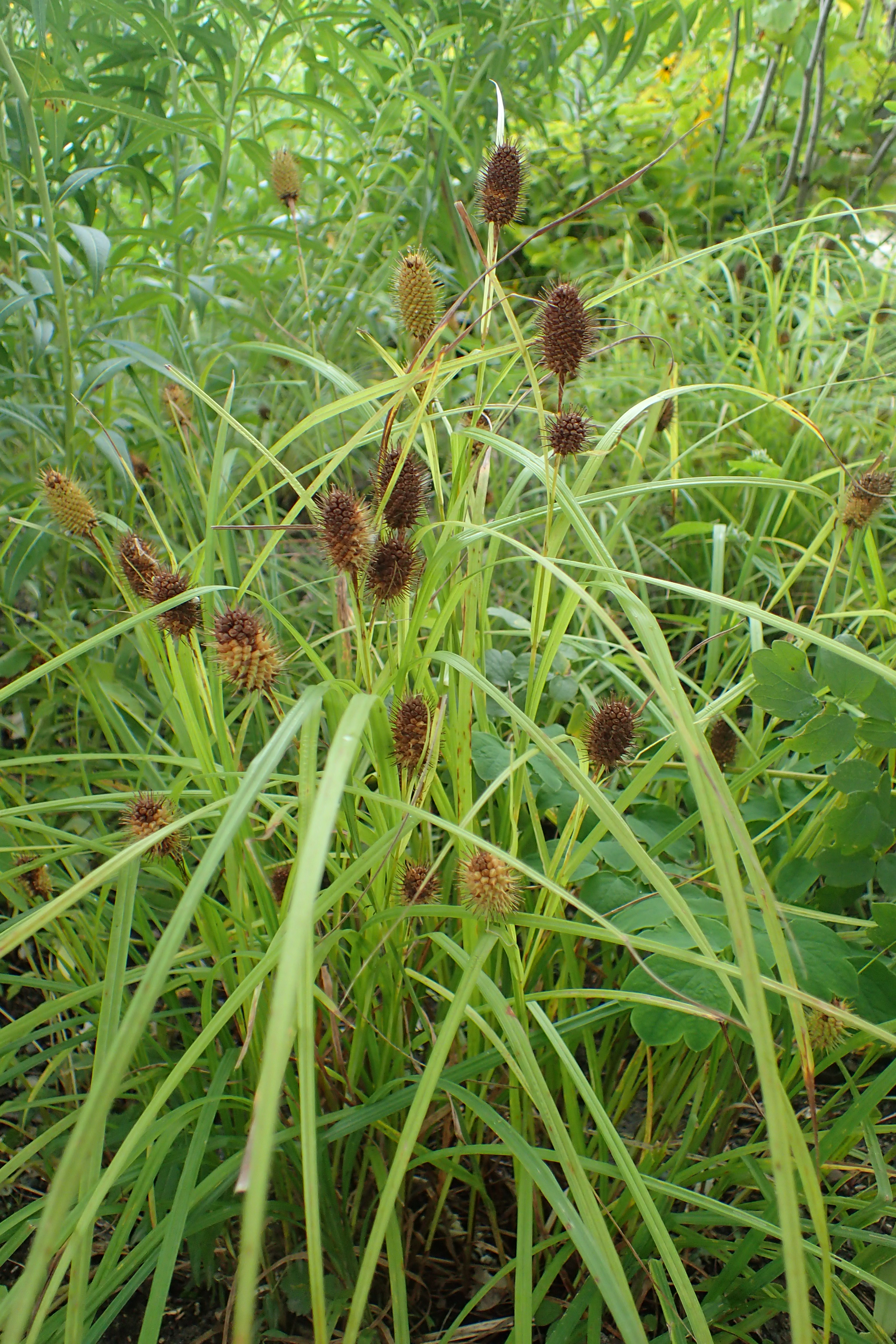
- Habit
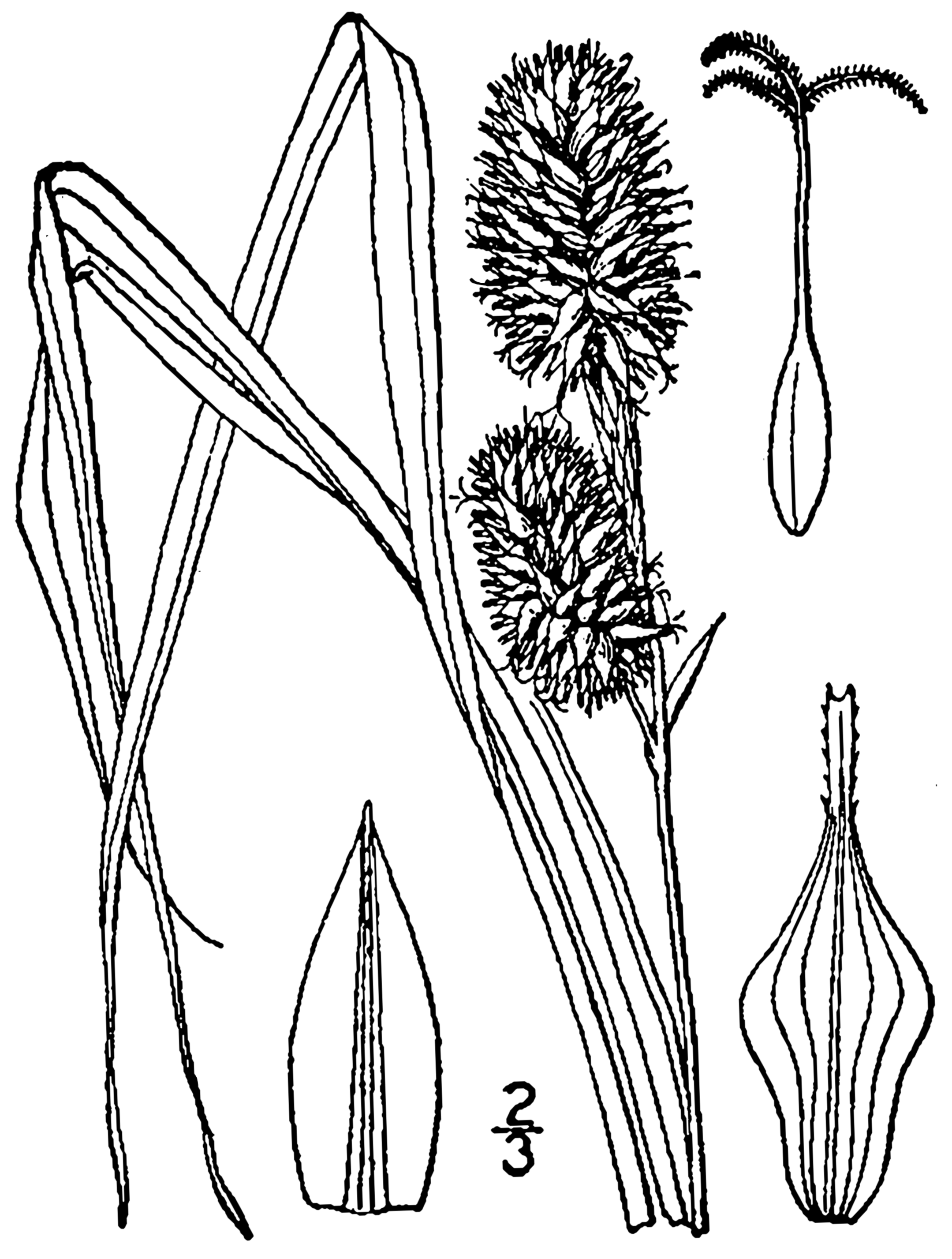
- Botanical illustration

Scientific classification
- Kingdom: Plantae
- Clade: Tracheophytes
- Clade: Angiosperms
- Clade: Monocots
- Clade: Commelinids
- Order: Poales
- Family: Cyperaceae
- Genus: Carex
- Species: C. squarrosa

Binomial name
- Carex squarrosa L.

Synonyms
- List: Carex squarrosa f. robusta Peck; Carex squarrosa var. typhinoides (Schwein.) Dewey; Carex typhinoides Schwein.; Vignea squarrosa (L.) Rchb.

= Carex squarrosa =

Species of grass-like plant

Carex squarrosa is a species of sedge (genus Carex), native to the central and eastern United States, and Ontario in Canada. It is typically found in bottomland hardwood forests and other wet habitats.
