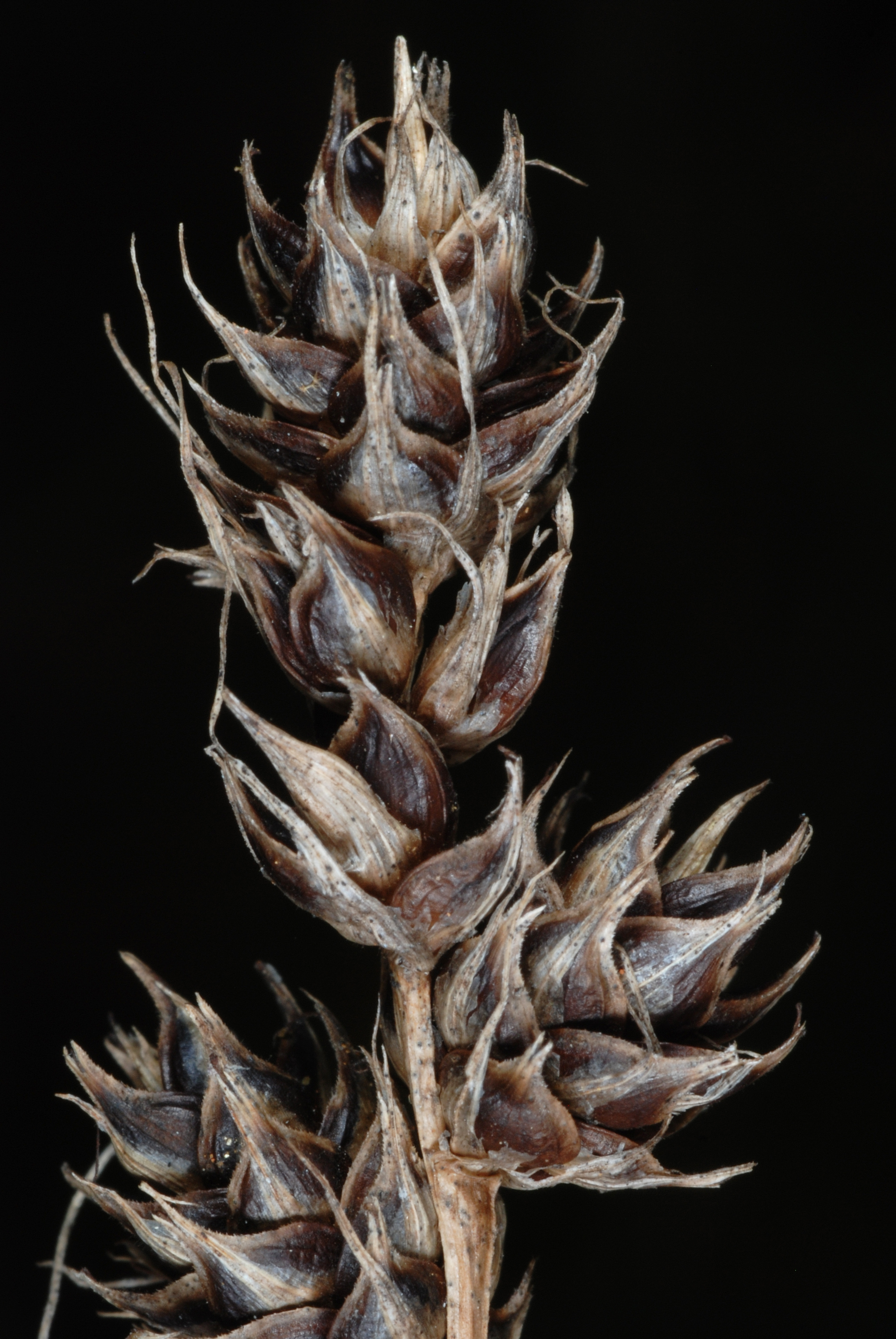

Scientific classification
- Kingdom: Plantae
- Clade: Tracheophytes
- Clade: Angiosperms
- Clade: Monocots
- Clade: Commelinids
- Order: Poales
- Family: Cyperaceae
- Genus: Carex
- Species: C. gravida

Binomial name
- Carex gravida L.H.Bailey

= Carex gravida =

Species of plant

Carex gravida, also known as heavy-fruited sedge, heavy sedge or long-awned bracted sedge, is a tussock-forming species of perennial sedge in the family Cyperaceae. It is native to southern parts of Canada and parts of the United States.

== Description ==
The sedge can form a densely packed turf like arrangement with plants having no obvious rhizomes. It has 20 to 100 cm (7.9 to 39.4 in) long culms that are 2.5 to 8 mm (0.098 to 0.315 in) wide at the base and 0.7 to 1.6 mm (0.028 to 0.063 in) wide at the terminus. The leaves are surrounded by loose sheaths. The 4 to 8 mm (0.16 to 0.31 in) wide leaves have green and white striping at the terminal end with transverse veins on the back. The front side is covered in 2 to 7 mm (0.079 to 0.276 in) long projections. It forms inflorescences that have five to fifteen spikes that are 1 to 5 cm (0.39 to 1.97 in) in length and 8 to 15 mm (0.31 to 0.59 in) wide.

== Taxonomy ==
The species was first described by the botanist Liberty Hyde Bailey in 1889 as published in Memoirs of the Torrey Botanical Club. It has four synonyms;

- Carex gravida var. laxifolia L.H.Bailey in 1889
- Carex gravida f. laxifolia (L.H.Bailey) Kük. in 1909
- Carex gravida var. lunelliana (Mack.) F.J.Herm. in 1936
- Carex lunelliana Mack. in 1915.

== Distribution ==
It is mostly found growing in temperate biomes in south eastern Canada in the province of Saskatchewan in the west through Manitoba to Ontario in the east. In the United States it is found as far west as Montana in the north down to Texas and New Mexico in the south west. The range extends to New York in the north east to around Virginia in the south east. It has been introduced in Delaware, Maryland and North Carolina.

== See also ==
- List of Carex species
