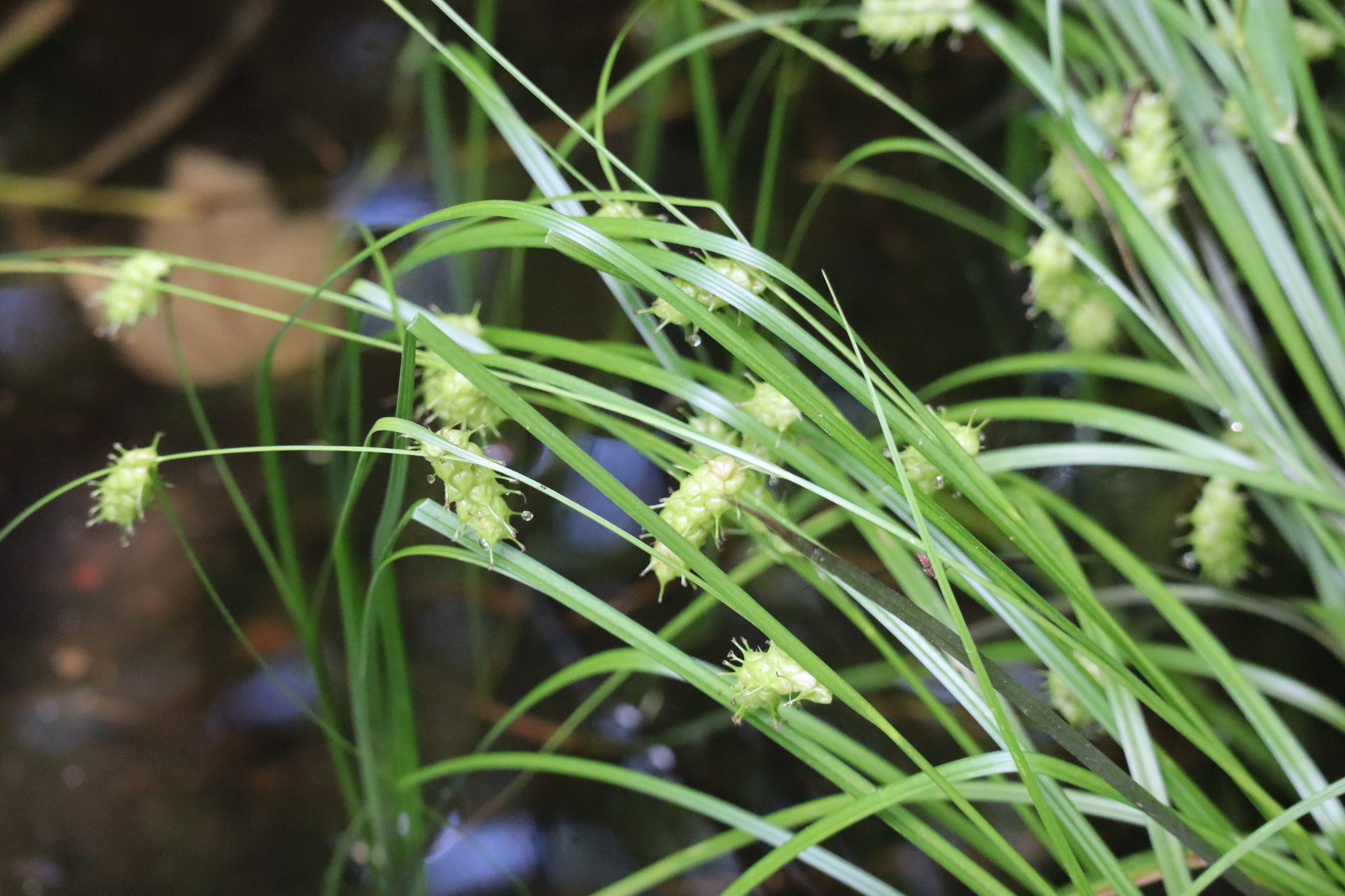

Conservation status
- Least Concern (IUCN 3.1)

Scientific classification
- Kingdom: Plantae
- Clade: Tracheophytes
- Clade: Angiosperms
- Clade: Monocots
- Clade: Commelinids
- Order: Poales
- Family: Cyperaceae
- Genus: Carex
- Subgenus: Carex subg. Carex
- Section: Carex sect. Vesicariae
- Species: C. tuckermanii

Binomial name
- Carex tuckermanii Boott

= Carex tuckermanii =

Species of plant in the sedge family

Carex tuckermanii, commonly known as Tuckerman's sedge, is a species of true sedge in the family Cyperaceae. It is a perennial plant native to North America.It owes its name to Edward Tuckerman, who was the first botanist to organize the genus Carex into natural groupings.

== Description ==
Carex tuckermanii is a tussock-forming plant, which can grow up to 48 inches in height. Leaves are basal and alternate, and usually grow longer than the stem. The basal part of the stem is sheathed, and is usually purplish in colour. Spikes are staminate or pistillate, the pistillate spikes developing clusters of achenes in late spring to summer.

== Distribution and habitat ==
Carex tuckermanii favours a wetland habitat, such as lake edges, swamps and marshes.

== Conservation status ==
Although Carex tuckermanii is listed as a least-concern species worldwide, it is now endangered in Illinois, Maryland, Massachusetts, and New Jersey. It is also listed as a special concern species in Connecticut.
