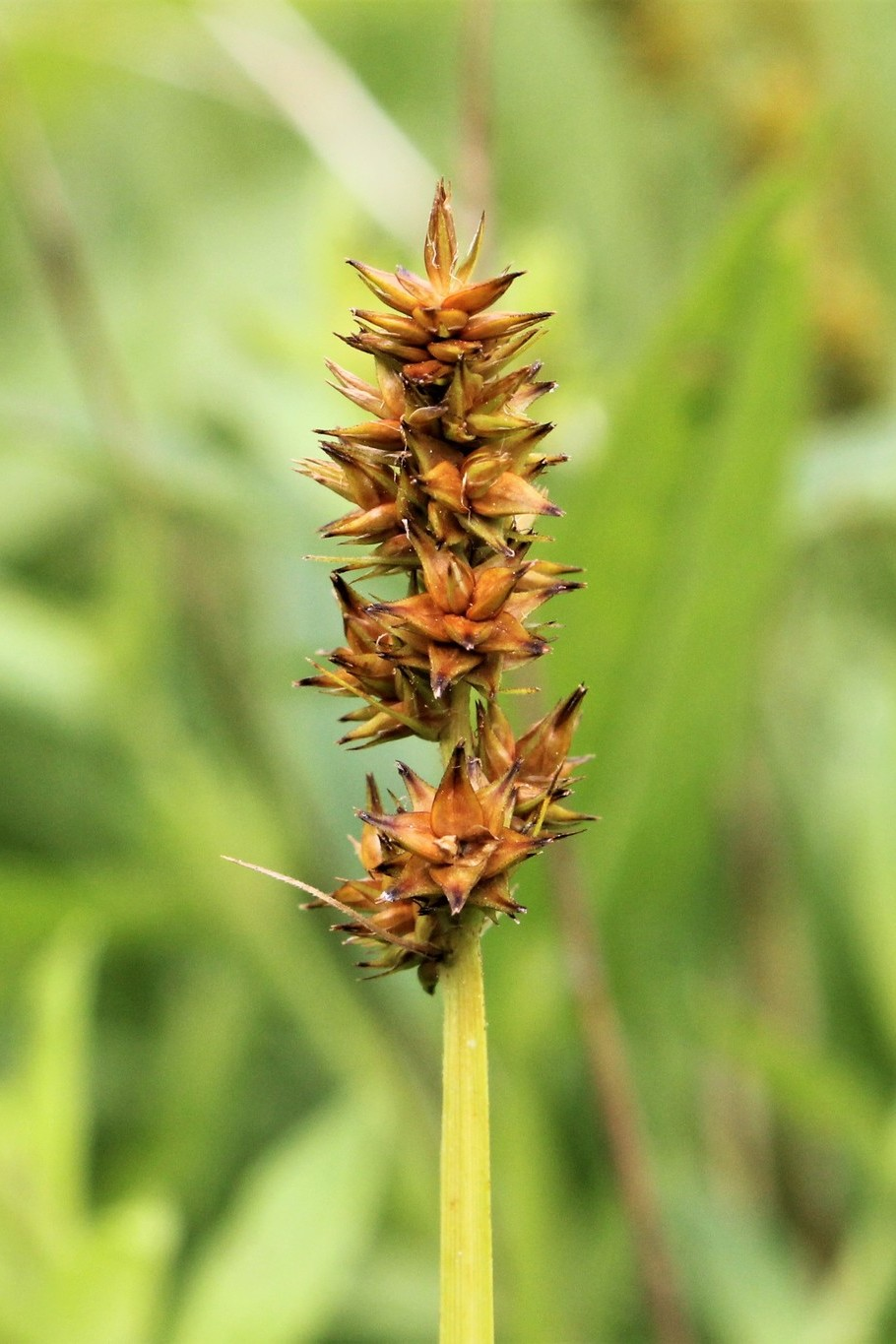

Scientific classification
- Kingdom: Plantae
- Clade: Tracheophytes
- Clade: Angiosperms
- Clade: Monocots
- Clade: Commelinids
- Order: Poales
- Family: Cyperaceae
- Genus: Carex
- Species: C. alopecoidea

Binomial name
- Carex alopecoidea Tuck.

= Carex alopecoidea =

Species of grass-like plant

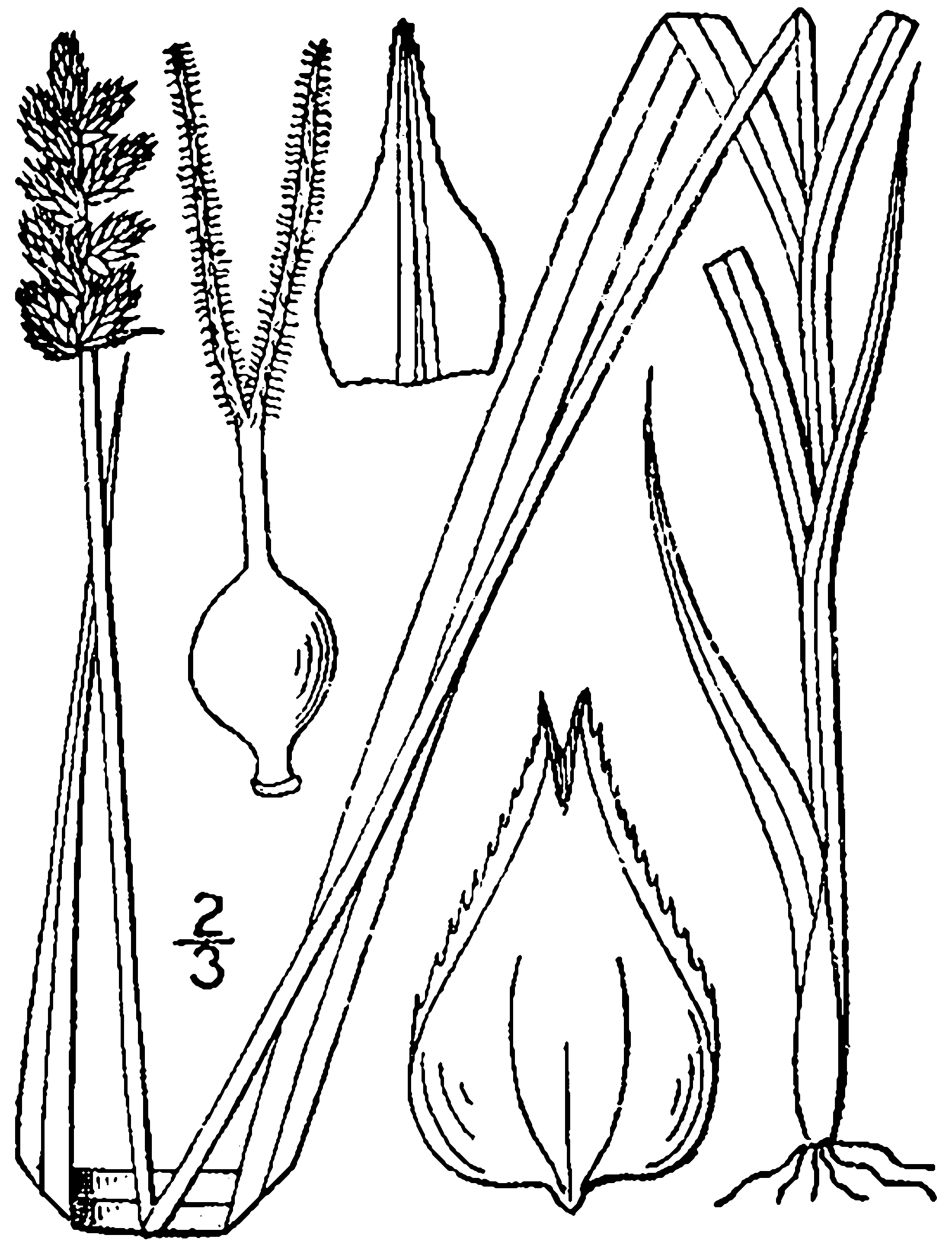
Carex alopecoidea

Carex alopecoidea, common names foxtail sedge and northern fox sedge, is a species of Carex native to North America. It is listed as threatened in Connecticut. It is listed as endangered in Indiana, New Jersey, Ohio, as possibly extirpated in Maine, as threatened in Massachusetts, and as endangered and possibly extirpated in Tennessee.
