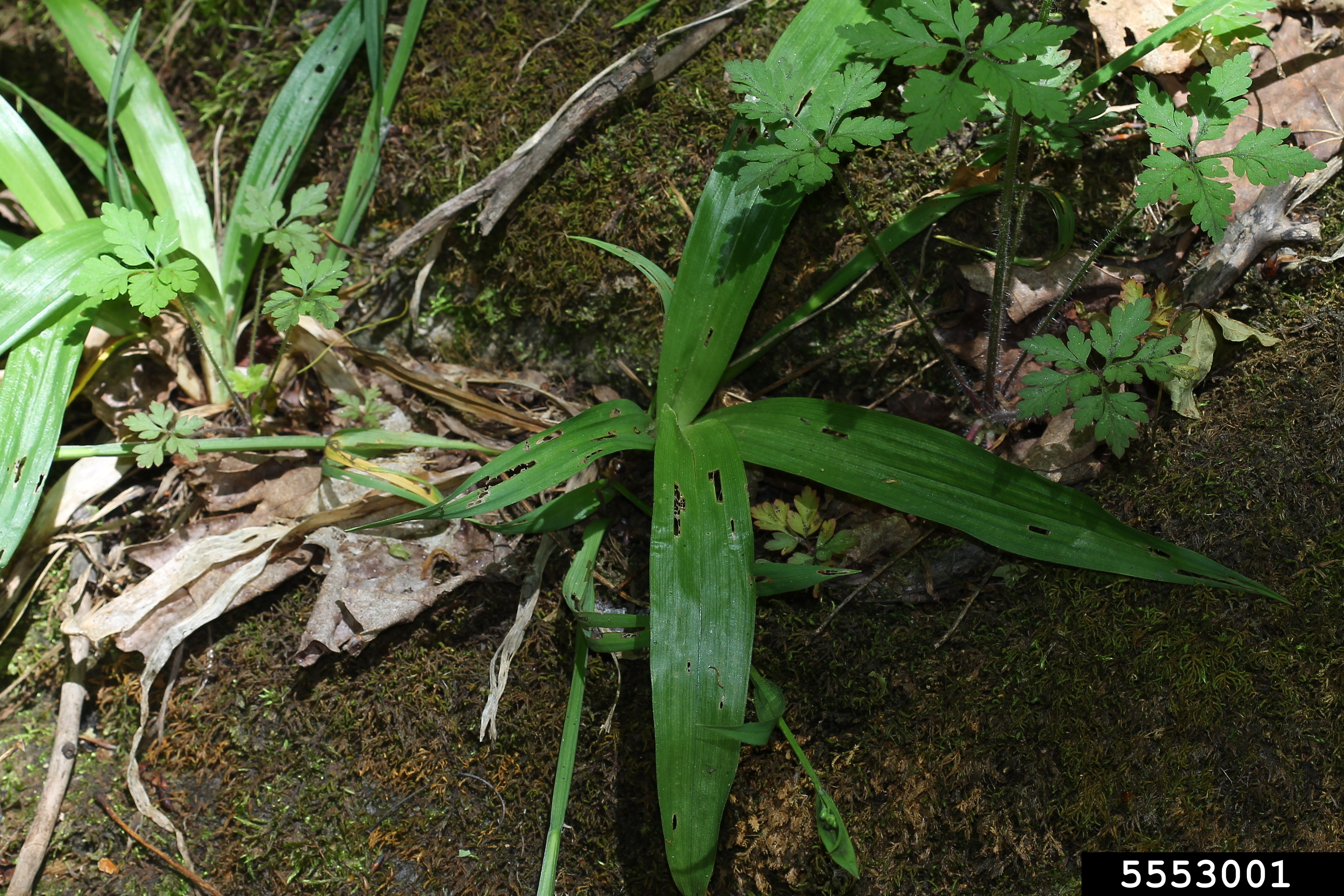

Scientific classification
- Kingdom: Plantae
- Clade: Embryophytes
- Clade: Tracheophytes
- Clade: Spermatophytes
- Clade: Angiosperms
- Clade: Monocots
- Clade: Commelinids
- Order: Poales
- Family: Cyperaceae
- Genus: Carex
- Subgenus: Carex subg. Carex
- Section: Carex sect. Laxiflorae
- Species: C. albursina

Binomial name
- Carex albursina E. Sheld.

Synonyms
- Carex laxiflora var. latifolia Lam.

= Carex albursina =

White Bear sedge

Species of grass-like plant

Carex albursina, commonly known as the White bear sedge or blunt-scaled wood sedge, is a wide-leaved sedge that typically grows in moist deciduous or mixed woods in eastern North America. It was named after White Bear Lake in east central Minnesota, where it was discovered by Edmund Perry Sheldon in the 1890s. The leaves are 10–38 mm (3/8–1 1/2 inches) wide and 10–35 cm (4–14 inches) long.
