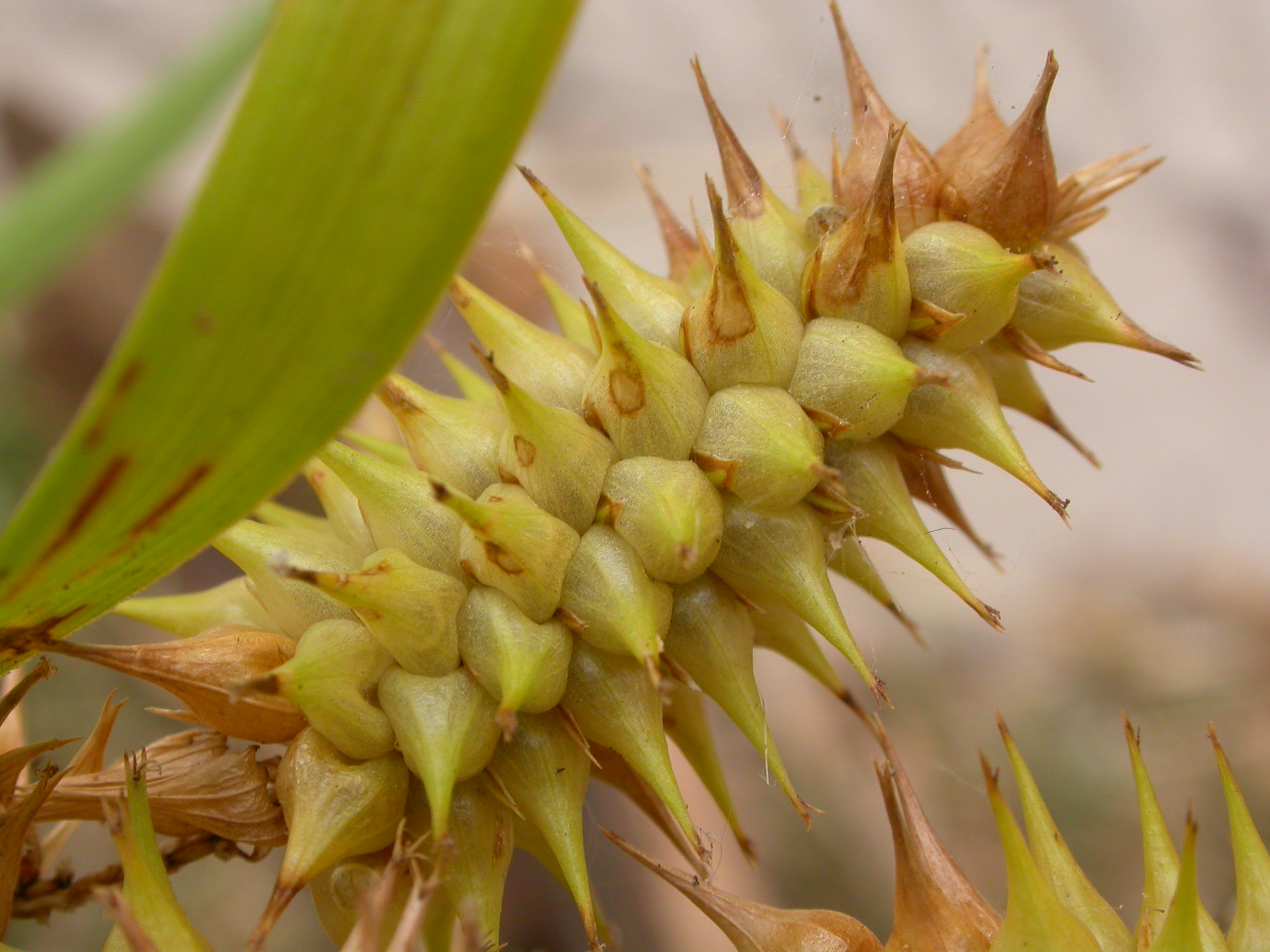
- Seedheads remain on plant into winter, providing ornamental value
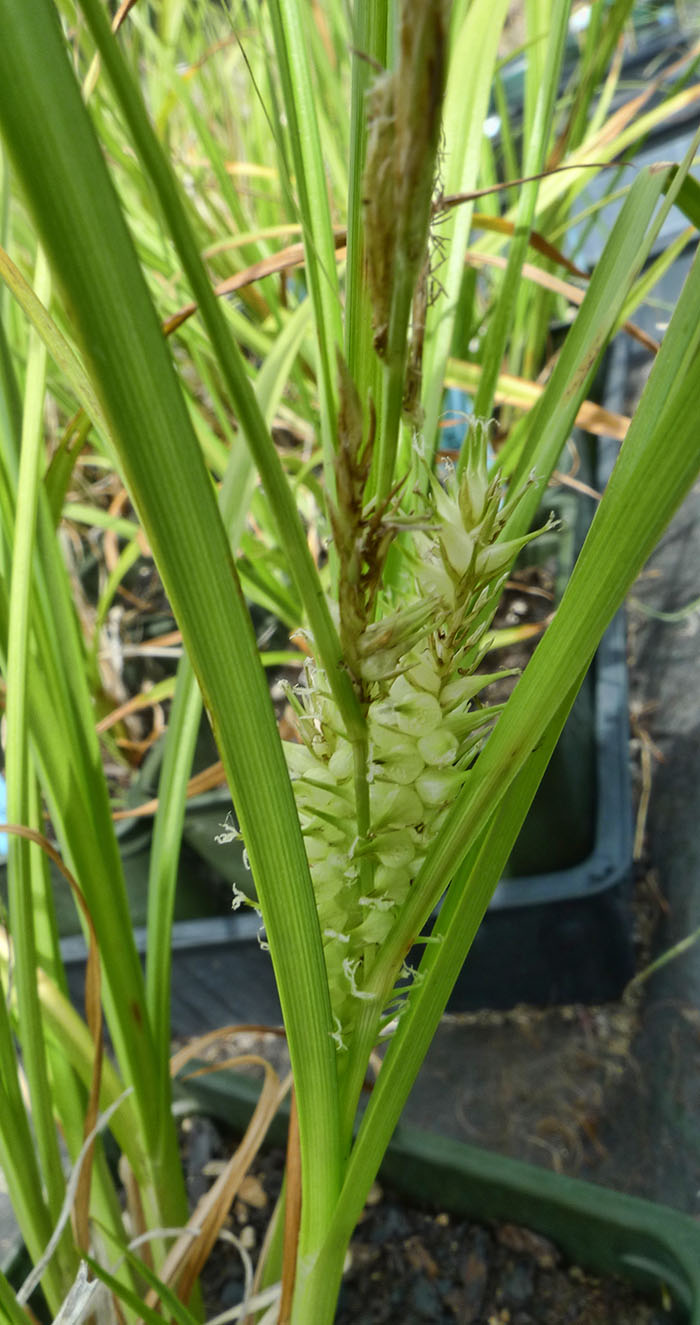
- Growing in nursery flats

Conservation status
- Least Concern (IUCN 3.1)

Scientific classification
- Kingdom: Plantae
- Clade: Tracheophytes
- Clade: Angiosperms
- Clade: Monocots
- Clade: Commelinids
- Order: Poales
- Family: Cyperaceae
- Genus: Carex
- Species: C. retrorsa

Binomial name
- Carex retrorsa Schwein.

Synonyms
- List: Carex lupulina var. gigantoidea Dewey; Carex retrorsa var. gigantoides Farw.; Carex retrorsa var. multispicula Lepage; Carex retrorsa var. robinsonii Fernald; Carex reversa Spreng.

= Carex retrorsa =

Species of flowering plant in the sedge family

Carex retrorsa, (commonly known as knotsheath sedge, deflexed bottlebrush sedge, or retrorse sedge), is a widespread species of flowering plant in the family Cyperaceae, native to southern Canada and the northern United States.

== Description ==
Carex retrorsa is a clump-forming, rhizomatous sedge. Leaves are bright green and smooth. Basal sheaths are generally brown to purple in colour, often splitting into a ladder shape. Inflorescence consists of multiple spikes, with the terminal spike all-staminate. Bracts are shorter than the lowest pistillate spike. Perigynia are hairless, beaked and toothed, and achenes are triangular in cross-section.

Fruit develops in late spring to summer. Pistillate spikes form clusters of seeds. Each pistillate spike contains 20 to 150 achenes.

== Distribution and habitat ==
Carex retrorsa thrives in stream and lake shores, marshes, swamps, water meadows and alongside waterways. Preferring wet areas and tolerant of some shade, it is available from speciality nurseries for such uses as ecological restoration projects, erosion control, and rain gardens.
