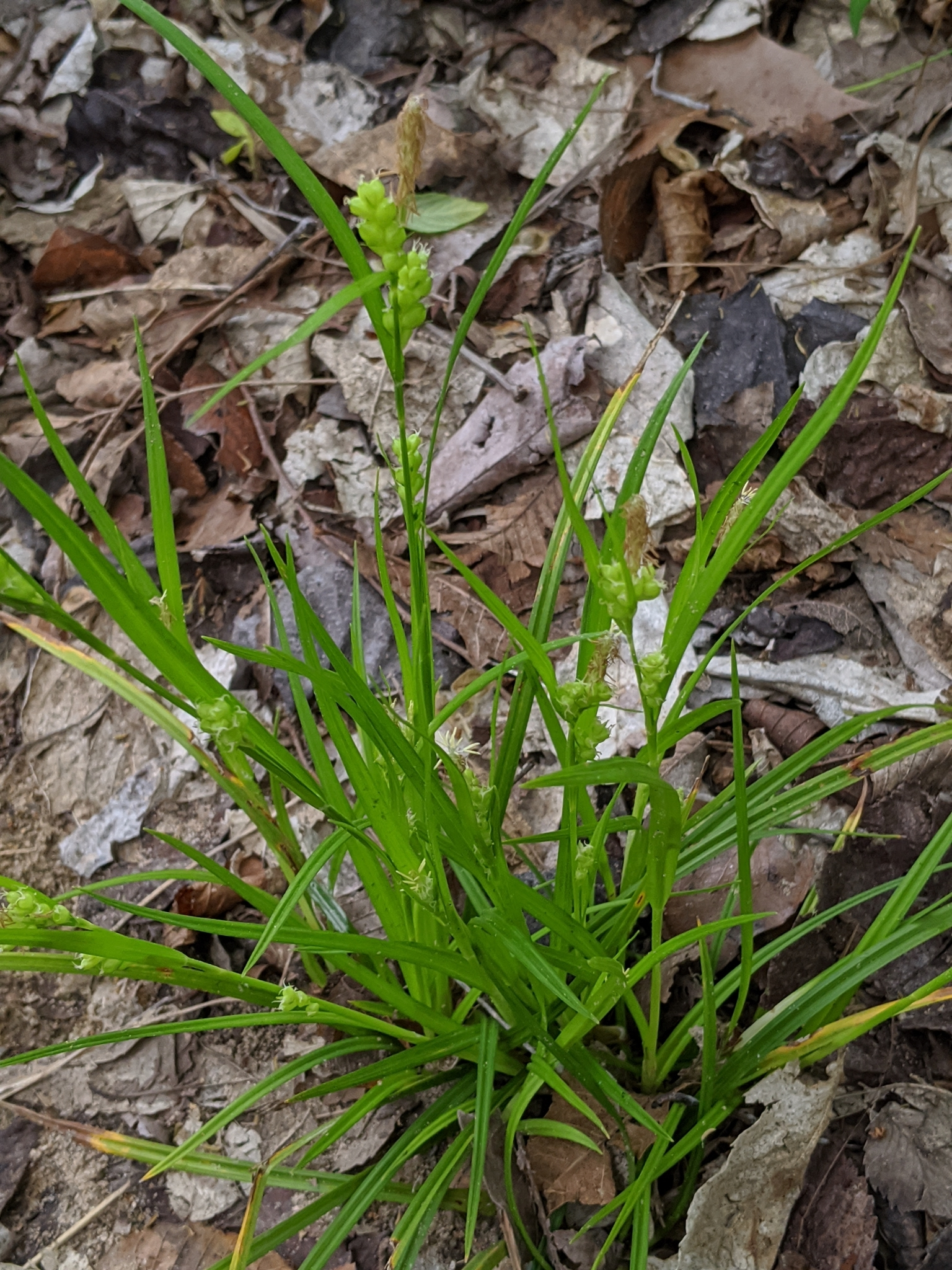

Scientific classification
- Kingdom: Plantae
- Clade: Tracheophytes
- Clade: Angiosperms
- Clade: Monocots
- Clade: Commelinids
- Order: Poales
- Family: Cyperaceae
- Genus: Carex
- Section: Carex sect. Laxiflorae
- Species: C. blanda

Binomial name
- Carex blanda Dewey

= Carex blanda =

Species of grass-like plant

Carex blanda, the common woodland sedge or eastern woodland sedge, is a species of sedge native to a wide variety of habitats in the eastern and central United States and Canada.

Its leaves are 1–10 mm (1/32–13/32 in) wide and 14–36 cm (5.5–14.2 in) long. The stem usually has a staminate (male) spike at the tip, two pistillate (female) spikes closely clustered near it, as well as another pistillate spike lower down. The pistillate spikes have 4 to 36 perigynia each, which develop into seeds (achenes).

Carex blanda is rather common in its native range, and tends to spread aggressively, particularly in disturbed soils.
