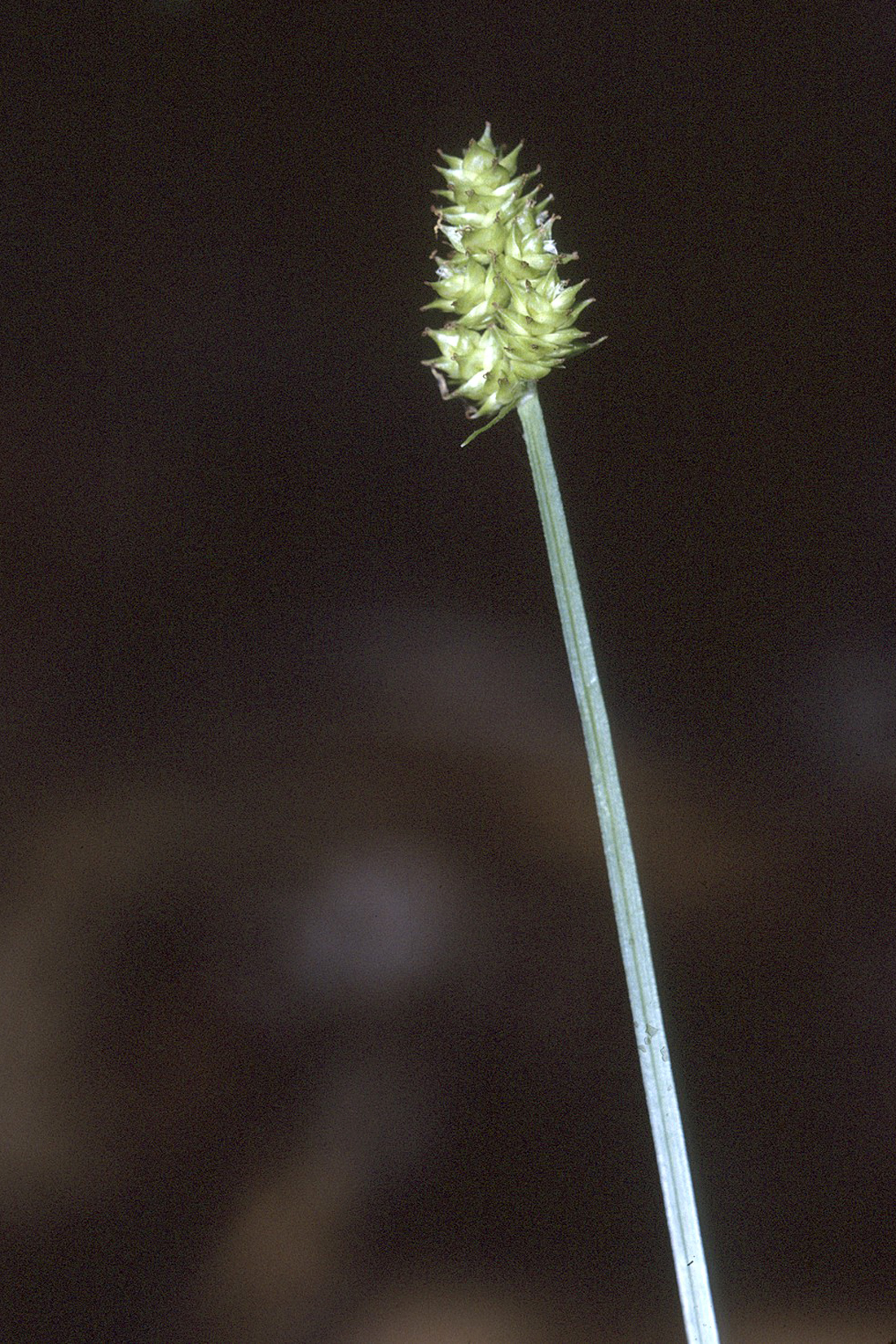
- Inflorescence

Scientific classification
- Kingdom: Plantae
- Clade: Tracheophytes
- Clade: Angiosperms
- Clade: Monocots
- Clade: Commelinids
- Order: Poales
- Family: Cyperaceae
- Genus: Carex
- Species: C. cephalophora

Binomial name
- Carex cephalophora Muhl. ex Willd.

Synonyms
- List: Carex cephalophora var. anomala Farw.; Carex cephalophora var. bracteosa Farw.; Carex cephalophora var. maxima Dewey; Diemisa cephalophora (Muhl. ex Willd.) Raf.; Vignea cephalophora (Muhl. ex Willd.) Rchb.

= Carex cephalophora =

Species of flowering plant

Carex cephalophora, called the oval-leaf sedge, oval-headed sedge, woodbank sedge, and short-headed bracted sedge, is a species of flowering plant in the genus Carex, native to the central and eastern United States and southeastern Canada, and introduced to Germany. It is found in late-succession old fields, even those that have become shaded woodlands.
