= Carex godfreyi =

Conservation status
- Vulnerable (NatureServe)

Scientific classification
- Kingdom: Plantae
- Clade: Tracheophytes
- Clade: Angiosperms
- Clade: Monocots
- Clade: Commelinids
- Order: Poales
- Family: Cyperaceae
- Genus: Carex
- Species: C. godfreyi

Binomial name
- Carex godfreyi Naczi

Species of plant

Carex godfreyi, common name Godfrey's sedge, is a tussock-forming species of perennial sedge in the family Cyperaceae. It is native to south eastern parts of the United States. Its common name is Godfrey's sedge.

== Description ==
The plants are either densely or loosely cespitose. The rhizome internodes are between 1.2 and 2 millimeters thick. The culms are dark purple-red in color, and 4 to 7.3 centimeters high at base. The leaves are glabrous and the blades are green. The 2 to 4 spikes are overlapping and have 3 to 19 perigynia. The anthers are between 2 and 2.8 millimeters long. The pistillate scales have usually have red-brown speckles. The achenes are either broadly obovoid or obovoid. It is a perennial grass that gets up to 30 inches in height. The fruit type is achene. The flower color is yellow, green, and brown in color. The fruiting period is between the months of March and May. The flowers are always in bloom.

It has frequent associates including, Carex bromoides, Carex gholsonii, and Carex leptalea.

== Distribution ==
It is found in the states of, Alabama, Florida, Georgia, North Carolina, and South Carolina. It is mostly found in the central counties of Florida. These counties include, Bay, Washington, Jackson, Gadsden, Liberty, Wakulla, Leon, Jefferson, Taylor, Dixie, Levy, Gilchrist, Suwannee, Columbia, Alachua, Marion, Citrus, Hernando, Pasco, Hillsborough, Polk, Martin, Sumter, Lake, Orange, Seminole, Volusia, Flagler, Clay, St. Johns, Duval, and Nassau.

It has a global rank of G3, meaning vulnerable. It also has three local ranks, S2 in Georgia, meaning imperiled, and S1 rank in Alabama and North Carolina, meaning critically imperiled. It doesn't have a local rank in Florida and South Carolina.

== See also ==
- List of Carex species
