= Carex waponahkikensis =

Scientific classification
- Kingdom: Plantae
- Clade: Tracheophytes
- Clade: Angiosperms
- Clade: Monocots
- Clade: Commelinids
- Order: Poales
- Family: Cyperaceae
- Genus: Carex
- Species: C. waponahkikensis

Binomial name
- Carex waponahkikensis Lovit & A.Haines

Synonyms
- Carex scoparia var. tesselata

Species of grass-like plant

Carex waponahkikensis, commonly known as the Dawn-land sedge, is a species of sedge first described by M. Lovit and A. Haines in 2012. It is native to a small range in the state of Maine as well as in adjacent parts of coastal New Brunswick.

== Taxonomy ==
Formerly known as Carex scoparia var. tesselata, it has been split from Carex scoparia based on inflorescence length, leaf blade width, and differences with the perigynium.

== Distribution ==
In Maine, the sedge is only known from Washington County and Hancock County in the eastern part of the state.
