= Carex ovalis =

Carex ovalis can refer to:

- Carex ovalis Gooden., a synonym of Carex leporina L.
- Carex ovalis Willd. ex Kunth, a synonym of Carex scoparia Schkuhr ex Willd.
