= Carex bella =

Conservation status
- Secure (NatureServe)

Scientific classification
- Kingdom: Plantae
- Clade: Tracheophytes
- Clade: Angiosperms
- Clade: Monocots
- Clade: Commelinids
- Order: Poales
- Family: Cyperaceae
- Genus: Carex
- Species: C. bella

Binomial name
- Carex bella L.H.Bailey

Species of plant

Carex bella is a tussock-forming species of perennial sedge in the family Cyperaceae. It is native to parts of the United States and Mexico, including California, Arizona, New Mexico, Utah, Colorado, Wyoming, and South Dakota in the United States, and Nuevo Leon in Mexico. Its common names are the Showy sedge, and the Southwestern Showy sedge.

== Description ==
It is a cespitose plant. The culms are between 25 and 55 centimetres (9.8 and 21.7 in) long and are proximally scabrous. The leaves are between 3 and 6 millimetres (0.12 and 0.24 in) wide. The inflorescences spikes are separate, pendent, and elongated. The 2 to 3 lateral spikes are either gynecandrous or, rarely, pistillate. The pistillate scales are light or dark brown in color. The smooth perigynia is either pale green or pale yellow in color. The achenes can nearly fill the perigynia. The fruiting time is between the months of June to August. 2n = 40.

== See also ==
- List of Carex species
