= Large-flowered everlasting =

Large-flowered everlasting is a common name for several plants and may refer to:

- Anaphalis margaritacea
- Helichrysum macranthum
