= Anaphalis acutifolia =

Scientific classification
- Kingdom: Plantae
- Clade: Tracheophytes
- Clade: Angiosperms
- Clade: Eudicots
- Clade: Asterids
- Order: Asterales
- Family: Asteraceae
- Genus: Anaphalis
- Species: A. acutifolia

Binomial name
- Anaphalis acutifolia Hand.-Mazz.

Species of flowering plant

Anaphalis acutifolia is a species of flowering plants within the family Asteraceae. It is found in South Tibet (Yadong).
