= Carex gholsonii =

Scientific classification
- Kingdom: Plantae
- Clade: Tracheophytes
- Clade: Angiosperms
- Clade: Monocots
- Clade: Commelinids
- Order: Poales
- Family: Cyperaceae
- Genus: Carex
- Species: C. gholsonii

Binomial name
- Carex gholsonii Naczi & Cochrane

Species of grass-like plant

Carex gholsonii, common name Gholson's sedge, is a plant species native to Florida, Georgia, Alabama, North Carolina and South Carolina.

Carex gholsonii grows in wet places such as marshes, floodplains, stream banks, etc. It is a monoecious, perennial herb up to 75 cm tall. Leaves are green, up to 30 cm long. Pistillate and staminate flowers are borne in separate spikes on the same plant. Perigynia are ellipsoid, olive to brownish-green, up to 4 mm long with a beak up to 0.5 mm long. Achenes are up to 3 mm long.
