= Anaphalis elegans =

Scientific classification
- Kingdom: Plantae
- Clade: Tracheophytes
- Clade: Angiosperms
- Clade: Eudicots
- Clade: Asterids
- Order: Asterales
- Family: Asteraceae
- Genus: Anaphalis
- Species: A. elegans

Binomial name
- Anaphalis elegans Ling

Species of flowering plant

Anaphalis elegans is a species of flowering plants within the family Asteraceae. It is found in China (W Sichuan (Dêgê) and NW Yunnan (Zhongdian)).
