= Anaphalis sahyadrica =

Scientific classification
- Kingdom: Plantae
- Clade: Embryophytes
- Clade: Tracheophytes
- Clade: Spermatophytes
- Clade: Angiosperms
- Clade: Eudicots
- Clade: Asterids
- Order: Asterales
- Family: Asteraceae
- Genus: Anaphalis
- Species: A. sahyadrica

Binomial name
- Anaphalis sahyadrica S.Remya, K.M.P.Kumar & Maya

Species of flowering plant

Anaphalis sahyadrica is a species of flowering plant in the family Asteraceae. It is endemic to the northern Western Ghats of India, first described in 2026.

It found in high altitude grassland and rocky plateau habitats, from 2,100 to 3,000 m (6,900 to 9,800 ft).

The name sahyadrica refers to Sahayadri, the local name for the Western Ghats in Malayalam.

== Description ==
It is recognized by its woolly leaves and small flower clusters, which are typical of the genus. The species diverges from its closely related relatives through a mixture of vegetative and floral traits.
