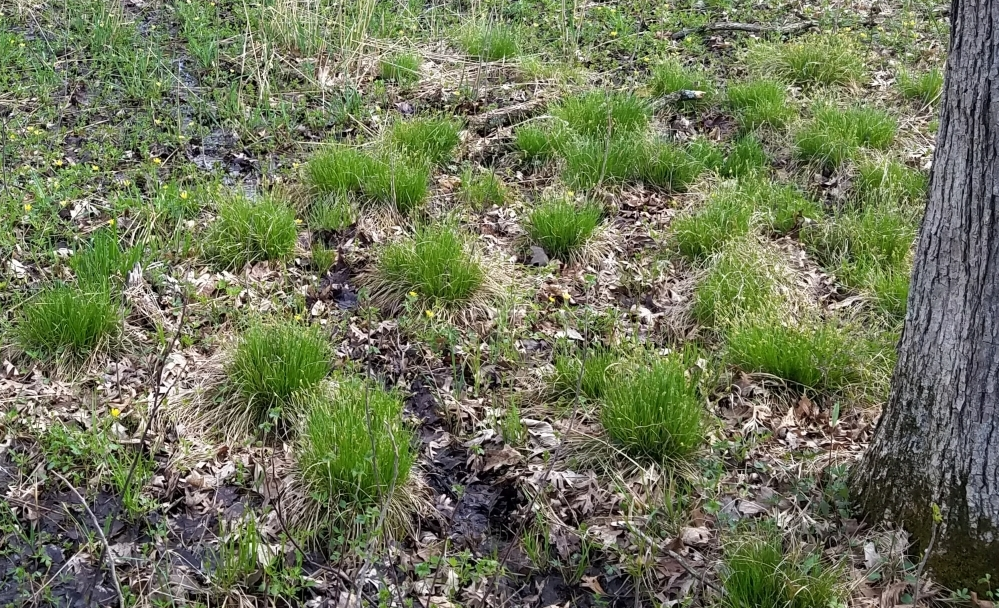

Scientific classification
- Kingdom: Plantae
- Clade: Tracheophytes
- Clade: Angiosperms
- Clade: Monocots
- Clade: Commelinids
- Order: Poales
- Family: Cyperaceae
- Genus: Carex
- Subgenus: Carex subg. Vignea
- Section: Carex sect. Deweyanae
- Species: C. bromoides

Binomial name
- Carex bromoides Willd.

= Carex bromoides =

Species of grass-like plant

Carex bromoides, known as brome-like sedge, brome-sedge, and dropseed of the woods, is a species of sedge in the genus Carex. It is native to North America.

== Taxonomy ==
Carex bromoides was described by Carl Ludwig Willdenow in 1805. It has two accepted subspecies:

- Carex bromoides subsp. bromoides — broadly distributed across eastern North America
- Carex bromoides subsp. montana Naczi — restricted to Virginia, North Carolina, and South Carolina

Carex bromoides subsp. montana has larger features including wider culms and leaf blades, as well as proportionately longer perigynium beaks.

== Distribution and habitat ==
Carex bromoides ranges across most of eastern North America, including Mexico, the United States, and Canada. It is found primarily in wooded wetland habitats, occasionally in wet meadows.
