= Anaphalis arfakensis =

Scientific classification
- Kingdom: Plantae
- Clade: Tracheophytes
- Clade: Angiosperms
- Clade: Eudicots
- Clade: Asterids
- Order: Asterales
- Family: Asteraceae
- Genus: Anaphalis
- Species: A. arfakensis

Binomial name
- Anaphalis arfakensis Mattf.

Species of flowering plant

Anaphalis arfakensis is a species of flowering plants within the family Asteraceae. It is an endemic species found in New Guinea.
