= Anaphalis travancorica =

Scientific classification
- Kingdom: Plantae
- Clade: Tracheophytes
- Clade: Angiosperms
- Clade: Eudicots
- Clade: Asterids
- Order: Asterales
- Family: Asteraceae
- Genus: Anaphalis
- Species: A. travancorica

Binomial name
- Anaphalis travancorica W.W.Sm.

Species of flowering plant

Anaphalis travancorica is a herbaceous flowering plant within the Asteraceae family. The species typically grows on rocky slopes and grasslands.

== Phenology ==
Flowers and fruits from September to February.
