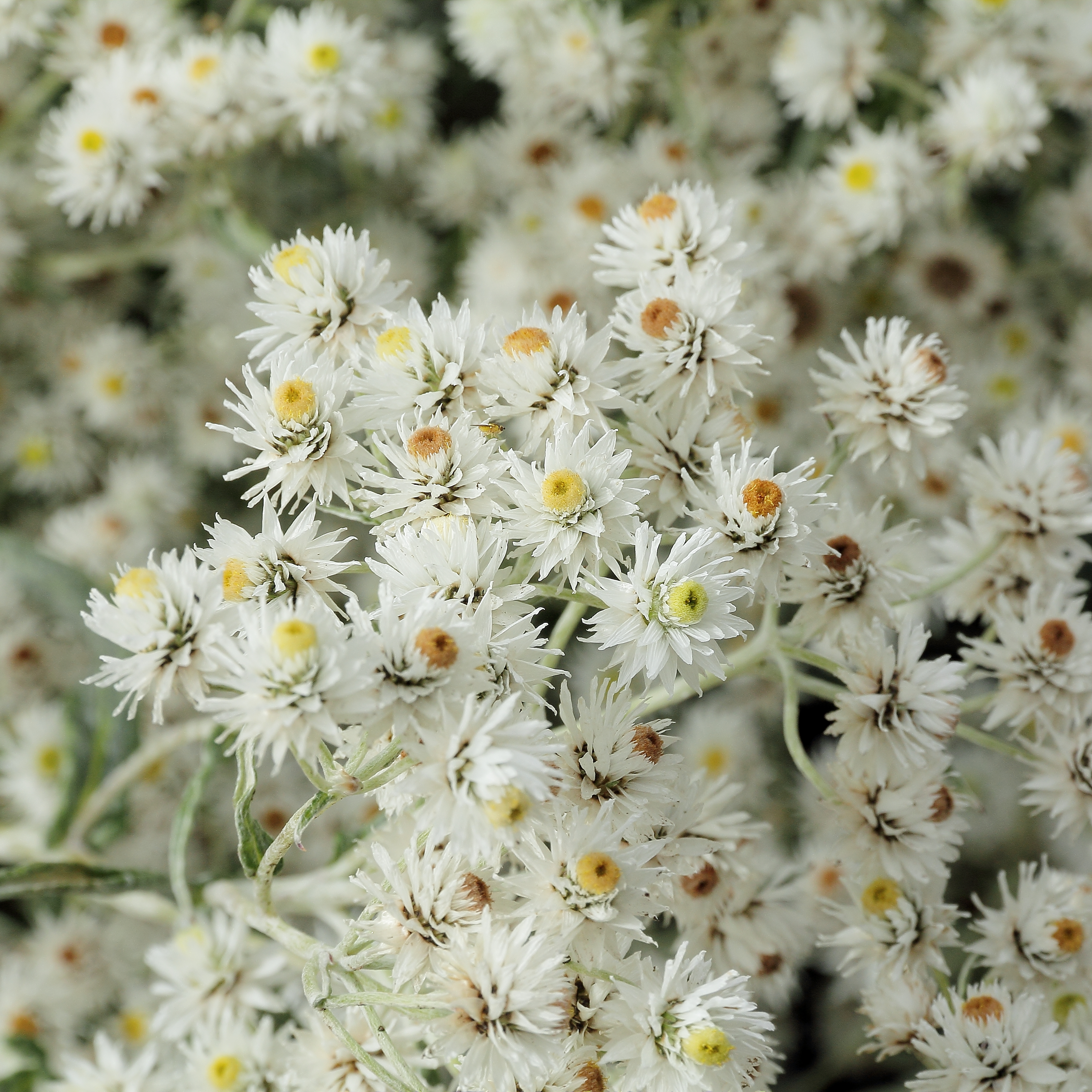

Scientific classification
- Kingdom: Plantae
- Clade: Tracheophytes
- Clade: Angiosperms
- Clade: Eudicots
- Clade: Asterids
- Order: Asterales
- Family: Asteraceae
- Genus: Anaphalis
- Species: A. triplinervis

Binomial name
- Anaphalis triplinervis (Sims) C.B.Clarke

Synonyms
- Antennaria triplinervis Sims; Gnaphalium cynoglossoides Treviranus; Gnaphalium cuneatum Wall. ex DC.; Gnaphalium nepalense Hort. ex DC.; Gnaphalium perfoliatum Wall.; Gnaphalium quintuplinerve Buch.-Ham. ex DC.

= Anaphalis triplinervis =

Species of plant

Anaphalis triplinervis is an Asian species of flowering herbaceous perennial plant in the family Asteraceae, native to the Himalayas (Tibet, Afghanistan, northern India, Nepal, Bhutan). Grey-green felted leaves produce sprays of small white flower heads.

The plants with their veined leaves are valued as groundcover, and the blooms as dried flowers, hence the common name triple-veined pearly everlasting.

== Garden and landscape uses ==
Pearly everlastings are suitable for flower beds and floral arrangements. They provide attractive, but not brilliant displays of bloom in late summer and fall. They are sometimes placed adjacent to red or blue flowers for aesthetic purposes. The flowers are useful for cutting and are easily prepared for dried arrangements. This is done by cutting them before they attain their fullest opening and before the whiteness of the stems and foliage begins to dim, tying the stems in small bundles, and hanging them in a cool, airy, shaded place. It is not uncommon to color the dried flowers by dipping them in dyes.

This plant and the cultivar 'Sommerschnee' ('Summer Snow') have gained the Royal Horticultural Society's Award of Garden Merit.

== Cultivation ==
Pearly everlastings thrive with little care in sunny locations where the soil is thoroughly well drained and tends to be dryish rather than wet. They are easily increased by division in early spring, and can be raised from seeds. Dividing in fall is likely to result in winter losses. On poor soils these plants benefit from a spring application of a complete garden fertilizer, but this is unnecessary where the soil is reasonably fertile. Old plants that show signs of deterioration should be dug up, divided, and replanted in fall or spring. This may be needed every third or fourth year.
