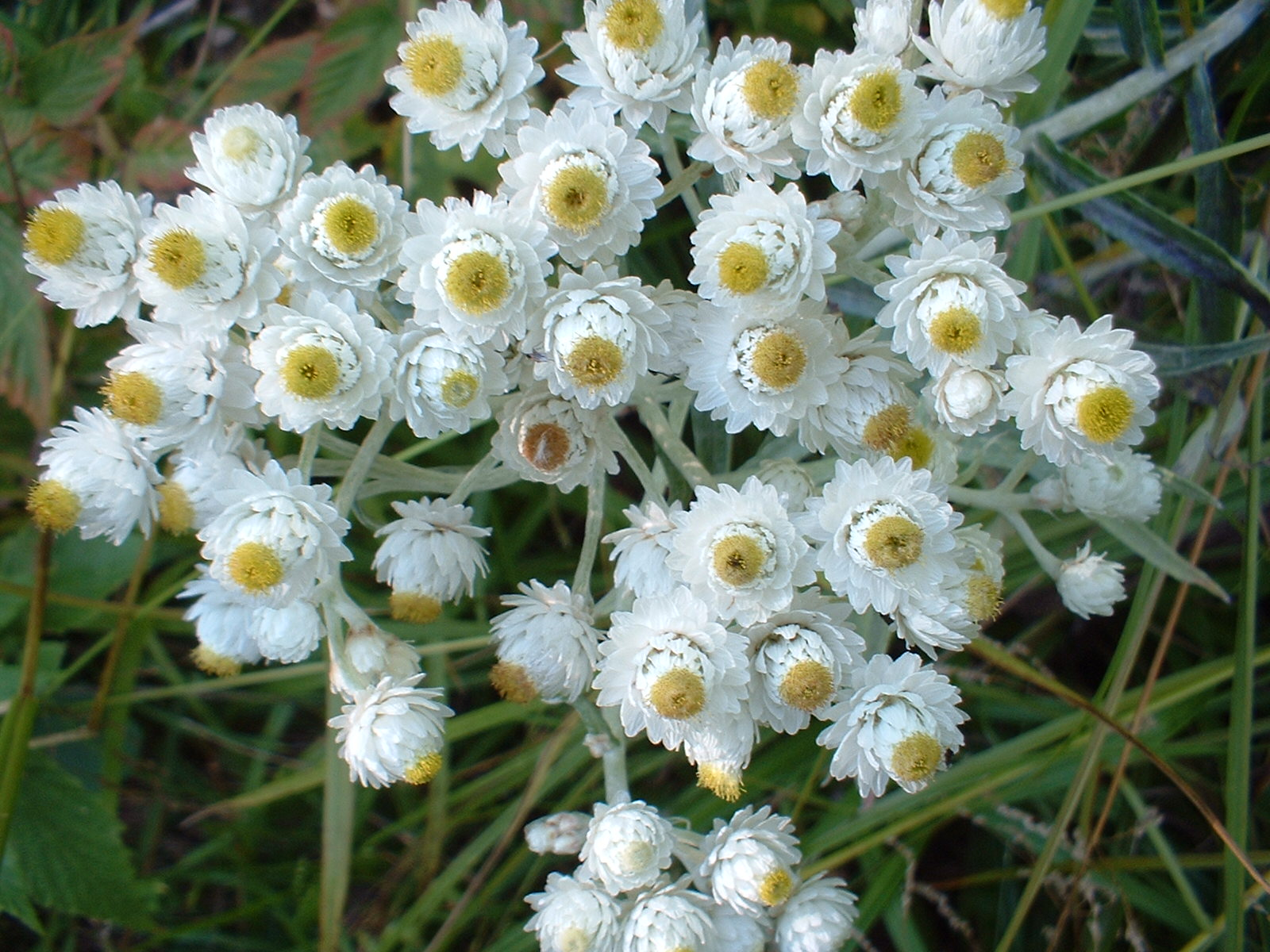
- Anaphalis margaritacea

Scientific classification
- Kingdom: Plantae
- Clade: Embryophytes
- Clade: Tracheophytes
- Clade: Spermatophytes
- Clade: Angiosperms
- Clade: Eudicots
- Clade: Asterids
- Order: Asterales
- Family: Asteraceae
- Subfamily: Asteroideae
- Tribe: Gnaphalieae
- Genus: Anaphalis; DC. (1838)

Type species
- Anaphalis nubigena DC.

Synonyms
- Margaripes (DC.) DC. ex Steud.; Antennaria sect. Margaripes DC.; Gnaphalium subsect. Margaripes (DC.) Miq.; Gnaphalium sect. Anaphalis (DC.) Miq.

= Anaphalis =

Pearly everlasting

Genus of flowering plants

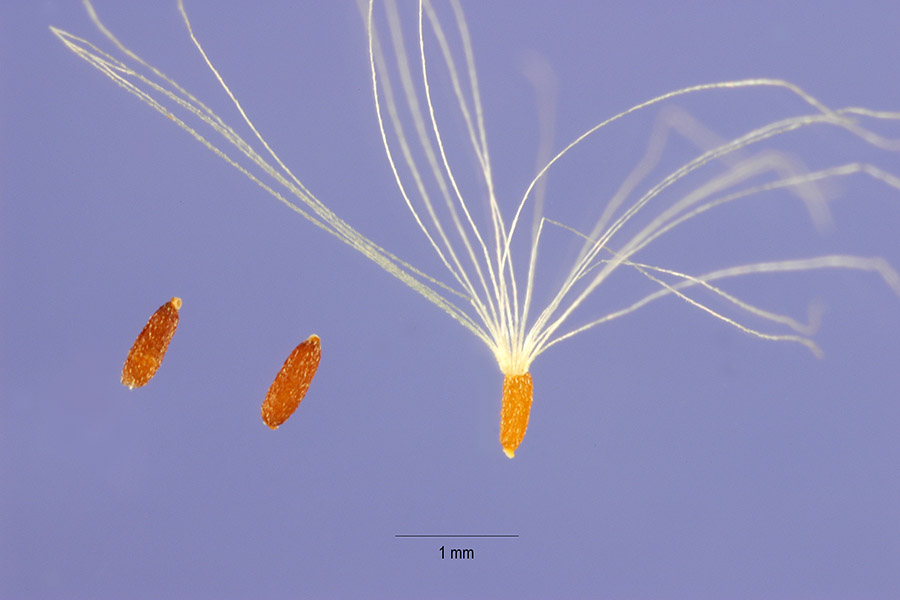
Achenes

Anaphalis is a genus of herbaceous and woody flowering plants within the family Asteraceae, whose members are commonly known by the name pearl or pearly everlasting. There are around 110 species with the vast majority being native to central and southern Asia. There is one species native to North America that is fairly well known and popular in cultivation, namely the western pearly everlasting (Anaphalis margaritacea).

The name probably derives from the common practice of drying the flowers and stems for decorations through winter months. This plant was used extensively by Native Americans for a variety of medicinal purposes.

Two of the species, A. javanica and A. longifolia can be found on mountainsides on the Island of Java in Indonesia. Anaphalis javanica, also known as the Javanese Edelweiss, is currently an endangered species.

Species

- Anaphalis acutifolia Hand.-Mazz.
- Anaphalis adnata Wall. ex DC.
- Anaphalis alpicola Makino
- Anaphalis araneosa DC.
- Anaphalis arfakensis Mattf.
- Anaphalis aristata (DC.) DC.
- Anaphalis aureopunctata Lingelsh. & Borza
- Anaphalis barnesii C.E.C.Fisch.
- Anaphalis batangensis Y.L.Chen
- Anaphalis beddomei Hook.f.
- Anaphalis bicolor (Franch.) Diels
- Anaphalis boissieri Georgiadou
- Anaphalis brevifolia DC.
- Anaphalis bulleyana (Jeffrey) C.C.Chang
- Anaphalis busua (Buch.-Ham.) DC.
- Anaphalis candollei Georgiadou
- Anaphalis cavei Chatterjee
- Anaphalis chilensis Reiche
- Anaphalis chlamydophylla Diels
- Anaphalis chungtienensis Y.L.Chen
- Anaphalis cinerascens Ling & W.Wang
- Anaphalis contorta (D.Don) Hook.f.
- Anaphalis contortiformis Hand.-Mazz.
- Anaphalis cooperi Grierson & Spring.
- Anaphalis corymbifera C.C.Chang
- Anaphalis cuneifolia (DC.) Hook.f.
- Anaphalis cutchica C.B.Clarke
- Anaphalis darvasica Boriss.
- Anaphalis delavayi (Franch.) Diels
- Anaphalis depauperata Boriss.
- Anaphalis deserti J.R.Drumm.
- Anaphalis elegans Ling
- Anaphalis flaccida Ling
- Anaphalis flavescens Hand.-Mazz.
- Anaphalis fruticosa Hook.f.
- Anaphalis garanica Boriss.
- Anaphalis gracilis Hand.-Mazz.
- Anaphalis griffithii Hook.f.
- Anaphalis hancockii Maxim.
- Anaphalis hellwigii Warb.
- Anaphalis himachalensis Aswal & Goel
- Anaphalis hondae Kitam.
- Anaphalis hookeri C.B.Clarke
- Anaphalis horaimontana Masam.
- Anaphalis hymenolepis Ling
- Anaphalis javanica (DC.) Sch.Bip.
- Anaphalis kashmiriana P.C.Pant, R.R.Rao & G.Arti
- Anaphalis kokonorica (Y.Ling) Grubov
- Anaphalis lactea Maxim.
- Anaphalis larium Hand.-Mazz.
- Anaphalis latialata Ling & Y.L.Chen
- Anaphalis latifolia Kinzik. & Vainberg
- Anaphalis lawii (Hook.f.) Gamble
- Anaphalis leptophylla (DC.) DC.
- Anaphalis likiangensis (Franch.) Y.Ling
- Anaphalis longifolia (Blume) Blume ex DC.
- Anaphalis marcescens (Wight) C.B.Clarke
- Anaphalis margaritacea (L.) Benth. & Hook.f.
- Anaphalis margaritaceae L.
- Anaphalis maxima (Kuntze) Steenis
- Anaphalis meeboldii W.W.Sm.
- Anaphalis morrisonicola Hayata
- Anaphalis mucronata C.B.Clarke ex Hemsl.
- Anaphalis muliensis (Hand.-Mazz.) Hand.-Mazz.
- Anaphalis nagasawai Hayata
- Anaphalis neelgerryana (DC.) DC.
- Anaphalis nepalensis (Spreng.) Hand.-Mazz.
- Anaphalis notoniana (DC.) DC.
- Anaphalis nubigena DC.
- Anaphalis oxyphylla Ling & C.Shih
- Anaphalis pachylaena Y.L.Chen & Ling
- Anaphalis pannosa Hand.-Mazz.
- Anaphalis patentifolia Rech.f.
- Anaphalis pedicellatum T.Anderson
- Anaphalis pelliculata Trimen
- Anaphalis plicata Kitam.
- Anaphalis porphyrolepis Ling & Y.L.Chen
- Anaphalis pseudocinnamomea Grierson
- Anaphalis racemifera Franch.
- Anaphalis rhododactyla W.W.Sm.
- Anaphalis roseoalba Krasch.
- Anaphalis royleana DC.
- Anaphalis sahyadrica S.Remya, K.M.P.Kumar & May
- Anaphalis sarawschanica (C.Winkl.) B.Fedtsch.
- Anaphalis saxatilis (DC.) Boerl.
- Anaphalis scopulosa Boriss.
- Anaphalis sinica Hance
- Anaphalis souliei Diels
- Anaphalis spodiophylla Ling & Y.L.Chen
- Anaphalis staintonii Georgiadou
- Anaphalis stenocephala Ling & C.Shih
- Anaphalis subdecurrens (DC.) Gamble
- Anaphalis subtilis Kinzik. & Vainberg
- Anaphalis subumbellata C.B.Clarke
- Anaphalis suffruticosa Hand.-Mazz.
- Anaphalis sulphurea (Trimen) Grierson
- Anaphalis surculosa (Hand.-Mazz.) Hand.-Mazz.
- Anaphalis szechuanensis Ling & Y.L.Chen
- Anaphalis tenuicaulis Boriss.
- Anaphalis tenuisissima C.C.Chang
- Anaphalis thwaitesii C.B.Clarke
- Anaphalis tibetica Kitam.
- Anaphalis transnokoensis Sasaki
- Anaphalis travancorica W.W.Sm.
- Anaphalis triplinervis (Sims) Sims ex C.B.Clarke
- Anaphalis velutina Krasch.
- Anaphalis virens C.C.Chang
- Anaphalis virgata Thomson
- Anaphalis viridis Cummins
- Anaphalis viscida (Blume) DC.
- Anaphalis wightiana (Wall ex DC.) DC.
- Anaphalis xylorhiza Sch.Bip. ex Hook.f.
- Anaphalis yangii Y.L.Chen & Y.L.Lin
- Anaphalis yunnanensis (Franch.) Diels
- Anaphalis zeylanica C.B.Clarke
