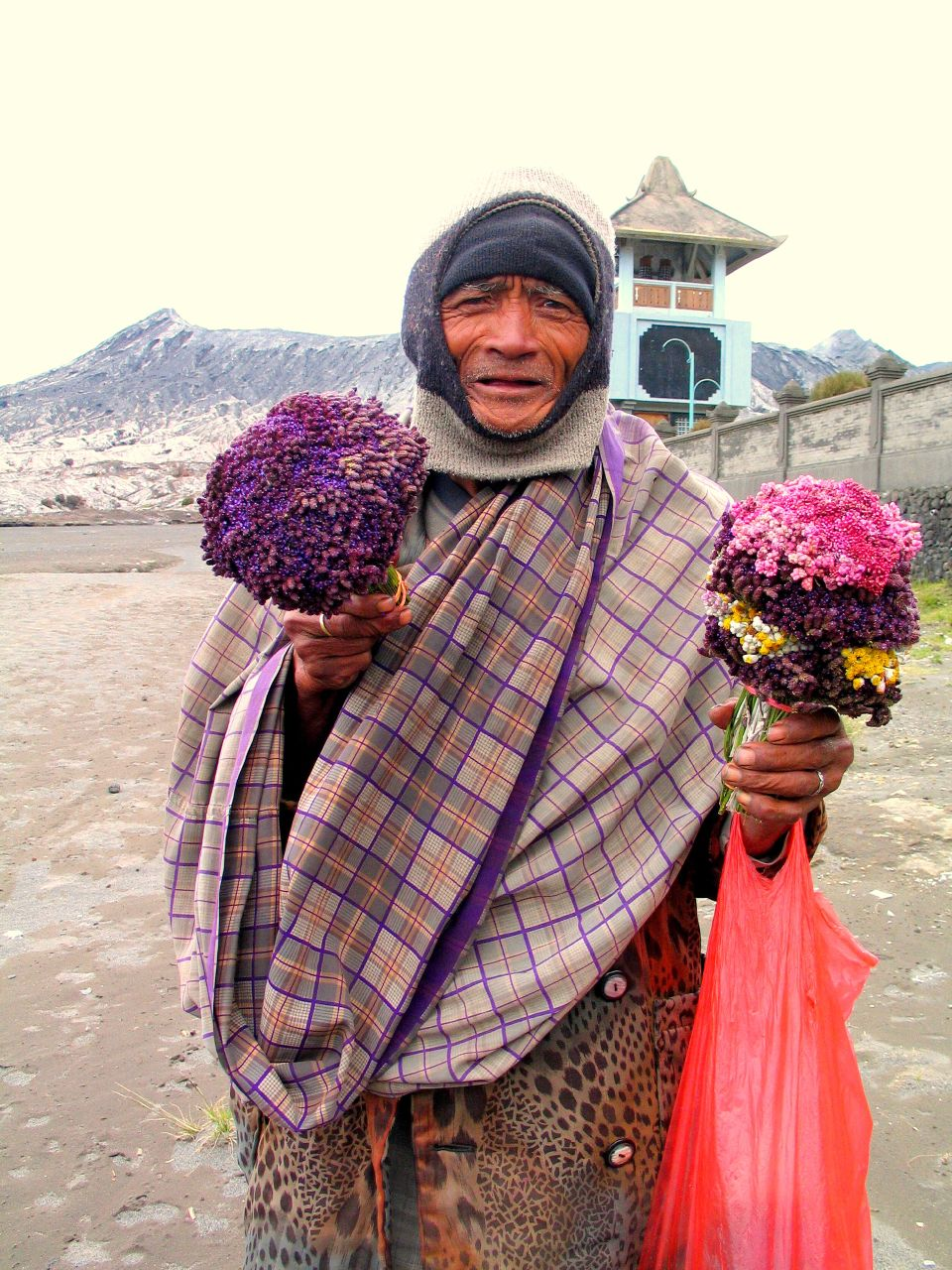
- A person selling Anaphalis javanica (Javanese edelweiss) on Mount Bromo.

Scientific classification
- Kingdom: Plantae
- Clade: Tracheophytes
- Clade: Angiosperms
- Clade: Eudicots
- Clade: Asterids
- Order: Asterales
- Family: Asteraceae
- Genus: Anaphalis
- Species: A. javanica

Binomial name
- Anaphalis javanica (Reinw. ex Blume) DC.

Synonyms
- Gnaphalium javanicum Reinw. ex Blume

= Anaphalis javanica =

Species of flowering plant

Anaphalis javanica, the Javanese edelweiss, is a species of flowering plant native to Indonesia. It is found mostly in mountainous regions of Java, southern Sumatra, southern Sulawesi and Lombok. Although a mature plant can reach eight metres in height, most specimens are less than a metre tall. It is a pioneer in recent volcanic land. The flowers are generally seen between April and August. A bird species, the Javan whistling thrush (Myophonus glaucinus), nests in the plant's branches.

== Threats ==
Known as bunga abadi in Indonesian (lit. 'eternal flower'), senduro (ꦱꦼꦤ꧀ꦝꦸꦫ sêndhurå) in Javanese or tanalayu (ꦠꦤꦭꦪꦸ, 'never wilts') among the Tenggerese, this plant is popular among tourists. Dried flowers are often sold as souvenirs. This could lead to the destruction of the wild-grown species. In the Bromo-Tengger region in East Java, this plant is considered extinct. This species is constantly decreasing in number and is currently protected in Gunung Gede Pangrango National Park.

The plant has been protected under Indonesian law since 1990.

== Gallery ==
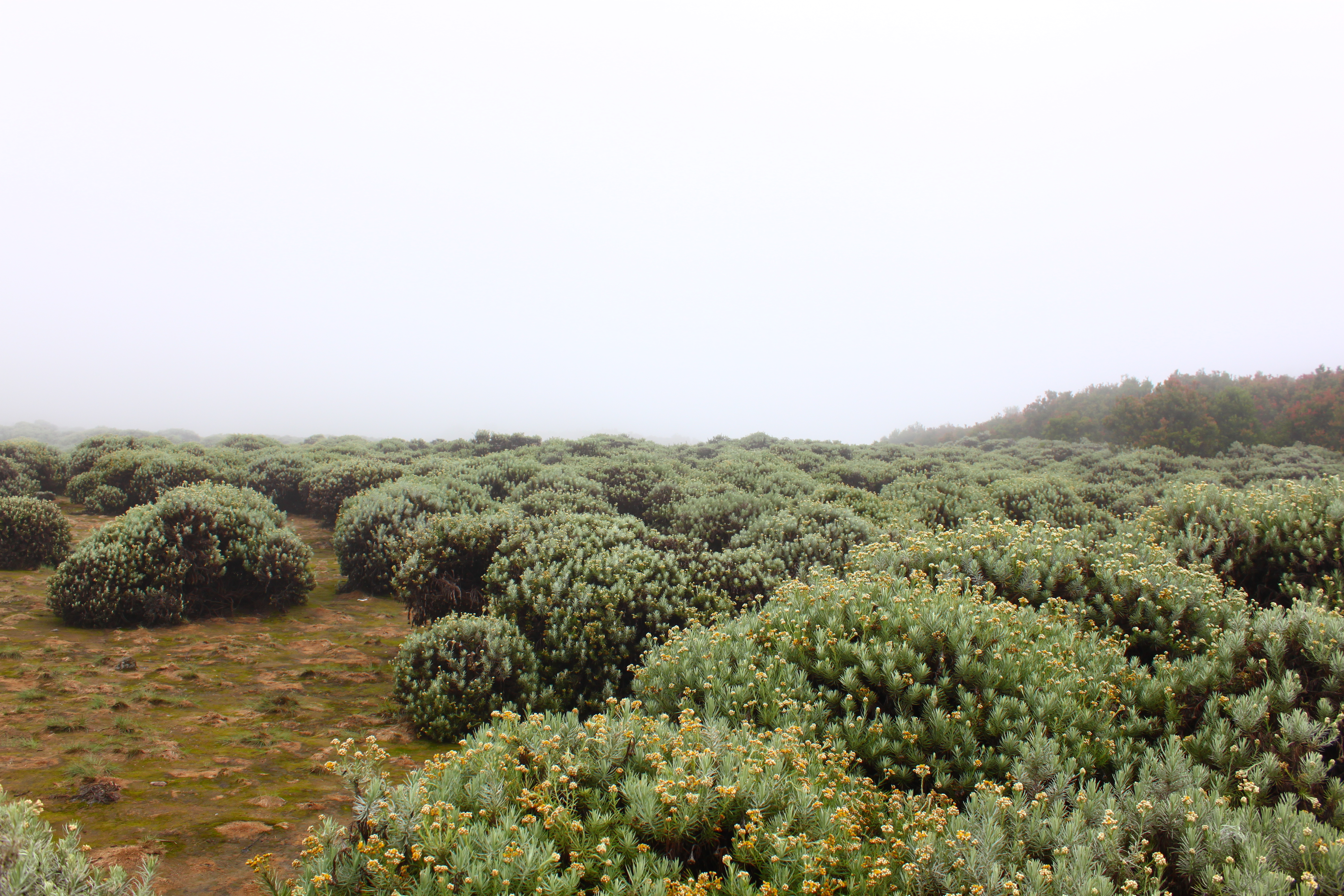
Javanese edelweiss field on Mount Papandayan

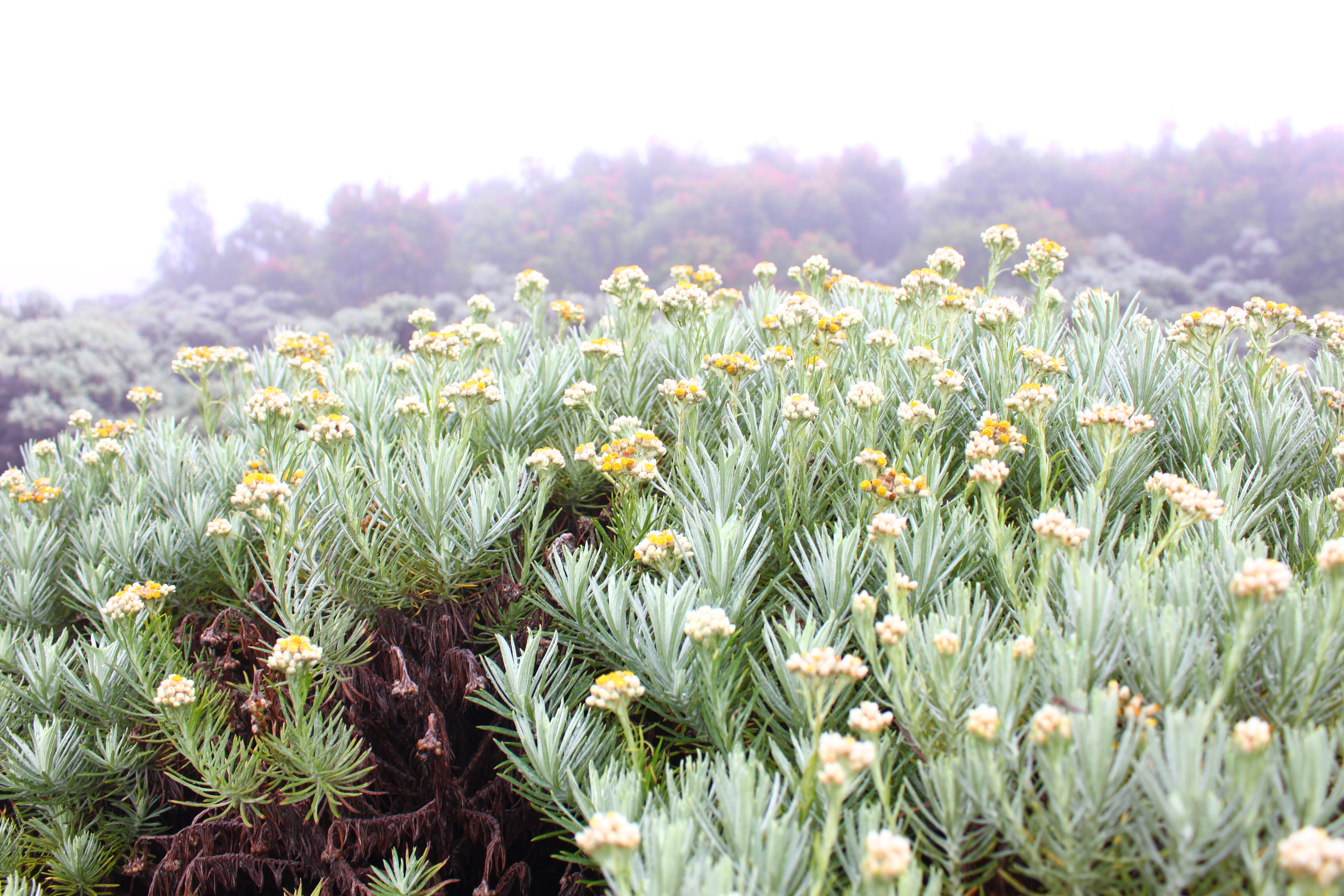
Javanese edelweiss

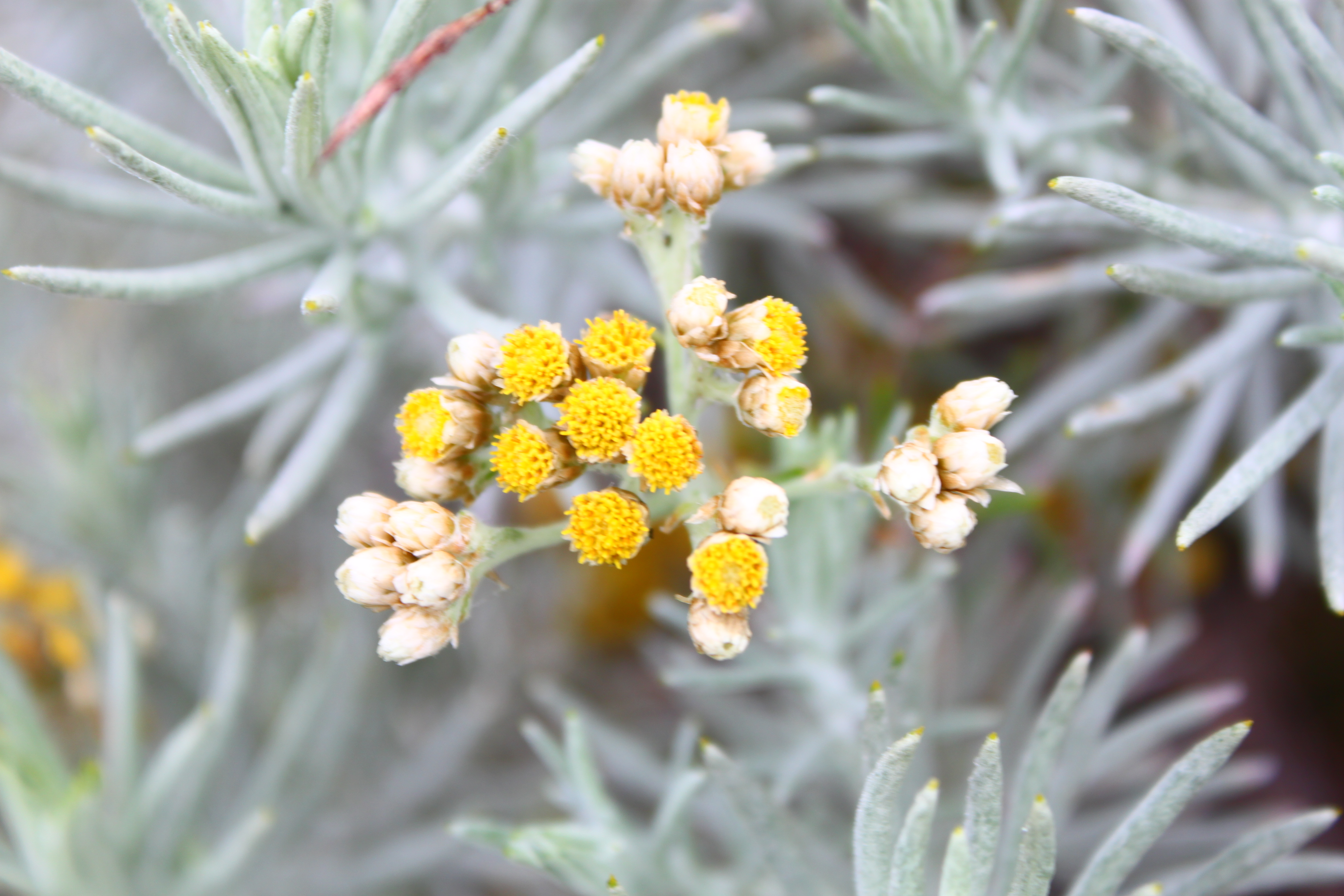
A close-up of a Javanese edelweiss flower
