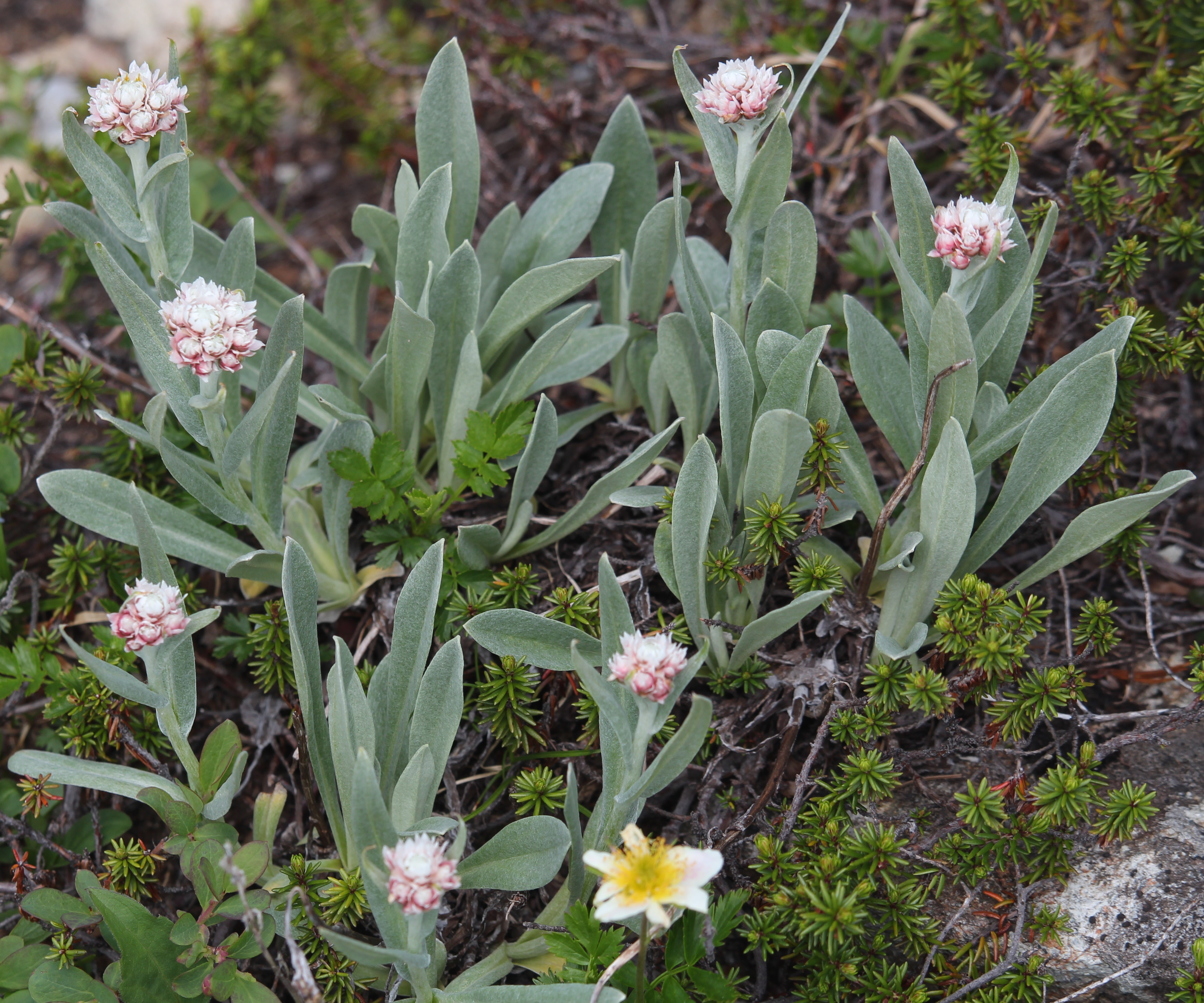

Scientific classification
- Kingdom: Plantae
- Clade: Tracheophytes
- Clade: Angiosperms
- Clade: Eudicots
- Clade: Asterids
- Order: Asterales
- Family: Asteraceae
- Genus: Anaphalis
- Species: A. alpicola

Binomial name
- Anaphalis alpicola Makino

Synonyms
- Anaphalis alpicola f. robusta H.Hara

= Anaphalis alpicola =

Species of flowering plant

Anaphalis alpicola is a species of flowering plant within the family Asteraceae. It is endemic to Japan (Hokkaido, Honshu).
