= Anaphalis beddomei =

Scientific classification
- Kingdom: Plantae
- Clade: Tracheophytes
- Clade: Angiosperms
- Clade: Eudicots
- Clade: Asterids
- Order: Asterales
- Family: Asteraceae
- Genus: Anaphalis
- Species: A. beddomei

Binomial name
- Anaphalis beddomei Hook.f.

Species of flowering plant

Anaphalis beddomei is a shrubby flowering plant within the Asteraceae family.

== Distribution ==
Kerala and Tamil Nadu.
