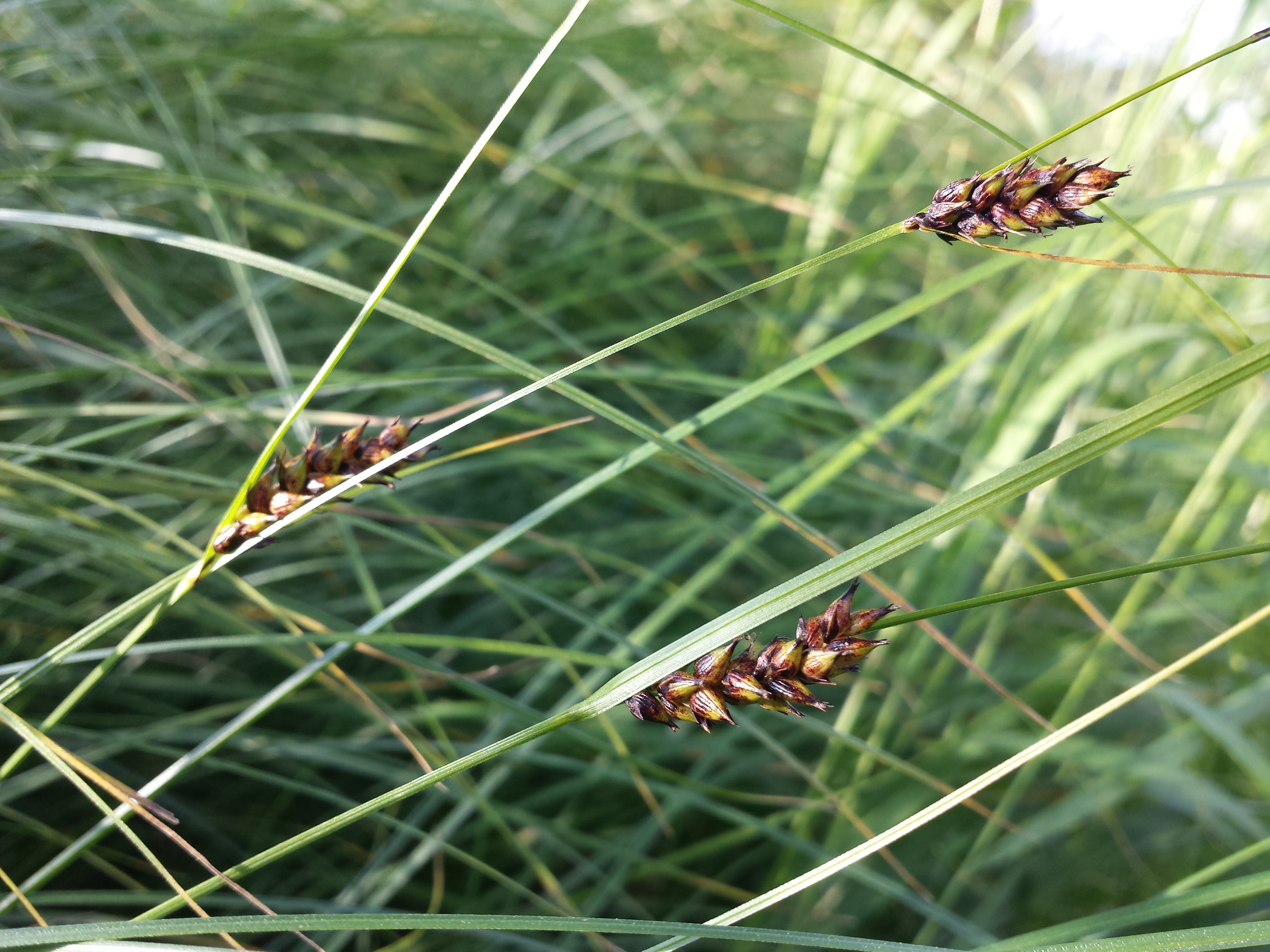
- In Vienna, Austria

Scientific classification
- Kingdom: Plantae
- Clade: Tracheophytes
- Clade: Angiosperms
- Clade: Monocots
- Clade: Commelinids
- Order: Poales
- Family: Cyperaceae
- Genus: Carex
- Species: C. melanostachya

Binomial name
- Carex melanostachya M.Bieb. ex Willd.

Synonyms
- List: Carex bicuspidata Regel ex V.I.Krecz.; Carex bornmulleri Kük.; Carex juncoides J.Presl & C.Presl; Carex ledebourii Boiss. & Buhse; Carex nutans Host; Carex ripariiformis Litv.; Carex sulcata Schur; Vignea juncoides (J.Presl & C.Presl) Opiz

= Carex melanostachya =

Species of grass-like plant

Carex melanostachya, called the Great Plains sedge, is a species of flowering plant in the genus Carex, native to central Europe to western Asia, and introduced to the central US. Its chromosome number is 2n=54, with some uncertainty.
