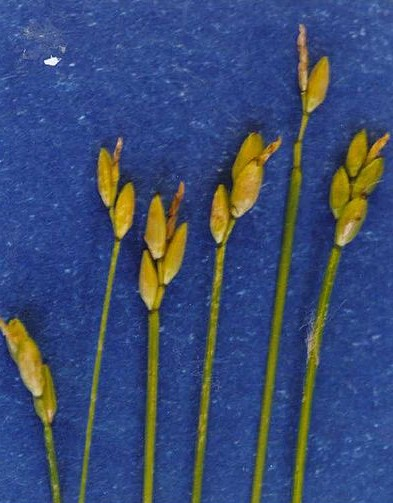

Conservation status
- Least Concern (IUCN 3.1)

Scientific classification
- Kingdom: Plantae
- Clade: Tracheophytes
- Clade: Angiosperms
- Clade: Monocots
- Clade: Commelinids
- Order: Poales
- Family: Cyperaceae
- Genus: Carex
- Species: C. leptalea

Binomial name
- Carex leptalea Wahlenb.

Synonyms
- Carex microstachys; Carex polytrichoides; Carex harperi

= Carex leptalea =

Species of grass-like plant

Carex leptalea is a species of sedge known by the common names bristly-stalked sedge and flaccid sedge. It is native to much of North America including most of Canada, the Dominican Republic, and the United States. It only grows in wetlands. This sedge produces dense clusters of thin stems up to 70 centimeters tall from a network of branching rhizomes. The thin, deep green leaves are soft, hairless, and sometimes drooping. The inflorescence is up to 16 millimeters long but only 2 to 3 millimeters wide, and is yellow-green in color. There are only a few perigynia on each spikelet, and they are green and veined.

Subspecies

1. Carex leptalea subsp. harperi (Fernald) W.Stone - southeastern US from Texas and Florida north to Missouri and Pennsylvania
2. Carex leptalea subsp. leptalea - widespread from Alaska east to Nunavut and south to California and Dominican Republic
3. Carex leptalea subsp. pacifica Calder & Roy L.Taylor - Washington State, British Columbia, southeastern Alaska
