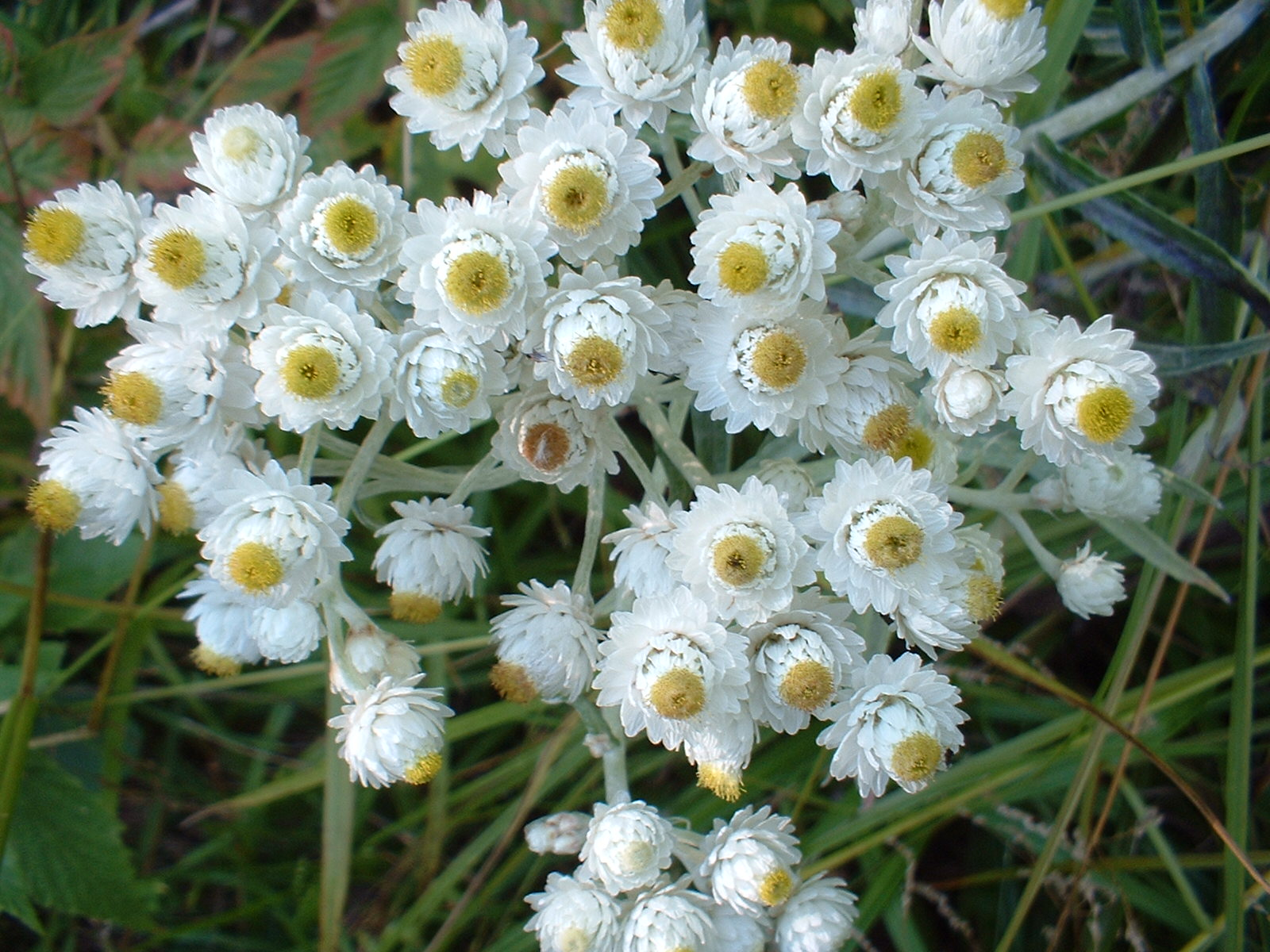
- Corymb of capitula

Conservation status
- Secure (NatureServe)

Scientific classification
- Kingdom: Plantae
- Clade: Tracheophytes
- Clade: Angiosperms
- Clade: Eudicots
- Clade: Asterids
- Order: Asterales
- Family: Asteraceae
- Genus: Anaphalis
- Species: A. margaritacea

Binomial name
- Anaphalis margaritacea (L.) Benth. & Hook.f. (1873) Sources: NatureServe, IPNI, GRIN

Synonyms
- Synonymy: Anaphalis angustifolia Rydb.; Anaphalis cinnamomea (DC.) C.B.Clarke; Anaphalis japonica Maxim.; Anaphalis lanata (A.Nelson) Rydb.; Anaphalis occidentalis (Greene) A.Heller; Anaphalis sierrae A.Heller; Anaphalis subalpina (A.Gray) Rydb.; Anaphalis timmua D.Don; Anaphalis timmua (Buch.-Ham. ex D.Don) Hand.-Mazz.; Anaphalis yedoensis Maxim.; Antennaria cinnamomea DC.; Antennaria margaritacea (L.) R.Br. ex DC.; Antennaria margaritacea (L.) Sweet; Antennaria plantaginea Sweet; Antennaria timmua Buch.-Ham. ex D.Don; Chamaezelum margaritaceum Link; Gnaphalium americanum Greene 1894 not Mill. 1768; Gnaphalium hypophaeum Spreng. ex DC.; Gnaphalium margaritaceum L.; Gnaphalium timmua Buch.-Ham. ex Spreng.; Gnaphalium wightianum Thwaites; Helichrysum margaritaceum (L.) Moench; Antennaria japonica Sch.Bip.; Gnaphalium yedoense Franch. & Sav.

= Anaphalis margaritacea =

Species of flowering plant

Anaphalis margaritacea, commonly known as the western pearly everlasting or pearly everlasting, is an Asian and North American species of flowering perennial plant in the family Asteraceae.

== Description ==
A. margaritacea grows erect up to about 90 centimetres (3 feet) tall, with narrow, alternate leaves up to 12.5 cm (5 inches). The undersides of the leaves are densely covered in tiny hairs. The stems are dry and brittle. The whitish to yellowish flower grows to about 6 millimetres (1/4 in) across as part of a corymb inflorescence, the most conspicuous part of which is the numerous pearly white bracts that surround the disc florets. It blooms between June and September.

The plant is dioecious, meaning the pollen-producing (male) and seed-producing (female) flowers are borne on separate plants.

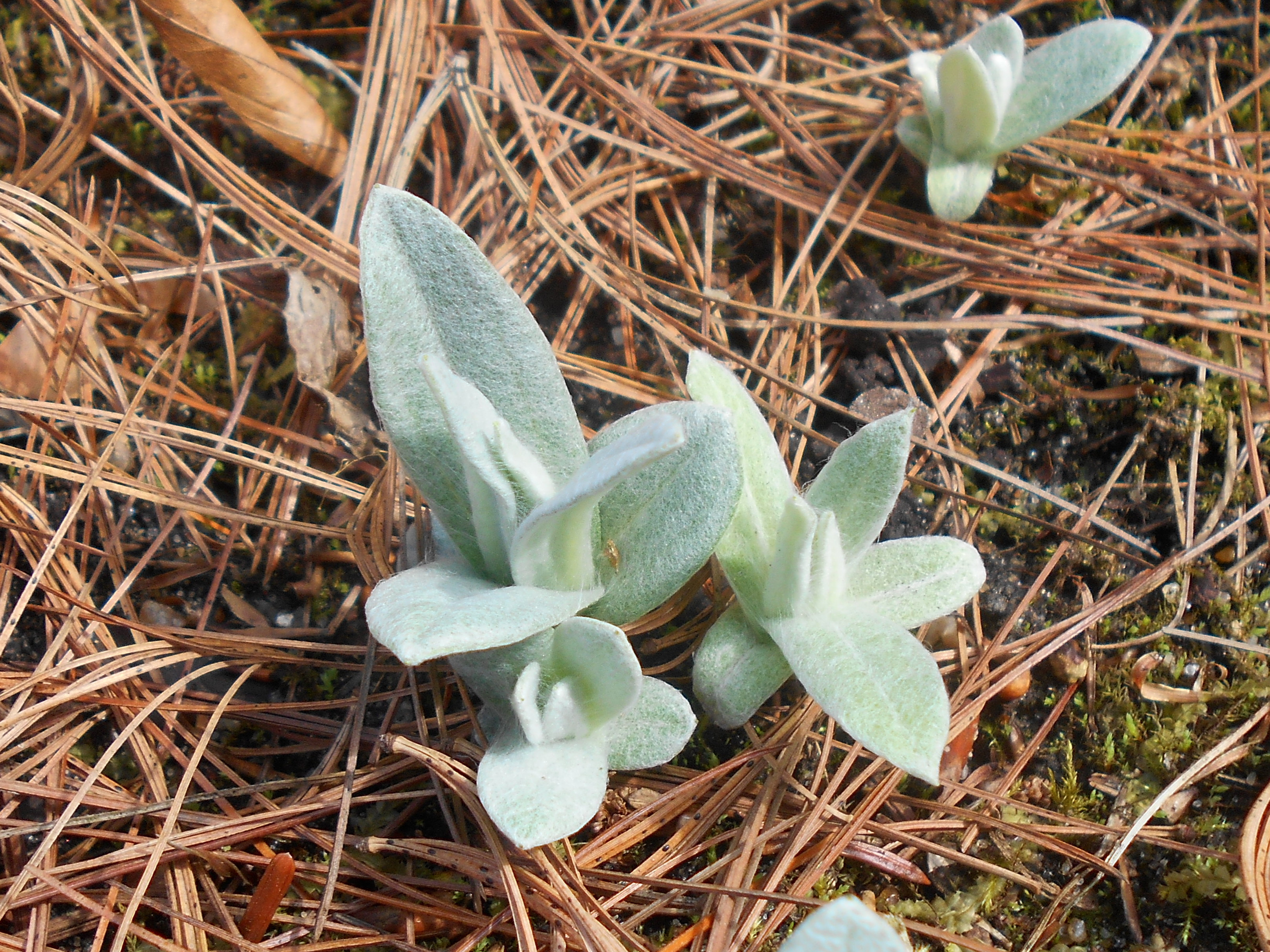
Young plants

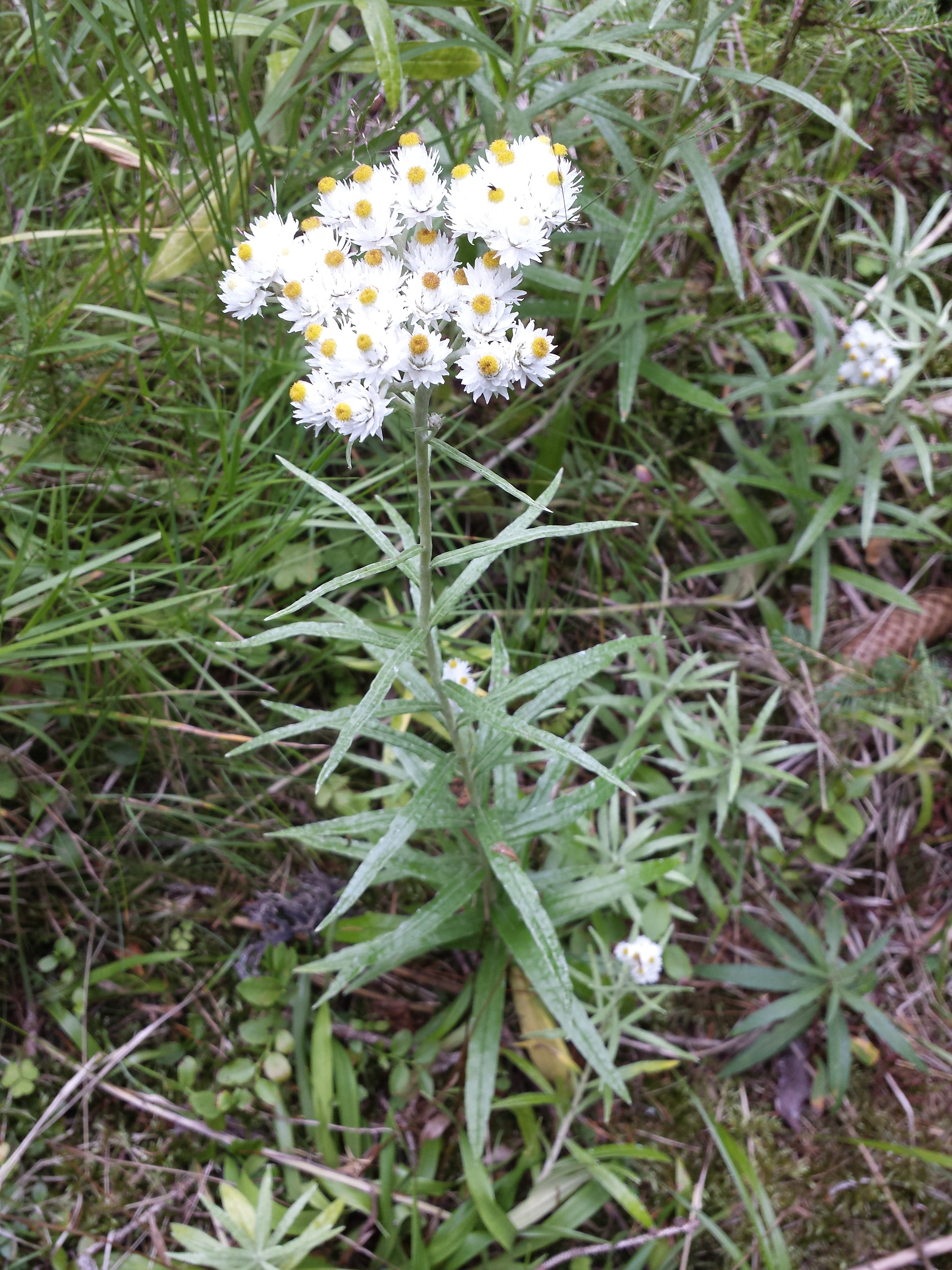
Plant habit

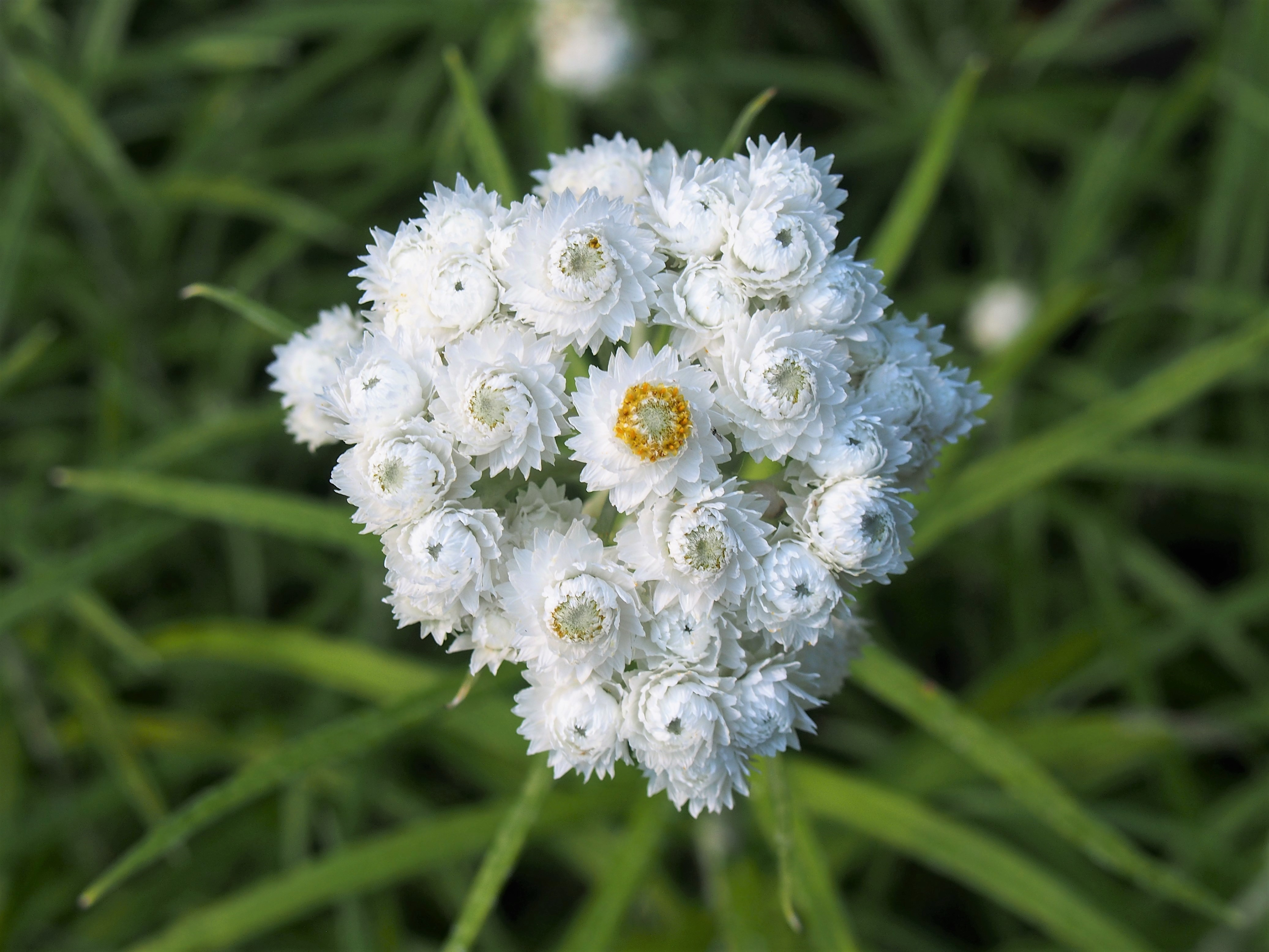
Flowers with pearly white bracts

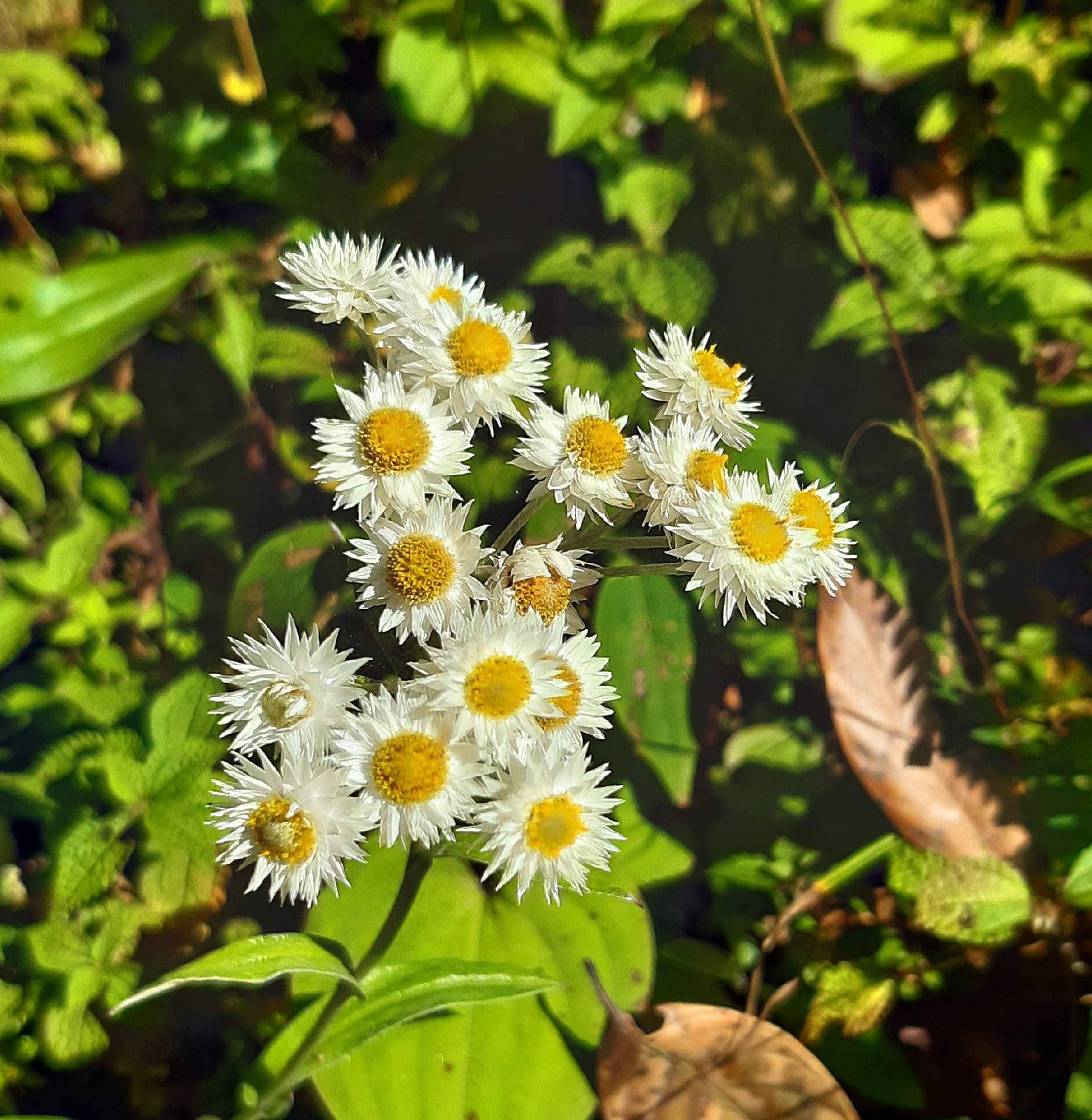
In the Himalayas, Sikkim, India

== Taxonomy ==
Varieties and subspecies

- Anaphalis margaritacea var. cinnamomea (DC.) Herder ex Maxim.
- Anaphalis margaritacea subsp. japonica (Maxim.) Kitam.
- Anaphalis margaritacea var. margaritacea
- Anaphalis margaritacea var. yedoensis (Franch. & Sav.) Ohwi

=== Etymology ===
The species' common name 'pearly everlasting' comes from the pearly white bracts.

== Distribution and habitat ==
It is widespread across most of Canada and the United States, as well as northwestern Mexico. Asian populations are found in China, the Russian Far East, Japan, Korea, northern Indochina, and the Himalayas. The species is reportedly naturalized in Europe though not native there. It prefers dry, sunny climates, but is hardy to temperatures well below freezing.

== Ecology ==
The leaves are host to the caterpillars of the American painted lady butterfly (Vanessa virginiensis) and the painted lady butterfly (Vanessa cardui).

== Cultivation ==
Western pearly everlasting is sometimes grown by gardeners for its attractive foliage and modestly beautiful white blooms. They prefer a well drained soil, somewhat sandy and dry and with less organic matter. At least part sun conditions, if not full sun, are required for them to grow successfully. They can become somewhat aggressive spreaders in optimal conditions.

== Uses ==
The flowering stems of western pearly everlasting can be dried and the fluffy flower heads are used in dried flower arrangements. The leaves and young plants are edible when cooked.
