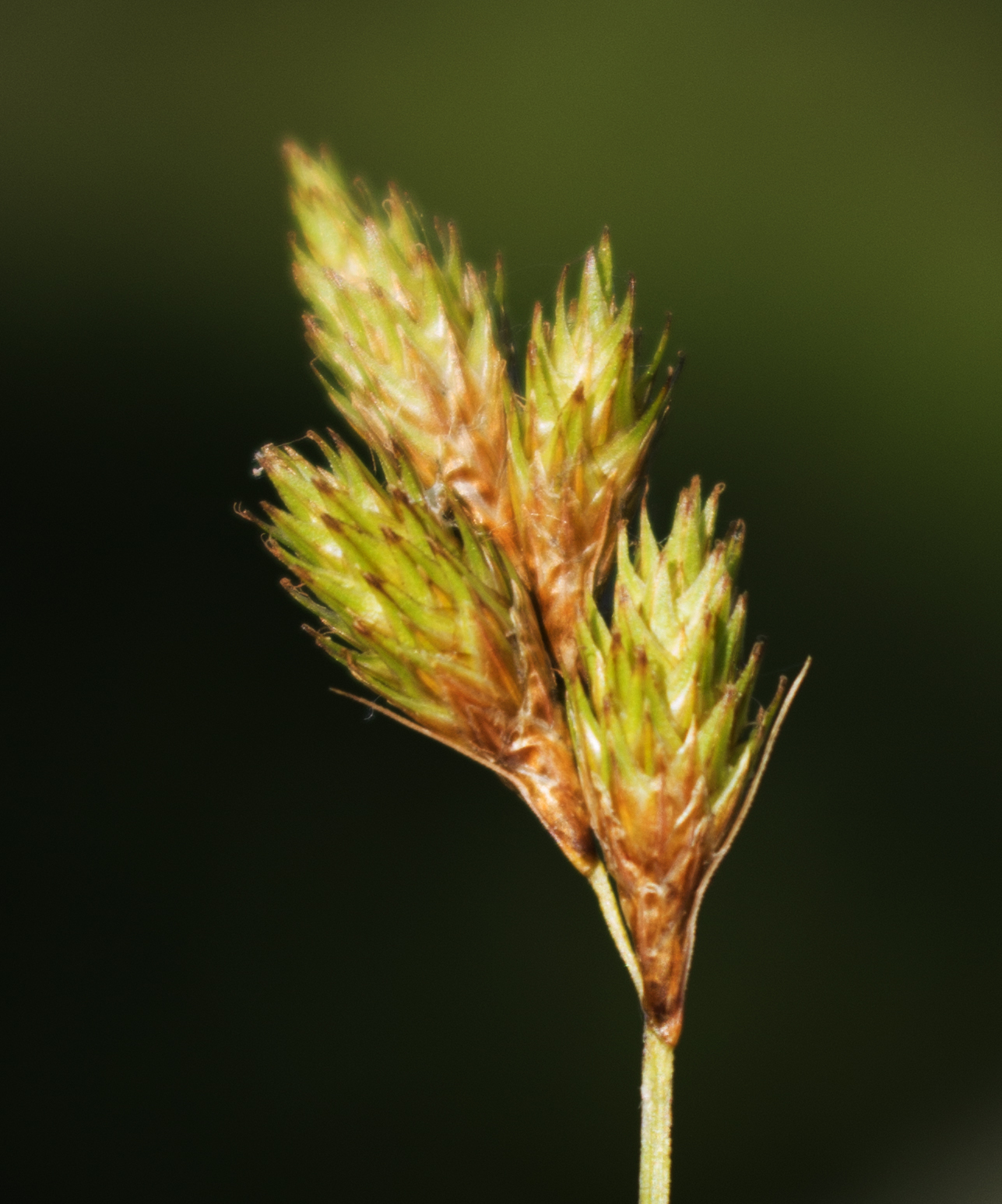

Scientific classification
- Kingdom: Plantae
- Clade: Tracheophytes
- Clade: Angiosperms
- Clade: Monocots
- Clade: Commelinids
- Order: Poales
- Family: Cyperaceae
- Genus: Carex
- Subgenus: Carex subg. Vignea
- Section: Carex sect. Ovales
- Species: C. scoparia

Binomial name
- Carex scoparia Schkuhr ex Willd.

= Carex scoparia =

Pointed broom sedge

Species of grass-like plant

Carex scoparia is a species of sedge known by the common names broom sedge and pointed broom sedge. It should not be confused with the unrelated grass species known as "broom sedge," Andropogon virginicus.

== Distribution ==
This sedge is native to much of North America, including the southern half of Canada and most of the continental United States, from California to Maine. Carex scoparia can be found in many types of wetland habitat, from meadows to irrigation ditches, though it is adaptable to varying soils and hydrologic conditions. It is an introduced species in New Zealand and parts of Europe.

== Description ==
Carex scoparia produces dense clumps of stems 20 centimeters to one meter tall with narrow grasslike leaves up to about 30 centimeters long. The inflorescence is a cluster or open array of several bullet-shaped spikes of flowers. The spikes are light green and age to tan or brown. The fruit is covered in a sac called a perigynium which is light in color. The achene within the perigynium is ovate or elliptic.
