= Perigynium =

Structure that encloses the ovary in Carex

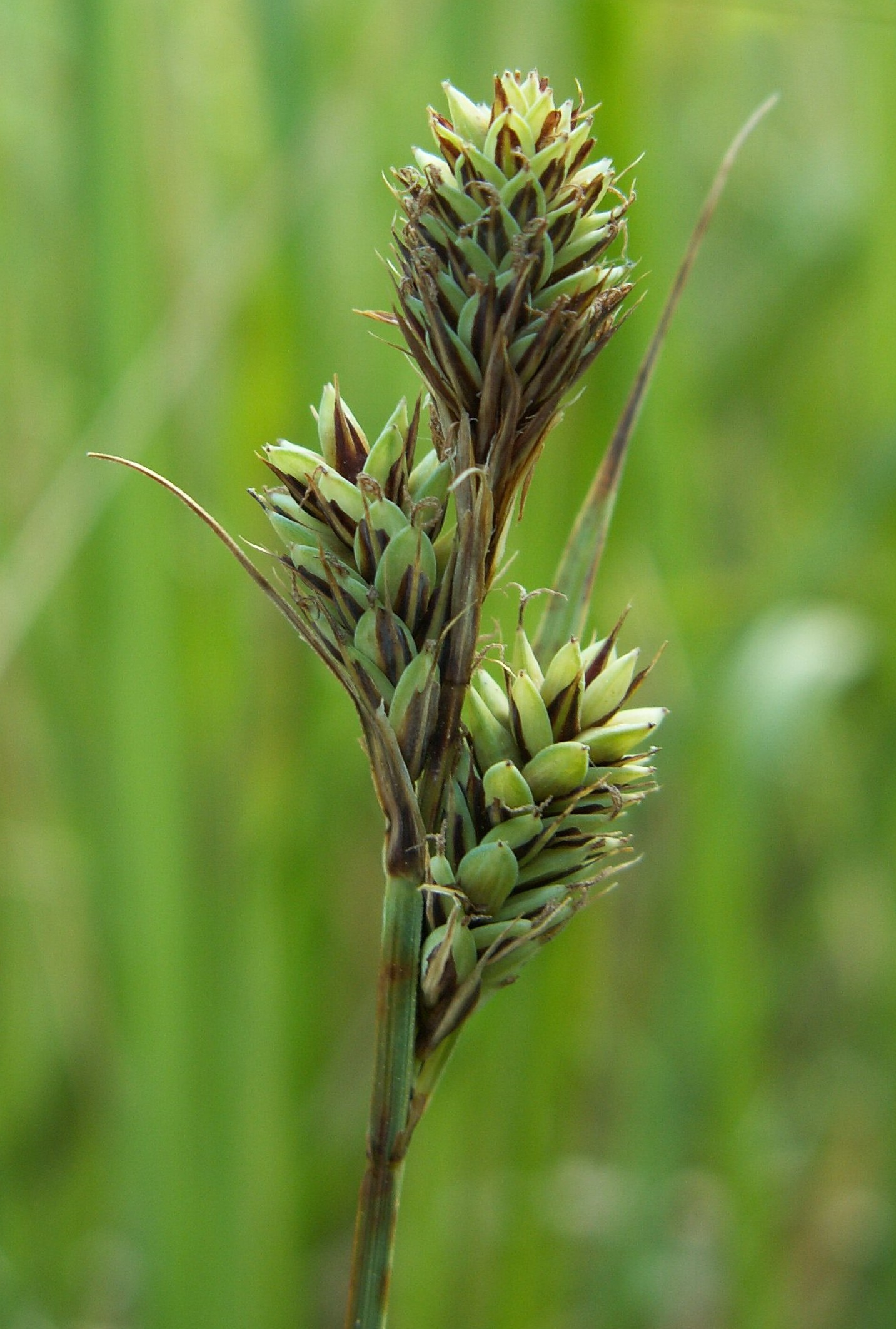
Light green perigynia with dark brown scales (Carex buxbaumii)

In botany, a perigynium (plural: perigynia), also referred to as a utricle, typically refers to a sac that surrounds the achene of plants in the genus Carex (Cyperaceae). The perigynium is a modified prophyll, also known as a glume, which is tissue of leaf origin that encloses the dry, one-seeded achene.

In liverworts, "perigynium" refers to a tube-shaped structure that encases the archegonium and the developing sporophyte.

The location, size, shape, hairiness, color, and other aspects of the perigynium are important structures for distinguishing Carex species. They are often subtended by a scale, which may also aid in identification.

== Dispersal ==
Features of the perigynium may aid in seed dispersal, such as a surface that clings to fur or skin or a shape that enables dispersion via wind or water. Seed dispersal by animals such as ants (myrmechory) has been recorded, as some species of sedges have developed elaiosomes at the base of the perigynia. Ants carry the perigynium back to the nest, use the elaiosome for food, and the seed germinates away from the parent plant.

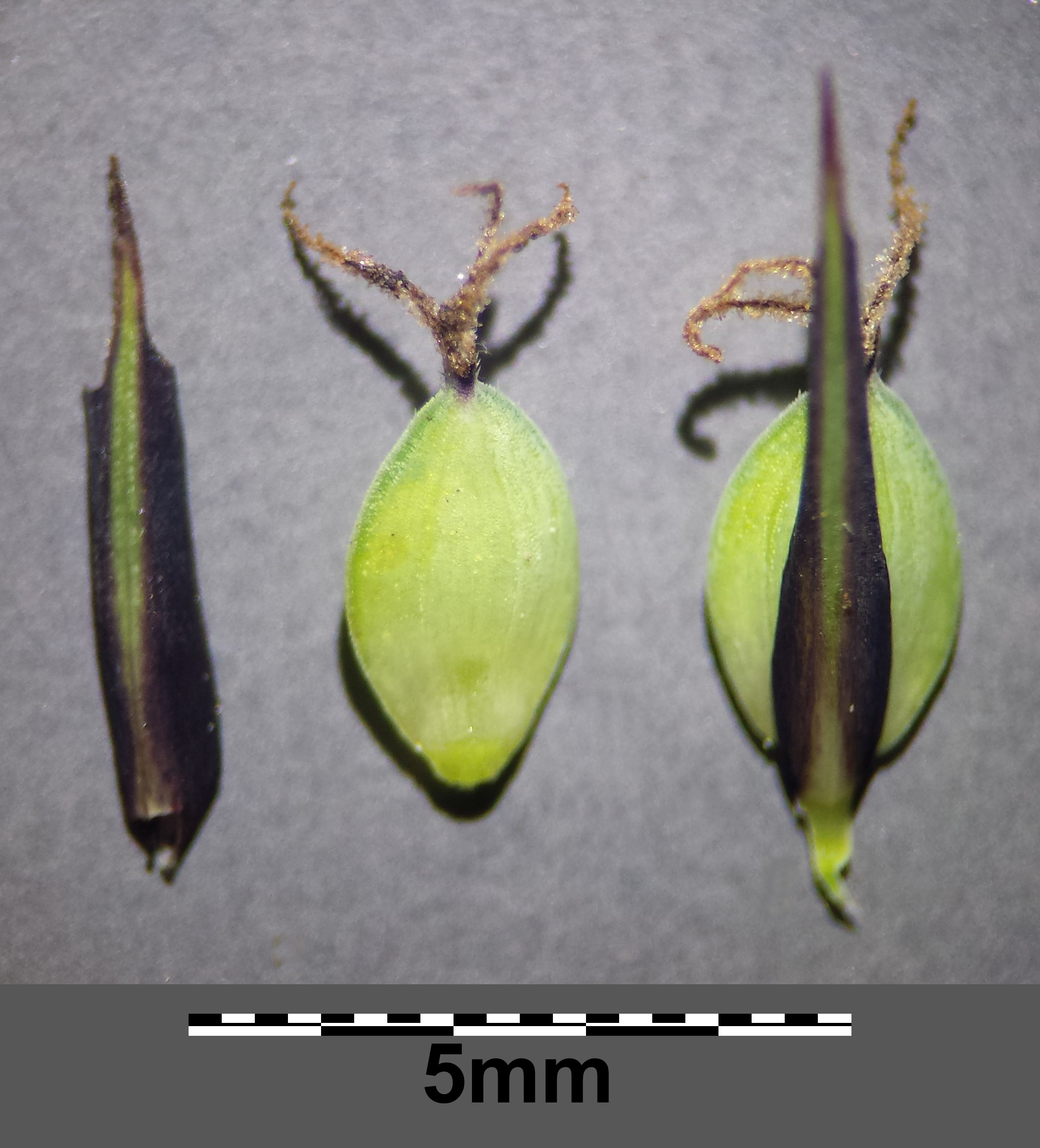
Carex buxbaumii (green perigynia in center and on right, with dark brown scales)

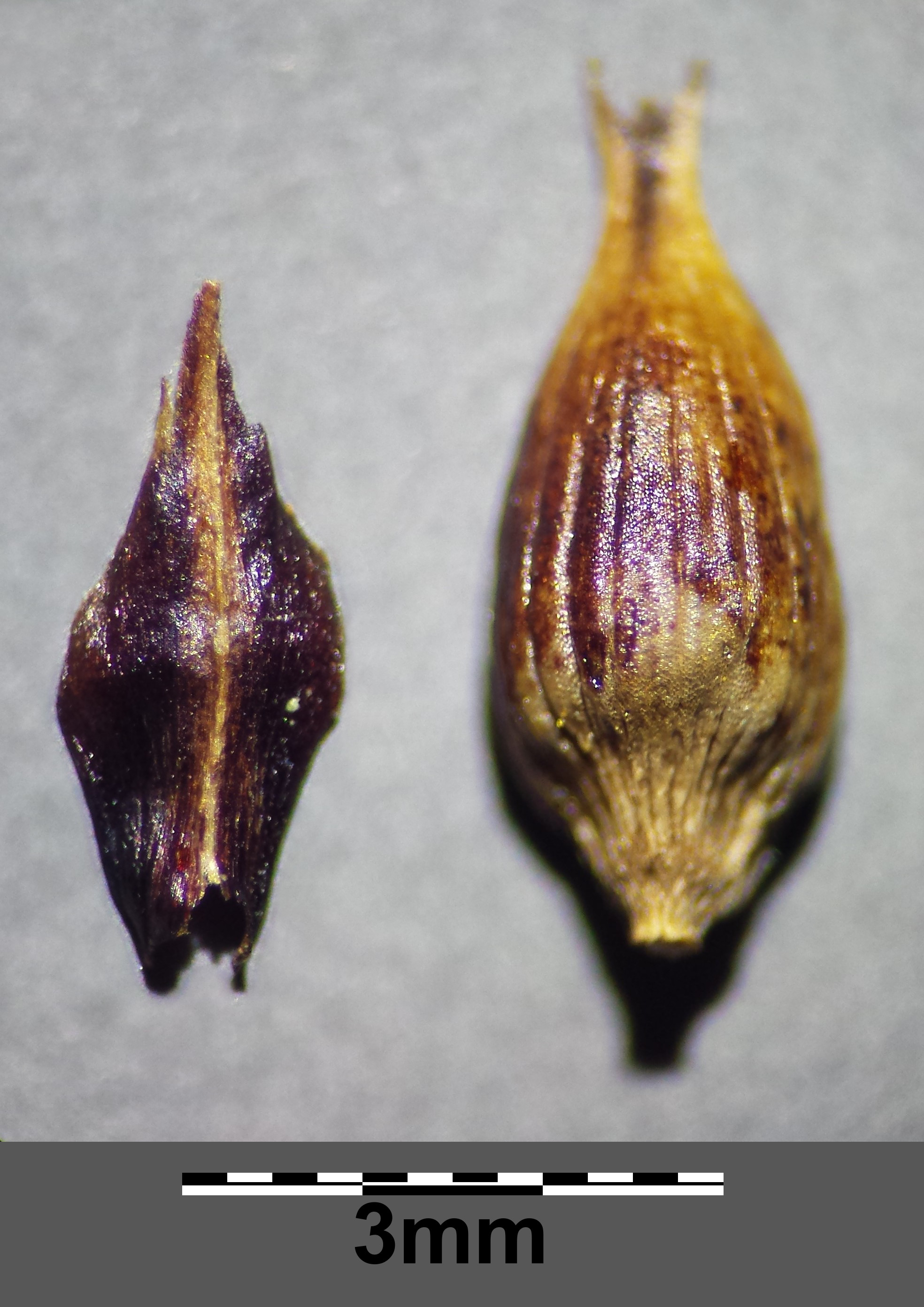
Carex melanostachya (scale on left, perigynium on right)

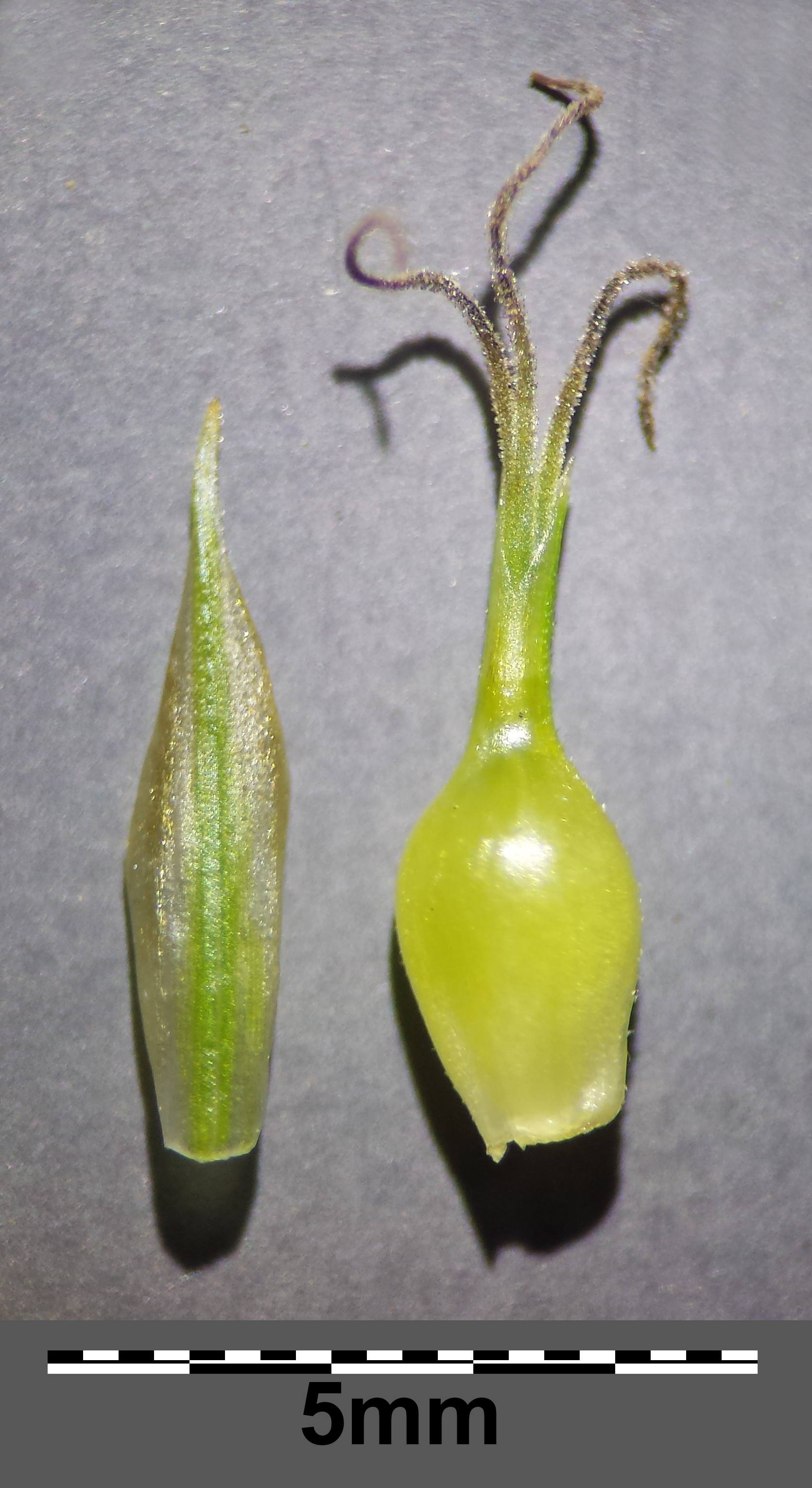
Carex michelii (scale on left, perigynium on right)

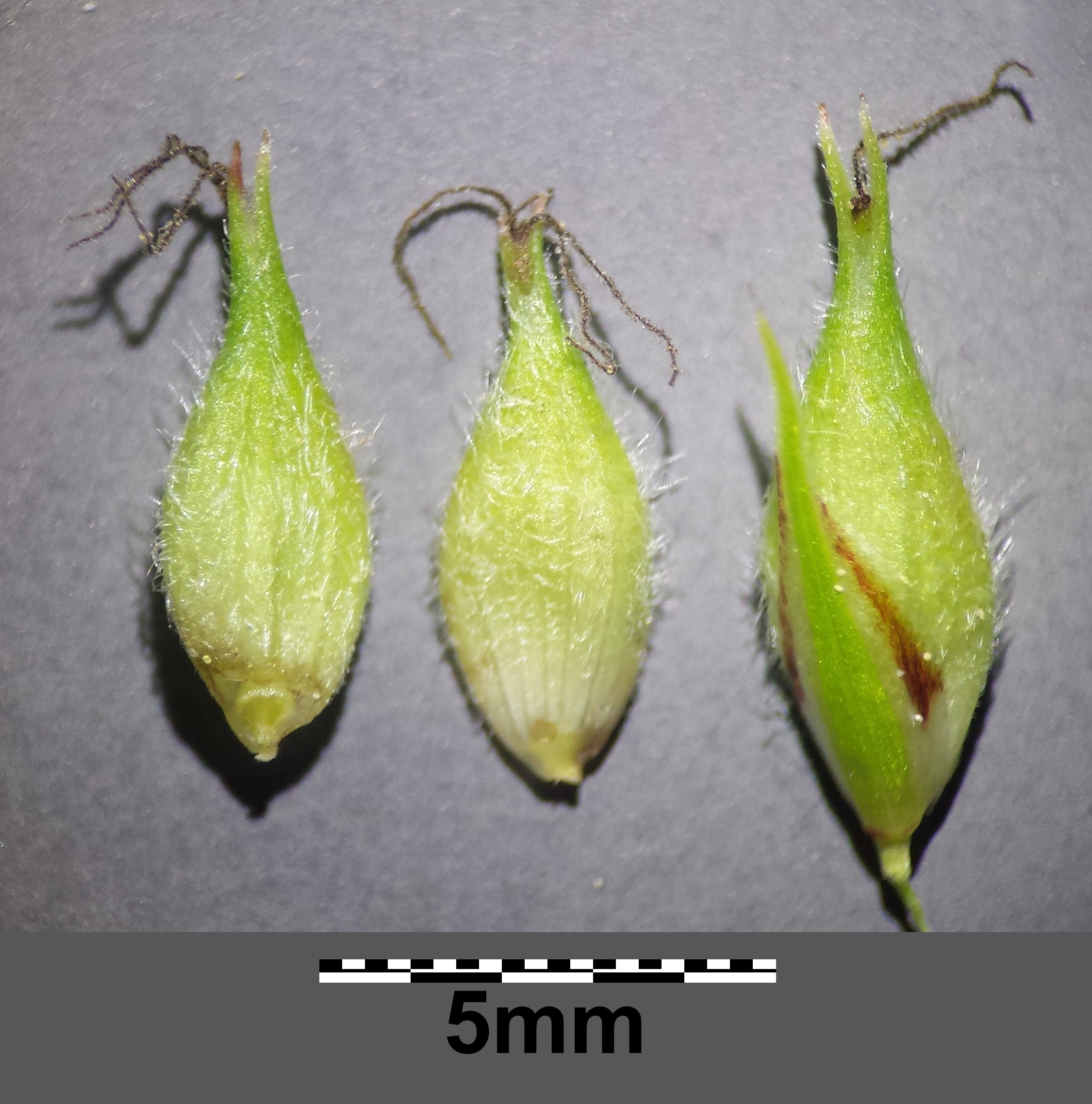
Carex hirta perigynia

== Perigynium vs. utricule ==
The terms perigynium and utricle have been widely used interchangeably. In North America, the term perigynium is preferred, while utricle is more commonly used in Europe. After the merging of Kobresia under Carex, a terminological clarification was desired, as the open prophyll of Kobresia could not be assimilated to the concept of utricle, which etymologically implies closure. The authors of a 2016 paper recommended using perigynium to refer generically to the flower prophyll of Carex sensu lato (including former Kobresia), but calling it utricle when it has its margins fused so it is entirely closed (as in the vast majority of Carex species).
