= Microphyes (disambiguation) =

Microphyes may refer to:

- Microphyes, a genus of plants in the family Caryophyllaceae
- Microphyes, a genus of beetles in the family Curculionidae, synonym of Nanomicrophyes
- Microphyes, a genus of beetles in the family Tenebrionidae, synonym of Alphitobius
