= Solitaria =

Solitaria may refer to:

- Solitaria, an order of Entoprocta in the phylum Kamptozoa
- Solitaria (lichen), a genus of fungi in the family Teloschistaceae
- Solitaria, a genus of plants in the family Caryophyllaceae, synonym of Shivparvatia
