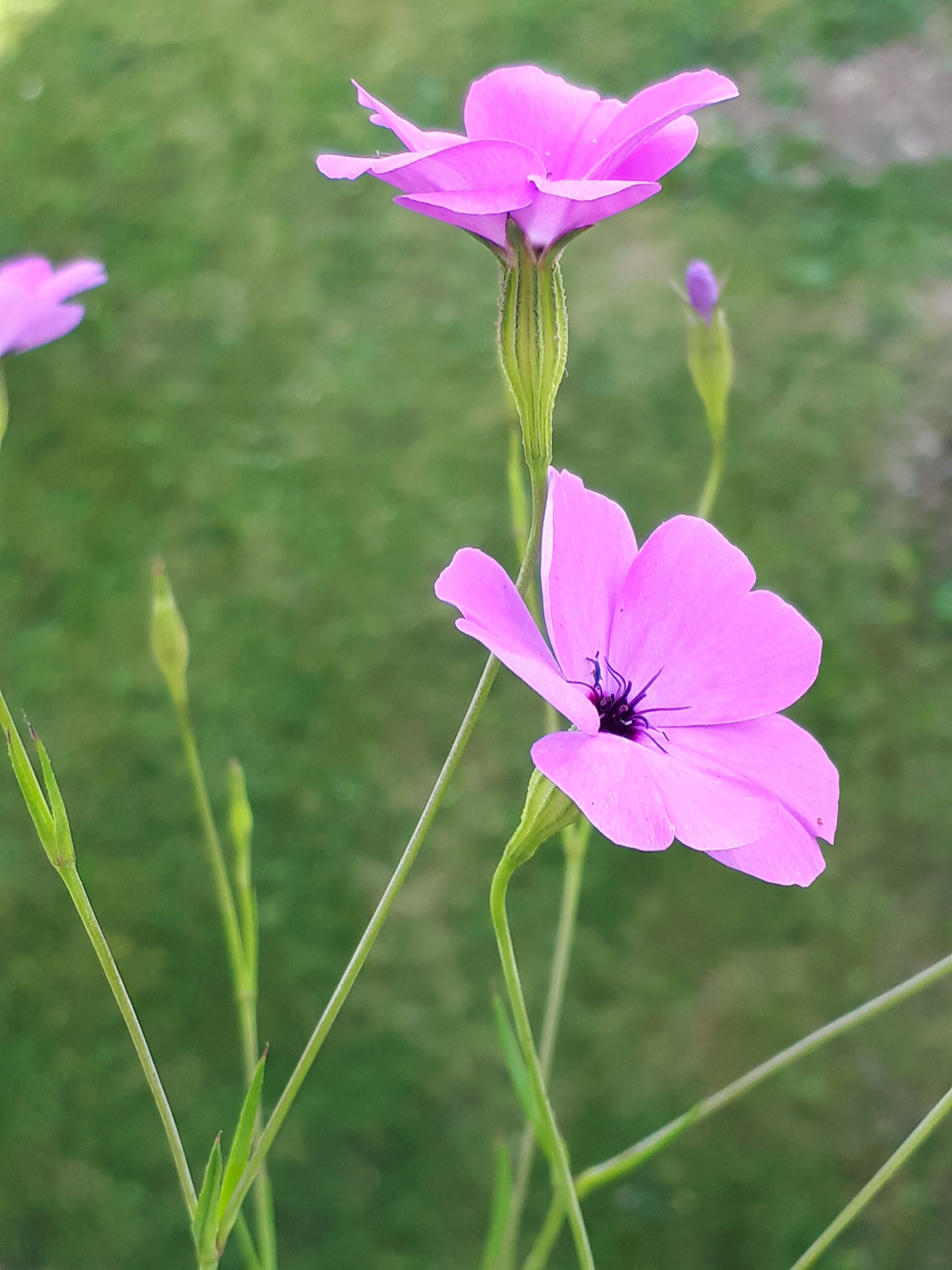
- In bloom
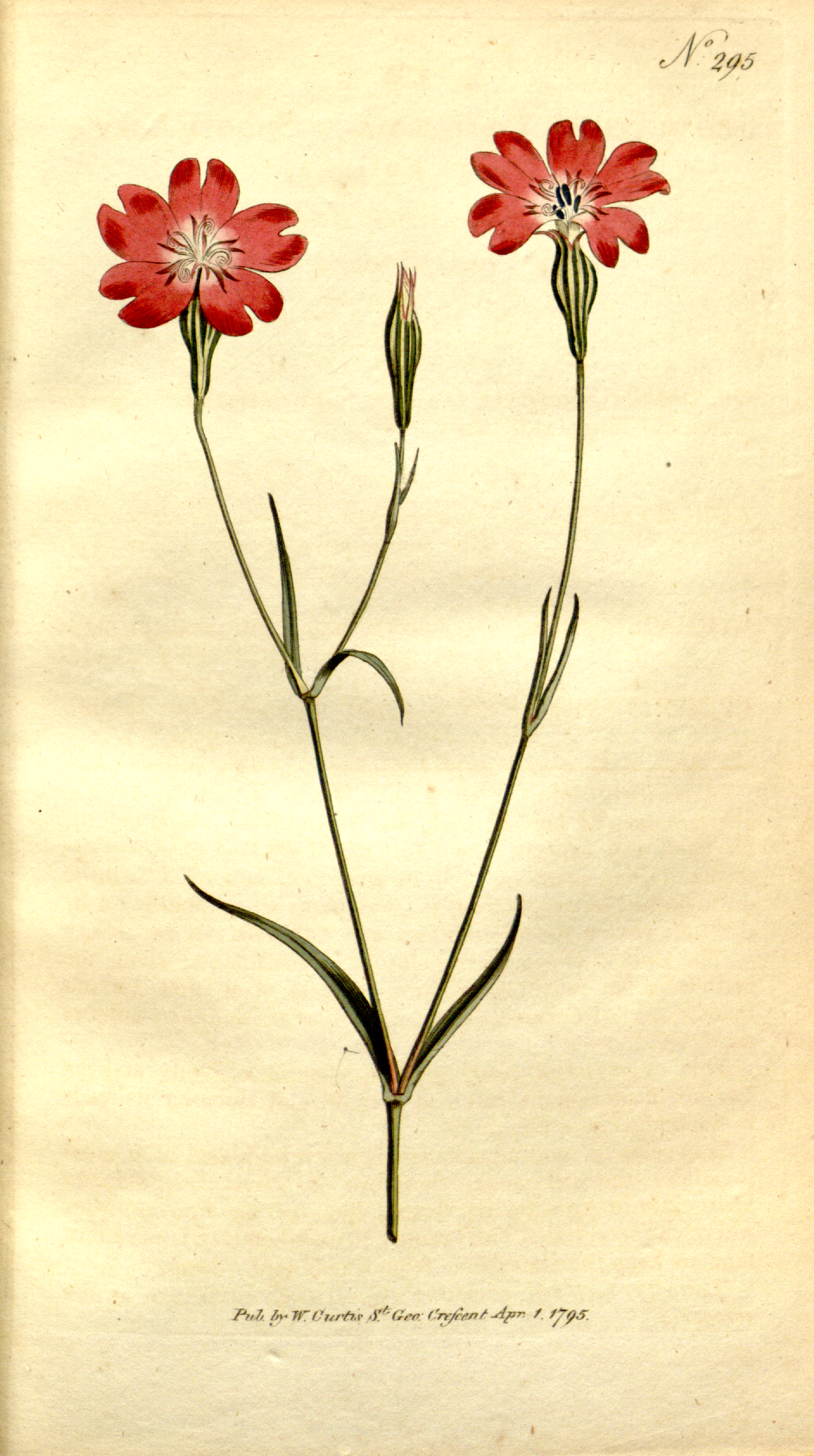
- Botanical illustration

Scientific classification
- Kingdom: Plantae
- Clade: Tracheophytes
- Clade: Angiosperms
- Clade: Eudicots
- Order: Caryophyllales
- Family: Caryophyllaceae
- Genus: Eudianthe
- Species: E. coeli-rosa

Binomial name
- Eudianthe coeli-rosa (L.) Fenzl ex Endl.

Synonyms
- Agrostemma coeli-rosea L.; Coronaria coeli-rosa (L.) Fr. ex Heynh.; Eudianthe oculata A.Braun; Lychnidia coeli-rosa (L.) Pomel; Lychnis coeli-rosa (L.) Desr.; Pontinia coeli-rosa (L.) Fr.; Silene coeli-rosa (L.) Godr.

= Eudianthe coeli-rosa =

Species of flowering plant in the carnation family

Eudianthe coeli-rosa, called the rose of heaven, is a flowering plant in the family Caryophyllaceae, native to the Canary Islands, Morocco, Algeria, Tunisia, Libya, Portugal, Spain, France (including Corsica), and Italy (including Sardinia and Sicily). An annual, it is grown in gardens as an ornamental.
