= Gymnocarpos bracteatus =

Conservation status
- Vulnerable (IUCN 3.1)

Scientific classification
- Kingdom: Plantae
- Clade: Tracheophytes
- Clade: Angiosperms
- Clade: Eudicots
- Order: Caryophyllales
- Family: Caryophyllaceae
- Genus: Gymnocarpos
- Species: G. bracteatus

Binomial name
- Gymnocarpos bracteatus (Balf.f.) Petruss. & Thulin

Synonyms
- Lochia bracteata Balf.f.

Species of plant

Gymnocarpos bracteatus is a species of plant in the family Caryophyllaceae. It is endemic to the Hajhir Mountains of Socotra in Yemen. Its natural habitat is subtropical or tropical dry shrubland.
