= Jordania ortegioides =

Scientific classification
- Kingdom: Plantae
- Clade: Tracheophytes
- Clade: Angiosperms
- Clade: Eudicots
- Order: Caryophyllales
- Family: Caryophyllaceae
- Genus: Jordania
- Species: J. ortegioides

Binomial name
- Jordania ortegioides (Fisch. & C.A.Mey.) Rabeler & Madhani (2024)

Synonyms
- Bolanthus ortegioides (Fisch. & C.A.Mey.) Madhani & Rabeler (2018); Gypsophila ortegioides (Fisch. & C.A.Mey.) Boiss. (1867); Phryna ortegioides (Fisch. & C.A.Mey.) Pax & K.Hoffm. (1934); Phrynella ortegioides (Fisch. & C.A.Mey.) Pax & K.Hoffm. (1934); Saponaria ortegioides (Fisch. & C.A.Mey.) Boiss. & Balansa (1859); Tunica ortegioides Fisch. & C.A.Mey. (1854); Tunica xylorrhiza Boiss. (1854)

Species of flowering plant

Jordania ortegioides is a species of flowering plant in the carnation family, Caryophyllaceae. It is a perennial native to southern and central Turkey and Syria.
