= Gymnocarpos kuriensis =

Conservation status
- Vulnerable (IUCN 3.1)

Scientific classification
- Kingdom: Plantae
- Clade: Tracheophytes
- Clade: Angiosperms
- Clade: Eudicots
- Order: Caryophyllales
- Family: Caryophyllaceae
- Genus: Gymnocarpos
- Species: G. kuriensis

Binomial name
- Gymnocarpos kuriensis (Radcl.-Sm.) Thulin (1996)

Synonyms
- Lochia bracteata subsp. abdulkuriana Chaudhri (1968); Lochia bracteata f. ciliata Chaudhri (1968); Lochia kuriensis Radcl.-Sm. (1971)

Species of flowering plant

Gymnocarpos kuriensis is a species of plant in the family Caryophyllaceae. It is endemic to the islands of Socotra and Abd al Kuri in Yemen. Its natural habitats are subtropical or tropical dry forests, subtropical or tropical dry shrubland, and rocky areas.
