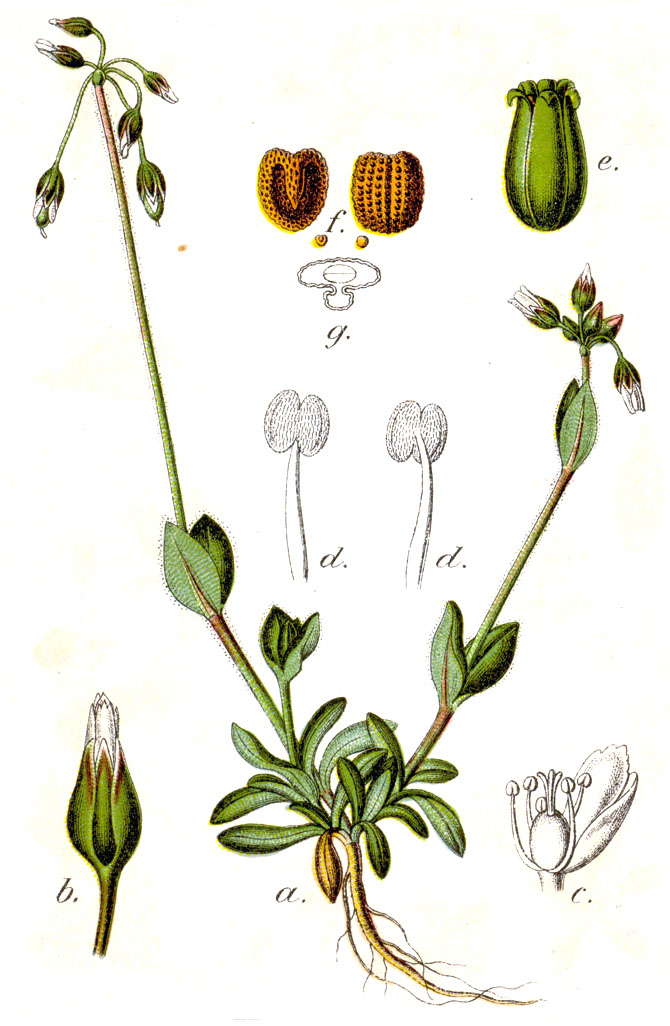

Scientific classification
- Kingdom: Plantae
- Clade: Tracheophytes
- Clade: Angiosperms
- Clade: Eudicots
- Order: Caryophyllales
- Family: Caryophyllaceae
- Genus: Holosteum
- Species: H. umbellatum

Binomial name
- Holosteum umbellatum L.

= Holosteum umbellatum =

Species of flowering plant

Holosteum umbellatum, the jagged chickweed, is a species of flowering plant in the family Caryophyllaceae. It is native to Europe but has also been introduced to North America.
