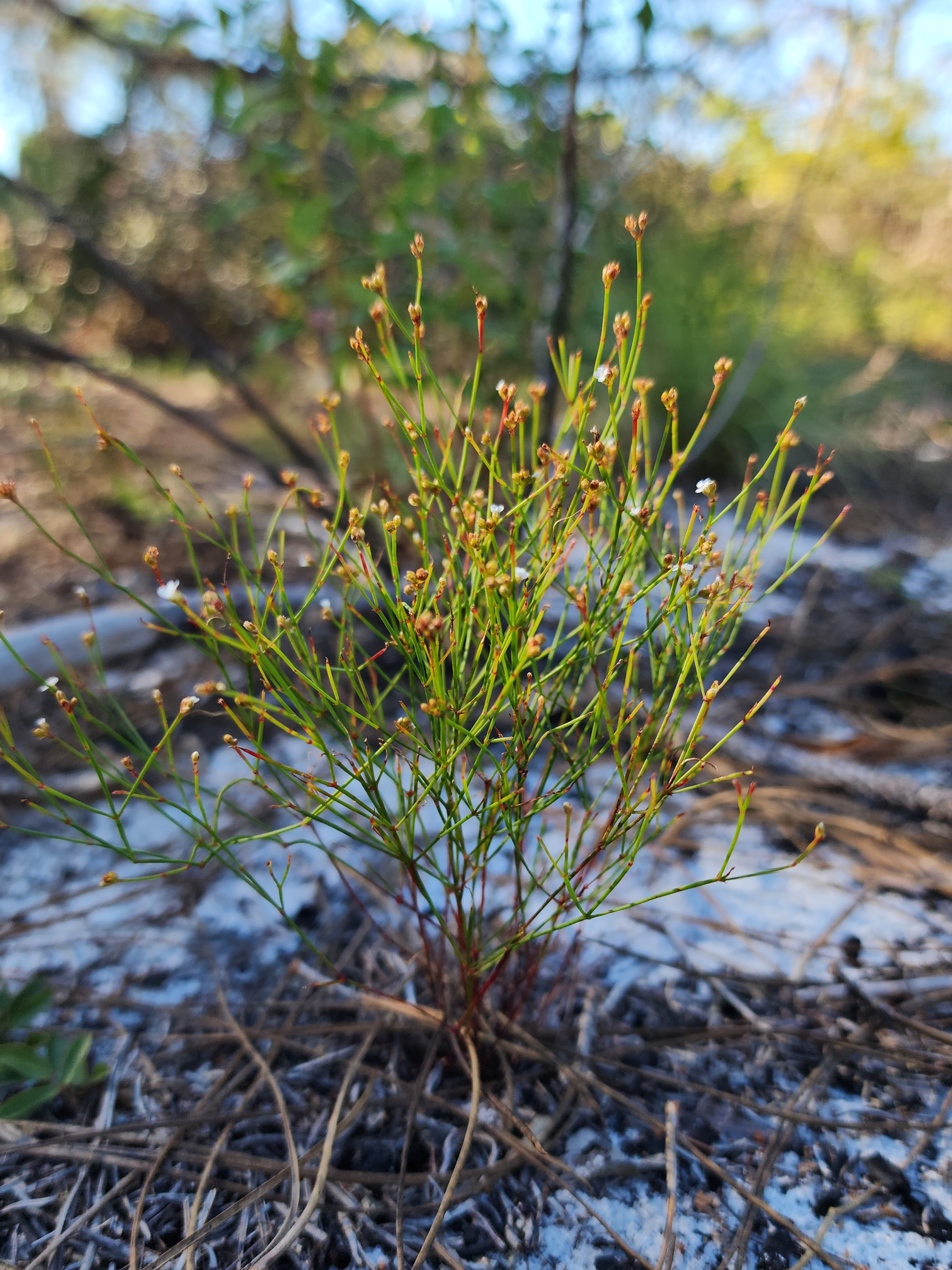
- Blooming in recently burned scrubby flatwood

Conservation status
- Apparently Secure (NatureServe)

Scientific classification
- Kingdom: Plantae
- Clade: Tracheophytes
- Clade: Angiosperms
- Clade: Eudicots
- Order: Caryophyllales
- Family: Caryophyllaceae
- Genus: Stipulicida
- Species: S. setacea

Binomial name
- Stipulicida setacea Michaux

= Stipulicida setacea =

Species of flowering plant

Stipulicida setacea, commonly referred to as wireplant, is a species of flowering plant endemic to the Southeastern United States.

== Habitat ==
It only occurs in the sandy, xeric habitats of the southeast coastal plain; including longleaf pine sandhill and dry flatwoods.
