= Streptomyces zhihengii =

Scientific classification
- Domain: Bacteria
- Kingdom: Bacillati
- Phylum: Actinomycetota
- Class: Actinomycetia
- Order: Streptomycetales
- Family: Streptomycetaceae
- Genus: Streptomyces
- Species: S. zhihengii

Binomial name
- Streptomyces zhihengii Huang et al. 2017

Type strain
- CGMCC 4.7248, DSM 42176, KCTC 39115, YIMT102

Species of bacterium

Streptomyces zhihengii is a bacterium species from the genus of Streptomyces which has been isolated from rhizospheric soil from the plant Psammosilene tunicoides from Lijiang in China.

== See also ==
- List of Streptomyces species
