= Kabulia =

Kabulia may refer to:

- Kabulia (grasshopper), a genus of grasshoppers in the family Acrididae
- Kabulia (plant), a genus of plants in the family Caryophyllaceae
