= Jordania (plant) =

Scientific classification
- Kingdom: Plantae
- Clade: Embryophytes
- Clade: Tracheophytes
- Clade: Spermatophytes
- Clade: Angiosperms
- Clade: Eudicots
- Order: Caryophyllales
- Family: Caryophyllaceae
- Genus: Jordania; Boiss.

Synonyms
- Phryna (Boiss.) Pax & K.Hoffm., non Phryne Bubani.; Phrynella (Pax & K.Hoffm.

Genus of flowering plants

Jordania is a genus of flowering plants in the family Caryophyllaceae. It includes 14 species native to Turkey, Syria, and Lebanon. The plant genus Jordania was named in honour of the prominent French botanist Claude Thomas Alexis Jordan.

== Species ==
14 species are accepted.

- Jordania aziz-sancarii (Koç & Hamzaoğlu) Rabeler & Madhani
- Jordania cherlerioides (Bornm.) Rabeler & Madhani
- Jordania confertifolia (Hub.-Mor.) Rabeler & Madhani
- Jordania frankenioides (Boiss.) Rabeler & Madhani
- Jordania hamzaoglui (Koç & Budak) Rabeler & Madhani
- Jordania huber-morathii (C.Simon) Rabeler & Madhani
- Jordania mevlanae (Aytaç) Rabeler & Madhani
- Jordania minuartioides (Jaub. & Spach) Boiss. & Heldr.
- Jordania ortegioides (Fisch. & C.A.Mey.) Rabeler & Madhani
- Jordania sandrasica (Hamzaoğlu & Koç) Rabeler & Madhani
- Jordania spergulifolia (Jaub. & Spach) Boiss.
- Jordania stenopetala (Hartvig & Å.Strid) Rabeler & Madhani
- Jordania thymoides (Hub.-Mor.) Rabeler & Madhani
- Jordania turcica (Koç & Hamzaoğlu) Rabeler & Madhani
