= Yazdana =

Scientific classification
- Kingdom: Plantae
- Clade: Tracheophytes
- Clade: Angiosperms
- Clade: Eudicots
- Order: Caryophyllales
- Family: Caryophyllaceae
- Genus: Yazdana; A.Pirani & Noroozi (2020)
- Species: Y. shirkuhensis

Binomial name
- Yazdana shirkuhensis A.Pirani & Noroozi (2020)

Genus of flowering plants

Yazdana shirkuhensis is a species of flowering plant in the carnation family, Caryophyllaceae. It is endemic to Iran. It is the sole species in genus Yazdana.
