= Triplateia =

Scientific classification
- Kingdom: Plantae
- Clade: Tracheophytes
- Clade: Angiosperms
- Clade: Eudicots
- Order: Caryophyllales
- Family: Caryophyllaceae
- Genus: Triplateia; Bartl. (1830)
- Species: T. moehringioides

Binomial name
- Triplateia moehringioides (Moc. & Sessé ex Ser.) Kuntze (1891)

Synonyms
- Alsine moehringioides (Moc. & Sessé ex Ser.) Rohrb. (1873); Bufonia tenuifolia Moc. & Sessé ex Ser. (1824), pro syn.; Hymenella moehringioides Moc. & Sessé ex Ser. (1824); Minuartia moehringioides (Moc. & Sessé ex Ser.) Mattf. (1921); Triplateia diffusa Bartl. (1831)

Genus of flowering plants

Triplateia moehringioides is a species of flowering plant in the carnation family, Caryophyllaceae. It is the sole species in genus Triplateia. It is an annual or subshrub native to northern, central, and southwestern Mexico, where it grows in deserts and dry shrublands.
