= Cerdia =

Scientific classification
- Kingdom: Plantae
- Clade: Tracheophytes
- Clade: Angiosperms
- Clade: Eudicots
- Order: Caryophyllales
- Family: Caryophyllaceae
- Genus: Cerdia; Moc. & Sessé ex DC.

Genus of flowering plants

Cerdia is a genus of flowering plants belonging to the family Caryophyllaceae.

Its native range is Mexico.

Species:

- Cerdia virescens Moc. & Sessé ex DC.
