= Gypsophiloides =

Scientific classification
- Kingdom: Plantae
- Clade: Tracheophytes
- Clade: Angiosperms
- Clade: Eudicots
- Order: Caryophyllales
- Family: Caryophyllaceae
- Genus: Gypsophiloides; Mahdavi & Assadi
- Species: G. alsinoides

Binomial name
- Gypsophiloides alsinoides (Bunge) Mahdavi & Assadi

Synonyms
- Arenaria bungei Barkoudah; Dichoglottis alsinoides (Bunge) Walp.; Gypsophila alsinoides Bunge (1847) (basionym); Silene alsinoides (Bunge) E.H.L.Krause; Stellaria blatteri Mattf.

Genus of flowering plants

Gypsophiloides is a genus of flowering plants in the family Caryophyllaceae. It includes a single species, Gypsophiloides alsinoides, an annual native to Iran, Afghanistan, Central Asia, and western Pakistan.

The species was first described as Gypsophila alsinoides by Alexander von Bunge in 1847. In 2023 Mahdavi & Assadi placed it in the new monotypic genus Gypsophiloides.
