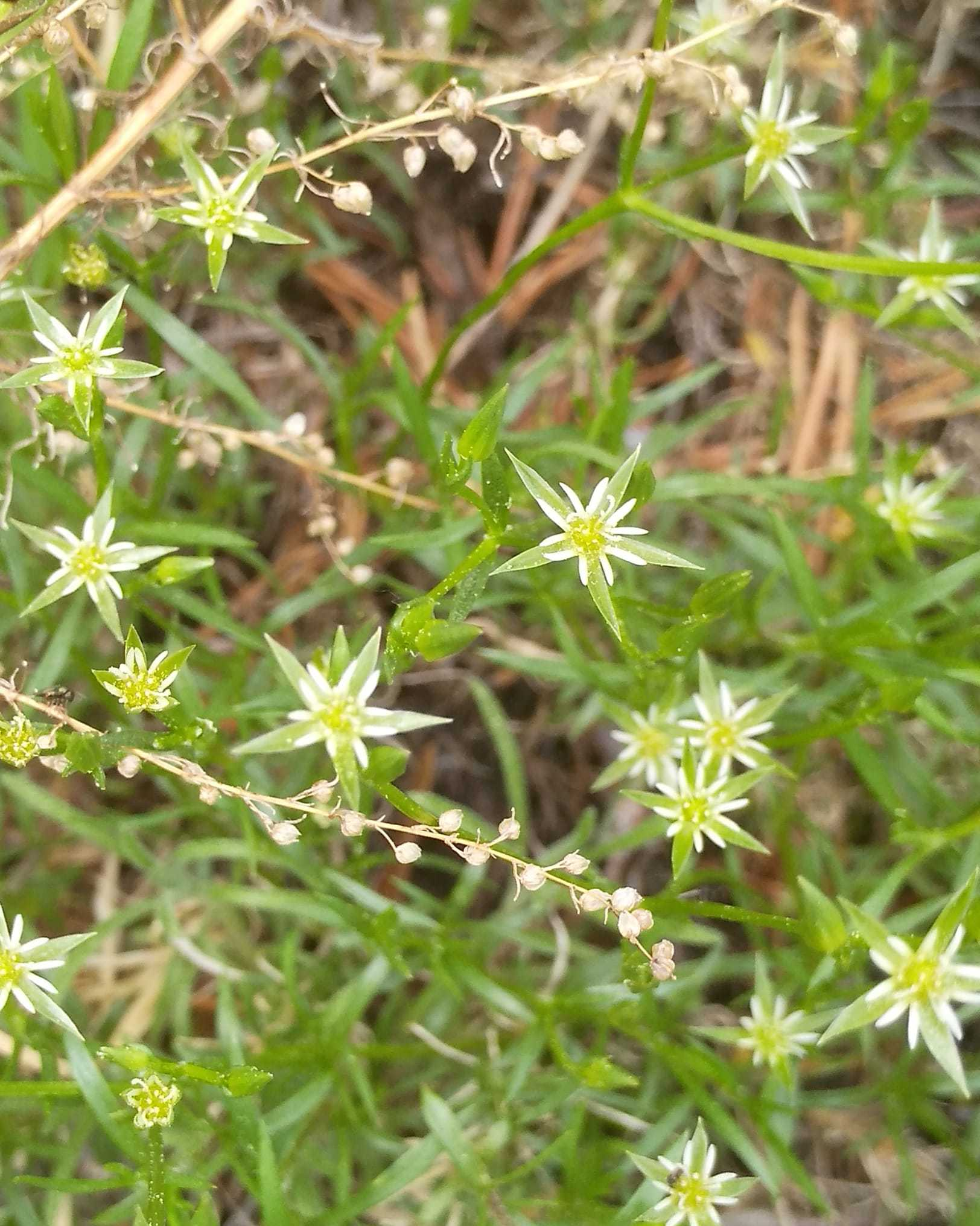
- Adenonema cherleriae

Scientific classification
- Kingdom: Plantae
- Clade: Tracheophytes
- Clade: Angiosperms
- Clade: Eudicots
- Order: Caryophyllales
- Family: Caryophyllaceae
- Genus: Adenonema; Bunge

= Adenonema =

Genus of plants

Adenonema is a genus of flowering plants belonging to the family Caryophyllaceae.

Its native range is Central Asia to Russian Far East and North China.

Species:

- Adenonema cherleriae (Fisch. ex Ser.) M.T.Sharples & E.A.Tripp
- Adenonema petraeum (Bunge) Bunge
