= Schizotechium =

Scientific classification
- Kingdom: Plantae
- Clade: Tracheophytes
- Clade: Angiosperms
- Clade: Eudicots
- Order: Caryophyllales
- Family: Caryophyllaceae
- Genus: Schizotechium (Fenzl) Rchb. (1841)

Species
- six; see text

Genus of flowering plants

Schizotechium is a genus of flowering plants in the carnation family, Caryophyllaceae. It includes six species which are native to central, south, and southeastern Asia.

== Species ==
Six species are accepted.

- Schizotechium delavayi (Franch.) Gang Yao, B.Xue & Z.Q.Song
- Schizotechium devendrae (Pusalkar & S.K.Srivast.) Pusalkar & S.K.Srivast.
- Schizotechium monospermum (Buch.-Ham. ex D.Don) Pusalkar & S.K.Srivast.
- Schizotechium motuoensis (Meng Li & Y.F.Song) W.Qiao Wang & Z.H.Ma
- Schizotechium paniculatum (Edgew.) Pusalkar & S.K.Srivast.
- Schizotechium turkestanicum (Schischk.) Arabi, Rabeler & Zarre
