= Nubelaria =

Scientific classification
- Kingdom: Plantae
- Clade: Tracheophytes
- Clade: Angiosperms
- Clade: Eudicots
- Order: Caryophyllales
- Family: Caryophyllaceae
- Genus: Nubelaria; M.T.Sharples & E.A.Tripp (2019)

Species
- Nubelaria arisanensis (Hayata) M.T.Sharples & E.A.Tripp; Nubelaria diversiflora (Maxim.) M.T.Sharples & E.A.Tripp; Nubelaria wushanensis (F.N.Williams) M.T.Sharples & E.A.Tripp

Genus of flowering plants

Nubelaria is a genus of flowering plants in the carnation family, Caryophyllaceae. It includes three species native to north-central and southern China, Taiwan, and Japan.

- Nubelaria arisanensis (Hayata) M.T.Sharples & E.A.Tripp – Taiwan
- Nubelaria diversiflora (Maxim.) M.T.Sharples & E.A.Tripp – Japan
- Nubelaria wushanensis (F.N.Williams) M.T.Sharples & E.A.Tripp – north-central and southern China

The genus was described in 2019 by Mathew T. Sharples and Erin Anne Tripp. The species in the genus were previously placed in genus Stellaria.
