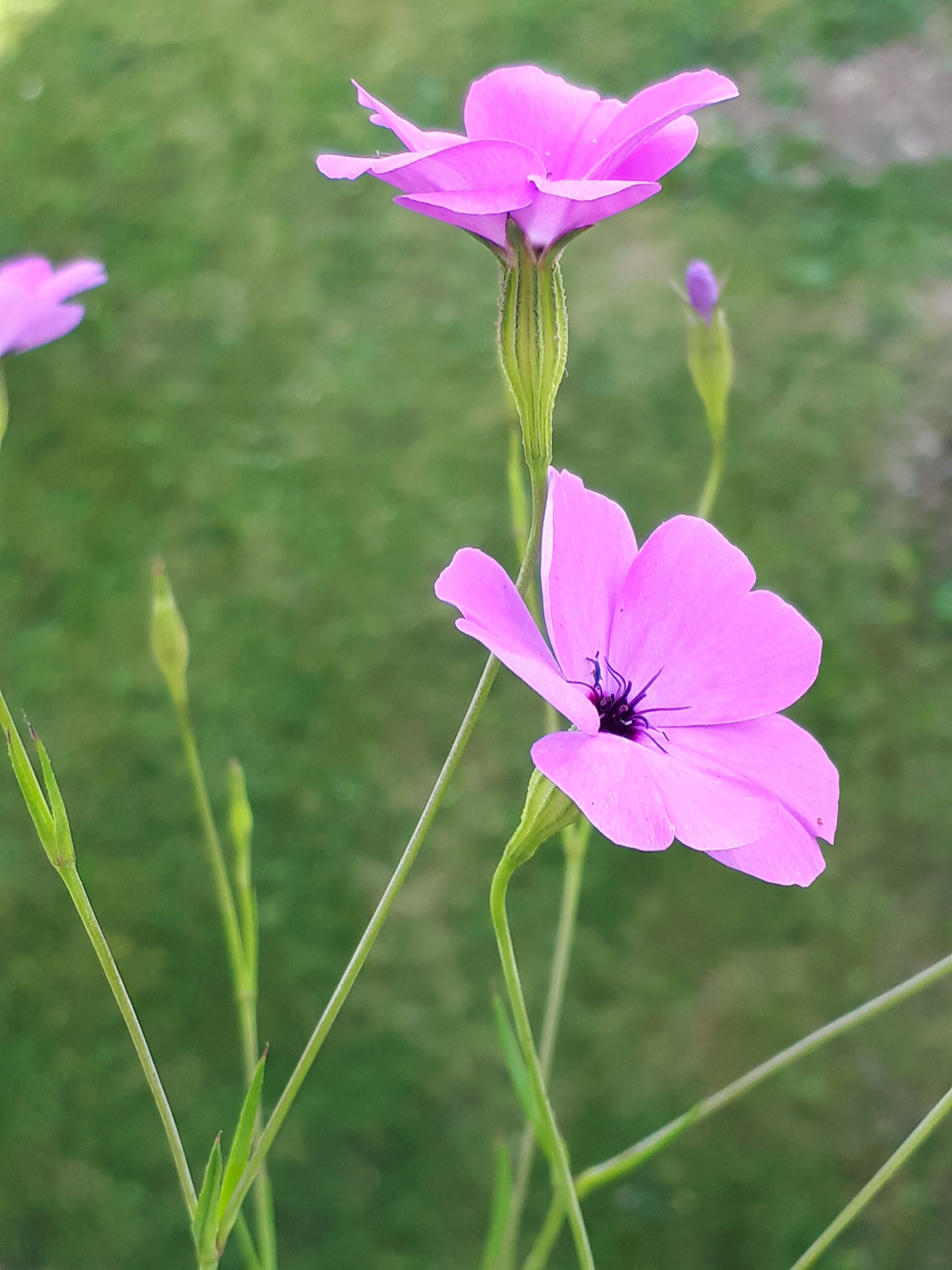
- Eudianthe coeli-rosa

Scientific classification
- Kingdom: Plantae
- Clade: Tracheophytes
- Clade: Angiosperms
- Clade: Eudicots
- Order: Caryophyllales
- Family: Caryophyllaceae
- Tribe: Sileneae
- Genus: Eudianthe (Rchb.) Rchb.

Species
- See text

Synonyms
- Pontinia Fr.

= Eudianthe =

Genus of plants in the carnation family

Eudianthe is a small genus of flowering plants in the family Caryophyllaceae, found in the Canary Islands and the western Mediterranean. It can be distinguished from other members of the tribe Sileneae by its linear to narrowly lanceolate leaves and its pink flowers.

== Species ==
Currently accepted species include:

- Eudianthe coeli-rosa (L.) Fenzl ex Endl.
- Eudianthe laeta (Aiton) Rchb. ex Willk.
- Eudianthe lagrangei (Coss.) Pau
