= Maguirellaria =

Scientific classification
- Kingdom: Plantae
- Clade: Tracheophytes
- Clade: Angiosperms
- Clade: Eudicots
- Order: Caryophyllales
- Family: Caryophyllaceae
- Genus: Maguirellaria; Iamonico

Species
- Maguirellaria howardii (Maguire) Iamonico; Maguirellaria minutifolia (Maguire) Iamonico

Genus of flowering plants

Maguirellaria is a genus of flowering plants in the family Caryophyllaceae. It includes two species of subshrubs endemic to the Dominican Republic.

- Maguirellaria howardii (Maguire) Iamonico
- Maguirellaria minutifolia (Maguire) Iamonico
