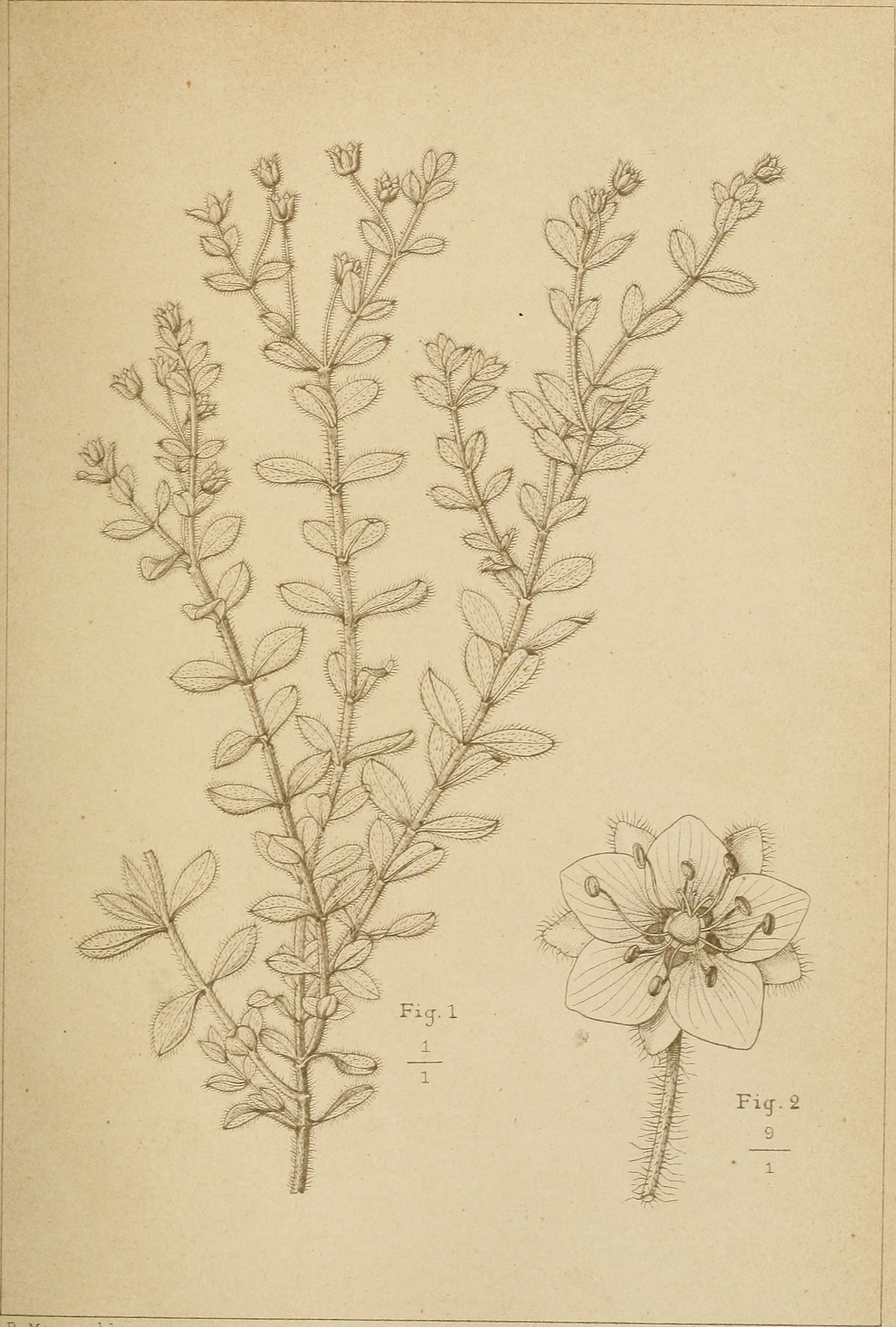

Scientific classification
- Kingdom: Plantae
- Clade: Tracheophytes
- Clade: Angiosperms
- Clade: Eudicots
- Order: Caryophyllales
- Family: Caryophyllaceae
- Genus: Rhodalsine; J.Gay (1845)
- Species: R. geniculata

Binomial name
- Rhodalsine geniculata (Poir.) F.N.Williams (1898)

Synonyms
- Synonymy: Psammanthe Rchb. (1841), nom. rej.; Alsine bartolottii A.Huet ex Nyman (1878); Alsine extensa Nyman (1878); Alsine gayana Christ (1887); Alsine geniculata (Poir.) Strobl (1885); Alsine geniculata var. bartollotae (Tineo) Fiori (1923), nom. superfl.; Alsine geniculata var. extensa (Dufour) Fiori (1923); Alsine geniculata var. herniariifolia (Desf.) Fiori (1898); Alsine geniculata var. procumbens (Vahl) Fiori (1923); Alsine maroccana Batt. (1921); Alsine platyphylla Christ (1887); Alsine procumbens (Vahl) Fenzl (1833), nom. illeg.; Alsine procumbens f. angustifolia Strobl (1885); Alsine procumbens var. extensa (Dufour) Gürke (1899); Alsine procumbens var. herniariifolia (Desf.) Strobl (1885); Alsine rosea C.Presl ex Nyman (1878); Arenaria bartollotae Tineo (1817); Arenaria extensa Dufour (1820); Arenaria gayana (Christ) F.N.Williams (1898); Arenaria geniculata Poir. (1789) (basionym); Arenaria herniariifolia Desf. (1798); Arenaria procumbens Vahl (1790); Arenaria procumbens var. linearifolia Moris (1837); Arenaria rosea C.Presl (1826); Arenaria rosea var. spathulata C.Presl (1826); Arenaria vestita Baker (1895); Arenaria viscosa Pourr. ex Webb & Berth. (1840), not validly publ.; Cherleria geniculata (Poir.) Samp. (1913); Cherleria geniculata proles herniariifolia (Desf.) Samp. (1913); Lepigonum roseum Raf. (1837); Minuartia gayana (Christ) Maire (1936); Minuartia geniculata (Poir.) Thell. (1912); Minuartia geniculata f. filifolia Caball. (1935); Minuartia geniculata var. fontqueri Maire in Cavanillesia 2: 48 (1929); Minuartia geniculata var. herniariifolia (Desf.) Graebn. (1918); Minuartia geniculata var. linearifolia (Moris) Maire (1938); Minuartia geniculata var. maroccana (Batt.) Maire (1928); Minuartia geniculata var. poiretiana (F.N.Williams) Maire (1932); Minuartia geniculata var. procumbens (Vahl) Maire (1932); Minuartia geniculata f. villosissima Faure & Maire (1938); Minuartia maroccana Pau & Font Quer (1928); Minuartia platyphylla (J.Gay ex Christ) Sunding (1970), nom. illeg.; Minuartia platyphylla (Christ) McNeill (1962); Minuartia procumbens (Vahl) Asch. (1918); Minuartia procumbens var. extensa (Dufour) Graebn. (1918); Minuartia procumbens var. glabrescens Pamp. (1936); Minuartia procumbens f. glaucovirens H.Lindb. (1932); Minuartia procumbens var. obovata H.Lindb. (1932); Minuartia senneniana Maire & Mauricio (1936); Minuartia vestita (Baker) McNeill (1962); Minuartia webbii McNeill & Bramwell (1974); Minuartia wilczekii Maire & Sennen (1934), nom. provis.; Moehringia alleizettei Batt. (1917); Rhodalsine gayana (Christ) Holub (1984); Rhodalsine geniculata var. communis F.N.Williams (1898), nom. superfl.; Rhodalsine geniculata var. fontqueri (Maire) Dobignard (1997); Rhodalsine geniculata var. gayana F.N.Williams (1898); Rhodalsine geniculata var. glabrata F.N.Williams (1898); Rhodalsine geniculata var. maroccana (Batt.) Dobignard (1997); Rhodalsine geniculata var. poiretiana F.N.Williams (1898); Rhodalsine geniculata var. procumbens (Vahl) Dubuis (1986-1987 publ. 1988); Rhodalsine platyphylla J.Gay ex Christ (1887); Rhodalsine procumbens (Vahl) J.Gay (1845); Rhodalsine procumbens var. linearifolia (Moris) F.N.Williams (1898); Rhodalsine senneniana (Maire & Mauricio) Greuter & Burdet (1982)

= Rhodalsine =

Genus of flowering plants

Rhodalsine geniculata is a species of flowering plant belonging to the family Caryophyllaceae. It is the sole species in genus Rhodalsine.

Its native range is the Canary Islands, the Mediterranean Basin (northern Africa, Iberia, Italy, Greece, and Cyprus) and northern Somalia.
