= Reniostellaria =

Scientific classification
- Kingdom: Plantae
- Clade: Tracheophytes
- Clade: Angiosperms
- Clade: Eudicots
- Order: Caryophyllales
- Family: Caryophyllaceae
- Genus: Reniostellaria; Gang Yao, B.Xue & Z.Q.Song
- Species: R. bistylata

Binomial name
- Reniostellaria bistylata (W.Z.Di & Y.Ren) Gang Yao, B.Xue & Z.Q.Song

Synonyms
- Stellaria bistylata W.Z.Di & Y.Ren; Stellaria bistyla Y.Z.Zhao

Genus of flowering plants

Reniostellaria is a genus of flowering plants in the family Caryophyllaceae. It includes a single species, Reniostellaria bistylata, a perennial or subshrub endemic to the Helan Mountains of Inner Mongolia in north-central China.

The species was first described as Stellaria bistylata by Wei Zhong Di and Yi Ren in 1985. In 2023 Gang Yao, Bine Xue, and Zhu Qiu Song placed it in the newly described monotypic genus Reniostellaria as Reniostellaria bistylata.
