= Xerotia =

Scientific classification
- Kingdom: Plantae
- Clade: Tracheophytes
- Clade: Angiosperms
- Clade: Eudicots
- Order: Caryophyllales
- Family: Caryophyllaceae
- Genus: Xerotia; Oliv. (1895)
- Species: X. arabica

Binomial name
- Xerotia arabica Oliv. (1895)

Genus of flowering plants

Xerotia arabica is a species of flowering plant belonging to the family Caryophyllaceae. It is the sole species in genus Xerotia. It is a subshrub or shrub native to Yemen and Oman in the southern Arabian Peninsula, where it grows in deserts and dry shrublands.
