= Pseudocherleria =

Scientific classification
- Kingdom: Plantae
- Clade: Tracheophytes
- Clade: Angiosperms
- Clade: Eudicots
- Order: Caryophyllales
- Family: Caryophyllaceae
- Genus: Pseudocherleria; Dillenb. & Kadereit

Genus of plants

Pseudocherleria is a genus of flowering plants belonging to the family Caryophyllaceae.

Its native range is subarctic western North America and Eurasia to northern China, Korea, and Japan, as well as Turkey, the Caucasus, and Iran.

== Species ==
10 species are accepted.

- Pseudocherleria aizoides (Boiss.) Dillenb. & Kadereit
- Pseudocherleria brotheriana (Trautv.) Dillenb. & Kadereit
- Pseudocherleria charadzeae (Lazkov) Dillenb. & Kadereit
- Pseudocherleria colchica (Kharadze) Dillenb. & Kadereit
- Pseudocherleria imbricata (C.A.Mey.) Dillenb. & Kadereit
- Pseudocherleria inamoena (C.A.Mey.) Dillenb. & Kadereit
- Pseudocherleria laricina (L.) Dillenb. & Kadereit
- Pseudocherleria macrocarpa (Pursh) Dillenb. & Kadereit
- Pseudocherleria pseudoimbricata (Lazkov) Dillenb. & Kadereit
- Pseudocherleria rhodocalyx (Albov) Dillenb. & Kadereit
