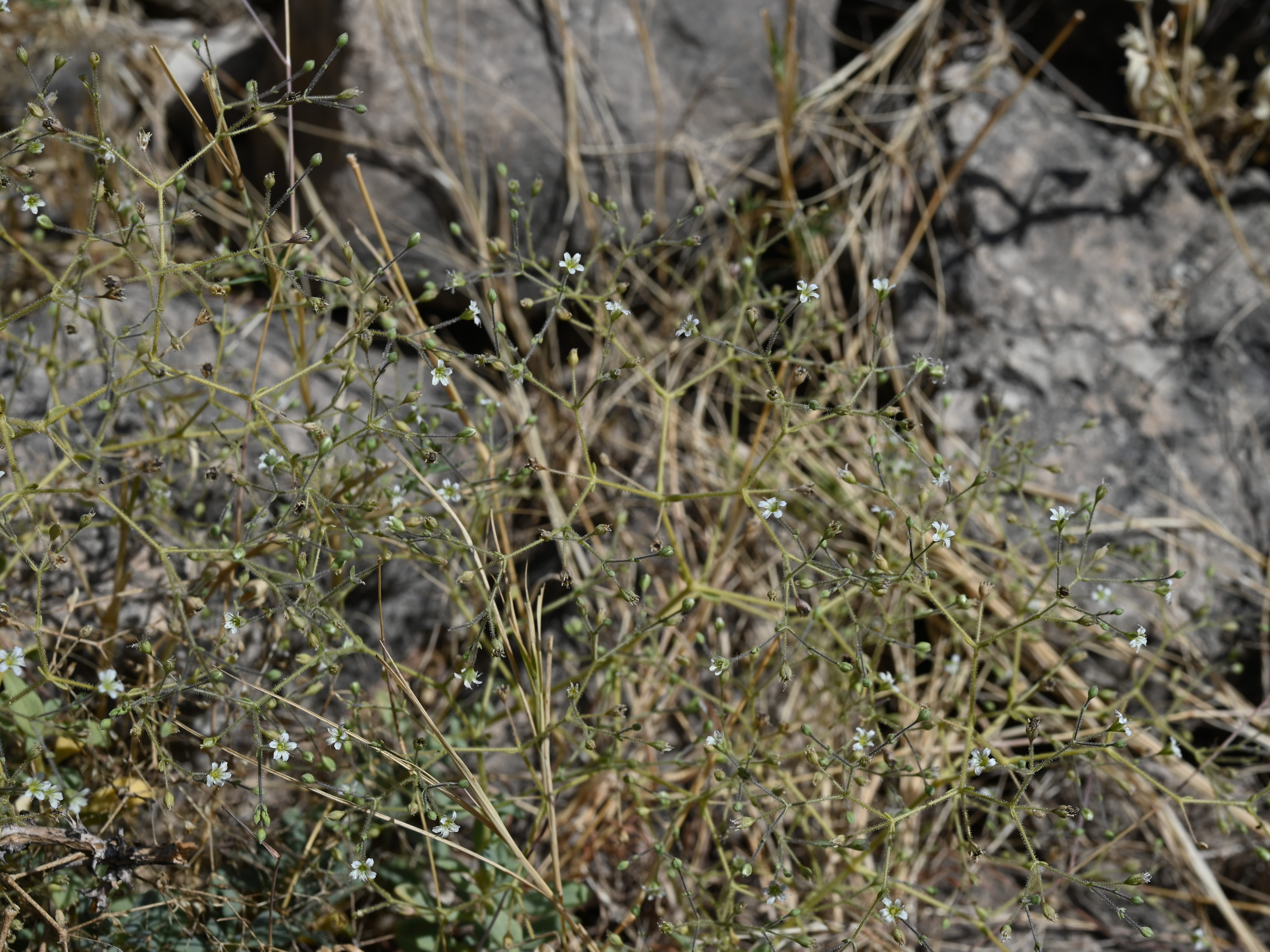
- Petroana montana in Dhofar, Oman

Scientific classification
- Kingdom: Plantae
- Clade: Embryophytes
- Clade: Tracheophytes
- Clade: Spermatophytes
- Clade: Angiosperms
- Clade: Eudicots
- Order: Caryophyllales
- Family: Caryophyllaceae
- Genus: Petroana; Madhani & Zarre

Type species
- Petroana montserratii (Fern. Casas.) Madhani & Zarre

= Petroana =

Genus of plants

Petroana is a genus of flowering plants belonging to the family Caryophyllaceae, established by Madhani & Zarre in 2018 based on molecular and morphological evidence that distinguished its species from those in the closely related genera Gypsophila and Dianthus. This genus includes perennial herbs characterized by their adaptation to rocky habitats, with two species currently recognized: the type species Petroana montserratii (Fern.Casas) Madhani & Zarre and Petroana montana (Balf.f.) Madhani & Zarre.

== Etymology ==
The genus name Petroana derives from the Greek "petro-", meaning rock, and the suffix "-ana", pertaining to, reflecting the rocky environments these plants inhabit.

== Distribution and habitat ==
Petroana species exhibit a disjunct distribution, with P. montserratii found in the Iberian Peninsula and P. montana in Yemen, Socotra, Oman, and Somalia. These plants typically grow in rocky slopes, gravelly wadi beds, limestone cracks, and vertical walls, demonstrating a preference for calcareous substrates.

== Taxonomy ==
Species:

- Petroana montana (Balf.f.) Madhani & Zarre – found in the Arabian Peninsula and Horn of Africa
- Petroana montserratii (Fern.Casas) Madhani & Zarre – the type species, native to the Iberian Peninsula
