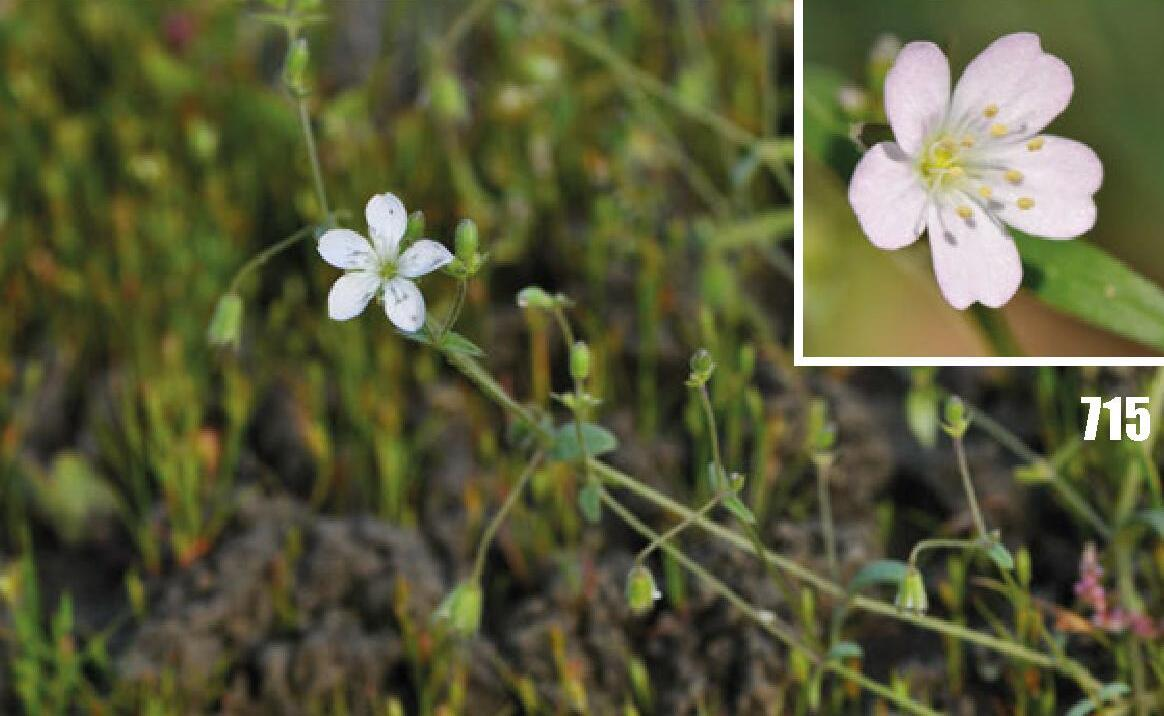
- Lepyrodiclis holosteoides

Scientific classification
- Kingdom: Plantae
- Clade: Tracheophytes
- Clade: Angiosperms
- Clade: Eudicots
- Order: Caryophyllales
- Family: Caryophyllaceae
- Genus: Lepyrodiclis; Fenzl

= Lepyrodiclis =

Genus of plants

Lepyrodiclis is a genus of flowering plants belonging to the family Caryophyllaceae.

Its native range is Caucasus to Mongolia and Himalaya.

Species:

- Lepyrodiclis holosteoides (C.A.Mey.) Fenzl ex Fisch. & C.A.Mey.
- Lepyrodiclis stellarioides Schrenk
- Lepyrodiclis tenera Boiss.
