= Odontostemma =

Scientific classification
- Kingdom: Plantae
- Clade: Tracheophytes
- Clade: Angiosperms
- Clade: Eudicots
- Order: Caryophyllales
- Family: Caryophyllaceae
- Genus: Odontostemma; Benth. ex G.Don (1831)

Species
- 61; see text

Synonyms
- Gooringia F.N.Williams (1897)

Genus of flowering plants

Odontostemma is a genus of flowering plants in the carnation family, Caryophyllaceae. It includes 61 species native to the Himalayas and Tibetan Plateau, including parts of India, Pakistan, Nepal, Bhutan, Myanmar, and China.

== Species ==
61 species are accepted.

- Odontostemma amdoense (L.H.Zhou) Rabeler & W.L.Wagner
- Odontostemma auricomum (Tsui ex L.H.Zhou) Rabeler & W.L.Wagner
- Odontostemma balfourianum (W.W.Sm.) Satish Chandra & D.S.Rawat
- Odontostemma barbatum (Franch.) Sadeghian & Zarre
- Odontostemma bomiense (L.H.Zhou) Rabeler & W.L.Wagner
- Odontostemma chamdoense (C.Y.Wu ex L.H.Zhou) Rabeler & W.L.Wagner
- Odontostemma dawuense (A.J.Li & Q.Ban) Gang Yao
- Odontostemma delavayi (Franch.) Rabeler & W.L.Wagner
- Odontostemma dimorphitrichum (C.Y.Wu ex L.H.Zhou) Rabeler & W.L.Wagner
- Odontostemma dsharaense (Pax & K.Hoffm.) Rabeler & W.L.Wagner
- Odontostemma euodontum (W.W.Sm.) Rabeler & W.L.Wagner
- Odontostemma filipes (C.Y.Wu ex L.H.Zhou) Rabeler & W.L.Wagner
- Odontostemma fimbriatum (Mattf.) Rabeler & W.L.Wagner
- Odontostemma fridericae (Hand.-Mazz.) Sadeghian & Zarre
- Odontostemma giraldii (Diels) Rabeler & W.L.Wagner
- Odontostemma glandulosum Benth. ex G.Don
- Odontostemma inconspicuum (Hand.-Mazz.) Rabeler & W.L.Wagner
- Odontostemma inornatum (W.W.Sm.) Rabeler & W.L.Wagner
- Odontostemma ionandrum (Diels) Sadeghian & Zarre
- Odontostemma karakorense (Em.Schmid) Rabeler & W.L.Wagner
- Odontostemma leucasterium (Mattf.) Rabeler & W.L.Wagner
- Odontostemma littledalei (Hemsl.) Rabeler & W.L.Wagner
- Odontostemma longicaule (C.Y.Wu ex L.H.Zhou) Rabeler & W.L.Wagner
- Odontostemma longipes (C.Y.Wu ex L.H.Zhou) Rabeler & W.L.Wagner
- Odontostemma longipetiolatum (C.Y.Wu ex L.H.Zhou) Rabeler & W.L.Wagner
- Odontostemma longisetum (C.Y.Wu) Rabeler & W.L.Wagner
- Odontostemma longistylum (Franch.) Rabeler & W.L.Wagner
- Odontostemma mairei (H.Lév.) Rabeler & W.L.Wagner
- Odontostemma melanandrum (Maxim.) Rabeler & W.L.Wagner
- Odontostemma membranisepalum (C.Y.Wu) Rabeler & W.L.Wagner
- Odontostemma minimum (C.Y.Wu ex L.H.Zhou) Rabeler & W.L.Wagner
- Odontostemma moniliferum (Mattf.) Rabeler & W.L.Wagner
- Odontostemma napuligerum (Franch.) Rabeler & W.L.Wagner
- Odontostemma nigricans (Hand.-Mazz.) Rabeler & W.L.Wagner
- Odontostemma nivalomontanum (C.Y.Wu ex L.H.Zhou) Rabeler & W.L.Wagner
- Odontostemma omeiense (C.Y.Wu ex L.H.Zhou) Rabeler & W.L.Wagner
- Odontostemma paramelanandrum (H.Hara) Rabeler & W.L.Wagner
- Odontostemma pharense (McNeill & Majumdar) Rabeler & W.L.Wagner
- Odontostemma pogonanthum (W.W.Sm.) Sadeghian & Zarre
- Odontostemma polyspermum (C.Y.Wu ex L.H.Zhou) Rabeler & W.L.Wagner
- Odontostemma pseudostellaria (C.Y.Wu, L.H.Zhou & W.L.Wagner) Rabeler & W.L.Wagner
- Odontostemma quadridentatum (Maxim.) Rabeler & W.L.Wagner
- Odontostemma reductum (Hand.-Mazz.) Rabeler & W.L.Wagner
- Odontostemma rockii (Diels) Rabeler & W.L.Wagner
- Odontostemma roseiflorum (Sprague) Sadeghian & Zarre
- Odontostemma saginoides (Maxim.) Rabeler & W.L.Wagner
- Odontostemma salweenense (W.W.Sm.) Rabeler & W.L.Wagner
- Odontostemma schneiderianum (Hand.-Mazz.) Rabeler & W.L.Wagner
- Odontostemma setiferum (C.Y.Wu ex L.H.Zhou) Rabeler & W.L.Wagner
- Odontostemma shennongjiaense (Z.E.Chao & Z.H.Shen) Gang Yao
- Odontostemma spathulifolium (C.Y.Wu ex L.H.Zhou) Rabeler & W.L.Wagner
- Odontostemma szechuense (F.N.Williams) Rabeler & W.L.Wagner
- Odontostemma thangoense (W.W.Sm.) Rabeler & W.L.Wagner
- Odontostemma trichophorum (Franch.) Sadeghian & Zarre
- Odontostemma trichophyllum (C.Y.Wu ex L.H.Zhou) Rabeler & W.L.Wagner
- Odontostemma tumengelaense (L.H.Zhou) Rabeler & W.L.Wagner
- Odontostemma weissianum (Hand.-Mazz.) Rabeler & W.L.Wagner
- Odontostemma xerophilum (W.W.Sm.) Rabeler & W.L.Wagner
- Odontostemma yulongshanense (L.H.Zhou) Rabeler & W.L.Wagner
- Odontostemma yunnanense (Franch.) Rabeler & W.L.Wagner
- Odontostemma zhongdianense (C.Y.Wu) Rabeler & W.L.Wagner
