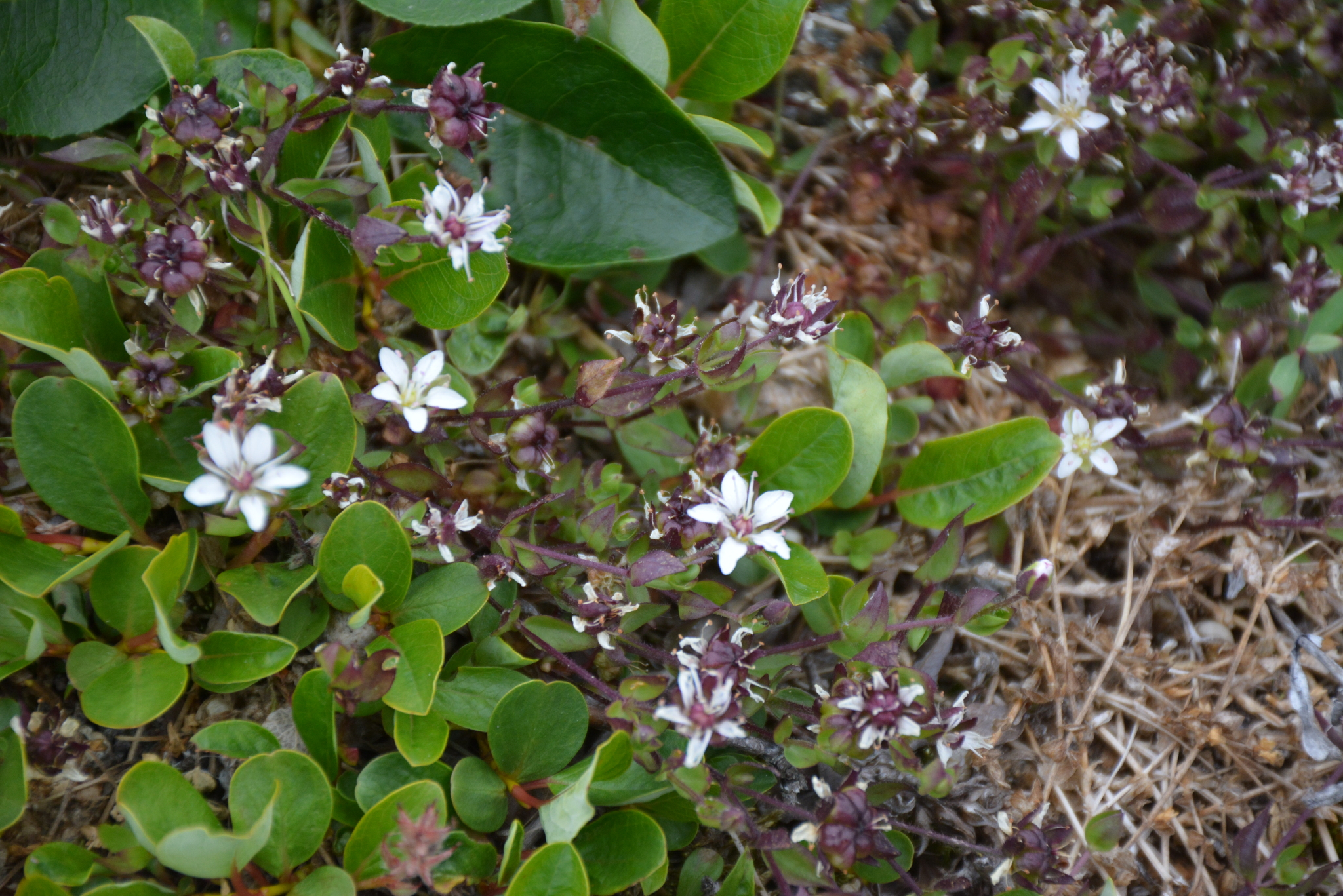
- Wilhelmsia physodes

Scientific classification
- Kingdom: Plantae
- Clade: Tracheophytes
- Clade: Angiosperms
- Clade: Eudicots
- Order: Caryophyllales
- Family: Caryophyllaceae
- Genus: Wilhelmsia; Rchb.
- Species: W. physodes

Binomial name
- Wilhelmsia physodes (Fisch. ex Ser.) McNeill

Synonyms
- Arenaria physodes Fisch. ex Ser.; Merckia physodes (Fisch. ex Ser.) Fisch. ex Cham. & Schltdl.

= Wilhelmsia =

Genus of flowering plants

Wilhelmsia is a monotypic genus of plants in the family Caryophyllaceae. It contains only one species, Wilhelmsia physodes, native to Alaska, northern Canada (Yukon and Northwest Territories), and Russia.

Wilhelmsia physodes is distinctive in the family because of its large, inflated ovary that develops into a round, purple capsule up to 10 mm in diameter, partially septate (divided inside) into 3 compartments, each with 2 teeth on the outside. The plant is a perennial herb spreading by means of underground rhizomes. Stems are generally prostrated except for the upright flowering stalk. Leaves are up to 15 mm. Sepals are green, tinged with purple. Petals are white.
