= Bolanthus =

Scientific classification
- Kingdom: Plantae
- Clade: Tracheophytes
- Clade: Angiosperms
- Clade: Eudicots
- Order: Caryophyllales
- Family: Caryophyllaceae
- Genus: Bolanthus (Ser.) Rchb. (1841)

Synonyms
- Graecobolanthus Madhani & Rabeler (2018)

Genus of flowering plants

Bolanthus is a genus of flowering plants belonging to the family Caryophyllaceae. It includes 21 species native to the eastern Mediterranean, from Greece to the Sinai Peninsula.

== Species ==
21 species are accepted.

- Bolanthus aziz-sancarii Koç & Hamzaoglu
- Bolanthus chelmicus Phitos
- Bolanthus cherlerioides (Bornm.) Barkoudak
- Bolanthus confertifolius (Hub.-Mor.) Madhani & Heubl
- Bolanthus corinthiacus Kit Tan, Zarkos & Vold
- Bolanthus creutzburgii Greuter
- Bolanthus filicaulis (Boiss.) Barkoudak
- Bolanthus frankenioides (Boiss.) Barkoudah
- Bolanthus fruticulosus (Bory & Chaub.) Barkoudah
- Bolanthus graecus (Schreb.) Barkoudah
- Bolanthus hirsutus (Labill.) Barkoudah
- Bolanthus huber-morathii C.Simon
- Bolanthus laconicus (Boiss.) Barkoudah
- Bolanthus mevlanae Aytaç
- Bolanthus minuartioides (Jaub. & Spach) Hub.-Mor.
- Bolanthus sandrasicus Hamzaoglu & Koç
- Bolanthus spergulifolius (Jaub. & Spach) Hub.-Mor.
- Bolanthus stenopetalus Hartvig & Å.Strid
- Bolanthus thymifolius (Sm.) Phitos
- Bolanthus thymoides Hub.-Mor.
- Bolanthus turcicus Koç & Hamzaoglu
