= Thylacospermum =

Scientific classification
- Kingdom: Plantae
- Clade: Tracheophytes
- Clade: Angiosperms
- Clade: Eudicots
- Order: Caryophyllales
- Family: Caryophyllaceae
- Genus: Thylacospermum; Fenzl

Genus of flowering plants

Thylacospermum is a genus of flowering plants belonging to the family Caryophyllaceae.

Its native range is Central Asia to Central China and Himalaya.

Species:

- Thylacospermum caespitosum (Cambess.) Schischk.
- Thylacospermum rupifragum (Kar. & Kir.) Schrenk
