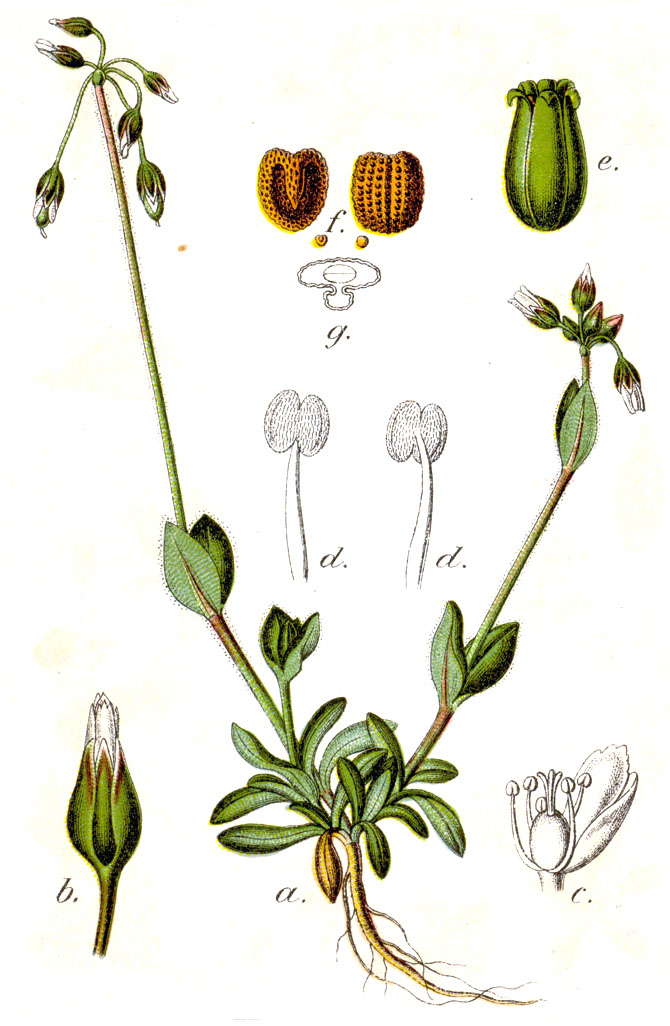
- Holosteum umbellatum

Scientific classification
- Kingdom: Plantae
- Clade: Tracheophytes
- Clade: Angiosperms
- Clade: Eudicots
- Order: Caryophyllales
- Family: Caryophyllaceae
- Genus: Holosteum; L.

Species
- See text

= Holosteum =

Genus of flowering plants in the carnation family

Holosteum is a genus of plants in the family Caryophyllaceae with 3 or 4 species native from southern Europe through central and south western Asia and in Africa. They are herbs with an annual life span, some growing as winter annuals. They have slender roots and thin stems that are upright or ascending. The genus name was given by Linnaeus, and named because of the sprawling nature of the plants: Greek holos, meaning whole or all, and osteon, meaning bone, because of the frailty of the plant.

Flowers are bisexual but sometimes also unisexual and pistillate. Flowers are hypogynous, have 5 sepals that are distinct and green in color and lanceolate to ovate in shape and 2.5–4.5 mm long. Typically with no stipules. The flowers have 5 petals that are white to soft pink in color and are clawed. Plants typically are found as small inconspicuous early spring blooming plants with short life spans.

Common names for the plants in this genus include jagged chickweeds.

== Species ==
- Holosteum klopotovii (Tzvelev) Tzvele
- Holosteum kobresietorum Rech.f.
- Holosteum marginatum C.A.Mey.
- Holosteum umbellatum L.
