= Habrosia =

Scientific classification
- Kingdom: Plantae
- Clade: Tracheophytes
- Clade: Angiosperms
- Clade: Eudicots
- Order: Caryophyllales
- Family: Caryophyllaceae
- Genus: Habrosia; Fenzl

Genus of plants

Habrosia is a genus of flowering plants belonging to the family Caryophyllaceae.

Its native range is Western Asia.

Species:

- Habrosia spinuliflora (Ser.) Fenzl
