= Cyathophylla =

Scientific classification
- Kingdom: Plantae
- Clade: Tracheophytes
- Clade: Angiosperms
- Clade: Eudicots
- Order: Caryophyllales
- Family: Caryophyllaceae
- Genus: Cyathophylla; Boquet & Strid

Genus of flowering plants

Cyathophylla is a genus of flowering plants belonging to the family Caryophyllaceae.

Its native range is Greece to Iran.

Species:

- Cyathophylla chlorifolia (Poir.) Bocquet & Strid
- Cyathophylla viscosa (C.A.Mey.) Madhani & Rabeler
