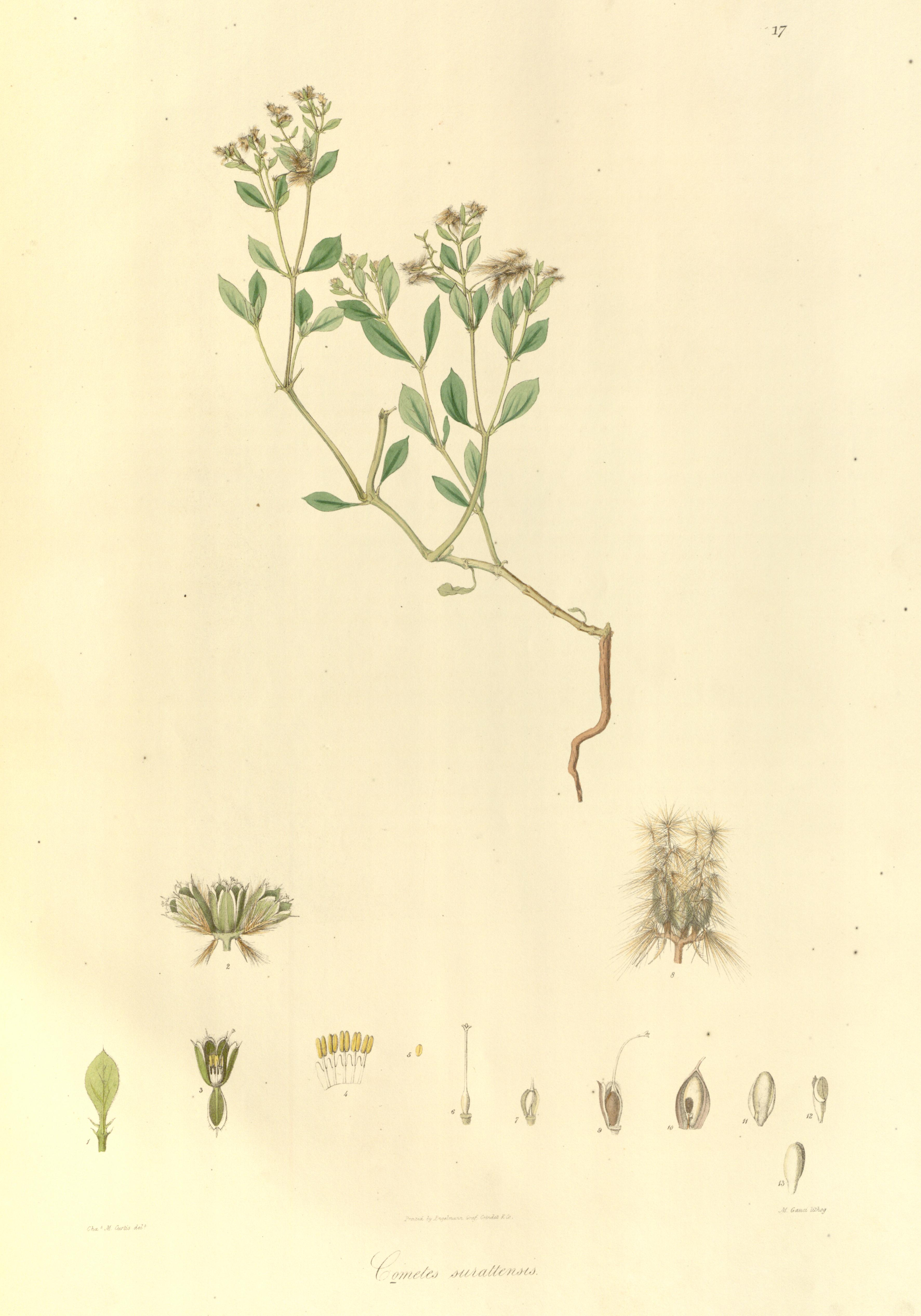
- Cometes surattensis

Scientific classification
- Kingdom: Plantae
- Clade: Tracheophytes
- Clade: Angiosperms
- Clade: Eudicots
- Order: Caryophyllales
- Family: Caryophyllaceae
- Genus: Cometes; L.

Species
- Cometes abyssinica R.Br. ex Wall.; Cometes surattensis Burm.f.

Synonyms
- Ceratonychia Edgew. (1847)

= Cometes (plant) =

Genus of flowering plants

Cometes is a genus of flowering plants in the carnation family, Caryophyllaceae. It includes two species native to eastern Africa, the Arabian Peninsula, Iran, Pakistan, and India.

- Cometes abyssinica R.Br. ex Wall. – Arabian Peninsula, Egypt, Sudan, and the Horn of Africa
- Cometes surattensis Burm.f. – Arabian Peninsula, Iran, Pakistan, and India
