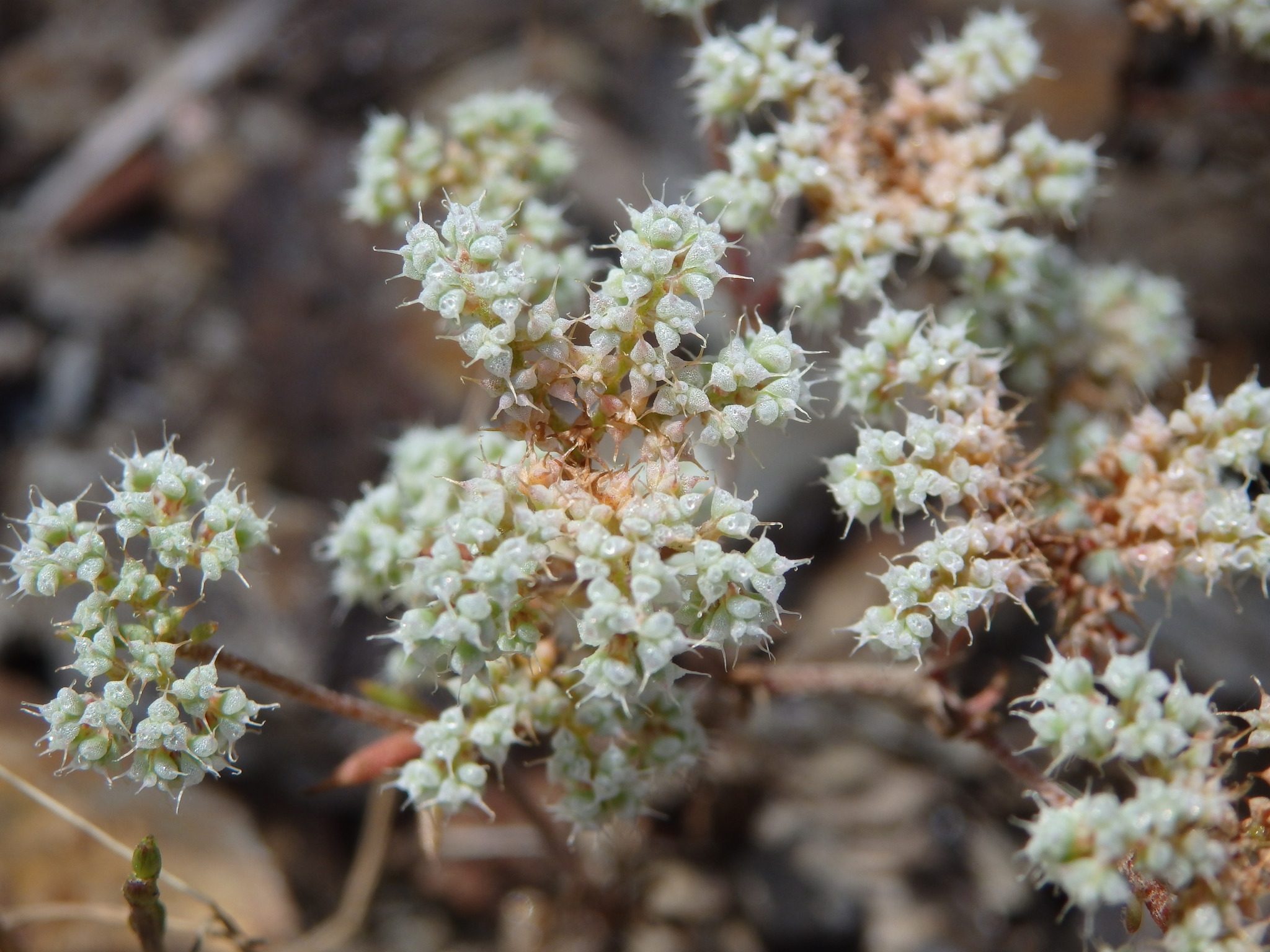

Scientific classification
- Kingdom: Plantae
- Clade: Tracheophytes
- Clade: Angiosperms
- Clade: Eudicots
- Order: Caryophyllales
- Family: Caryophyllaceae
- Genus: Chaetonychia (DC.) Sweet
- Species: C. cymosa

Binomial name
- Chaetonychia cymosa (L.) Sweet

= Chaetonychia =

Chaetonychia cymosa

Genus of flowering plants

Chaetonychia is a genus of flowering plants belonging to the family Caryophyllaceae. It is monotypic, being represented by the single species Chaetonychia cymosa. Its native range is the western Mediterranean.
