= Selleola =

Scientific classification
- Kingdom: Plantae
- Clade: Tracheophytes
- Clade: Angiosperms
- Clade: Eudicots
- Order: Caryophyllales
- Family: Caryophyllaceae
- Genus: Selleola; Urb.
- Species: S. ekmaniana

Binomial name
- Selleola ekmaniana Urb.

Genus of plants

Selleola is a monotypic genus of flowering plants belonging to the family Caryophyllaceae. The only species is Selleola ekmaniana.

Its native range is Haiti.
