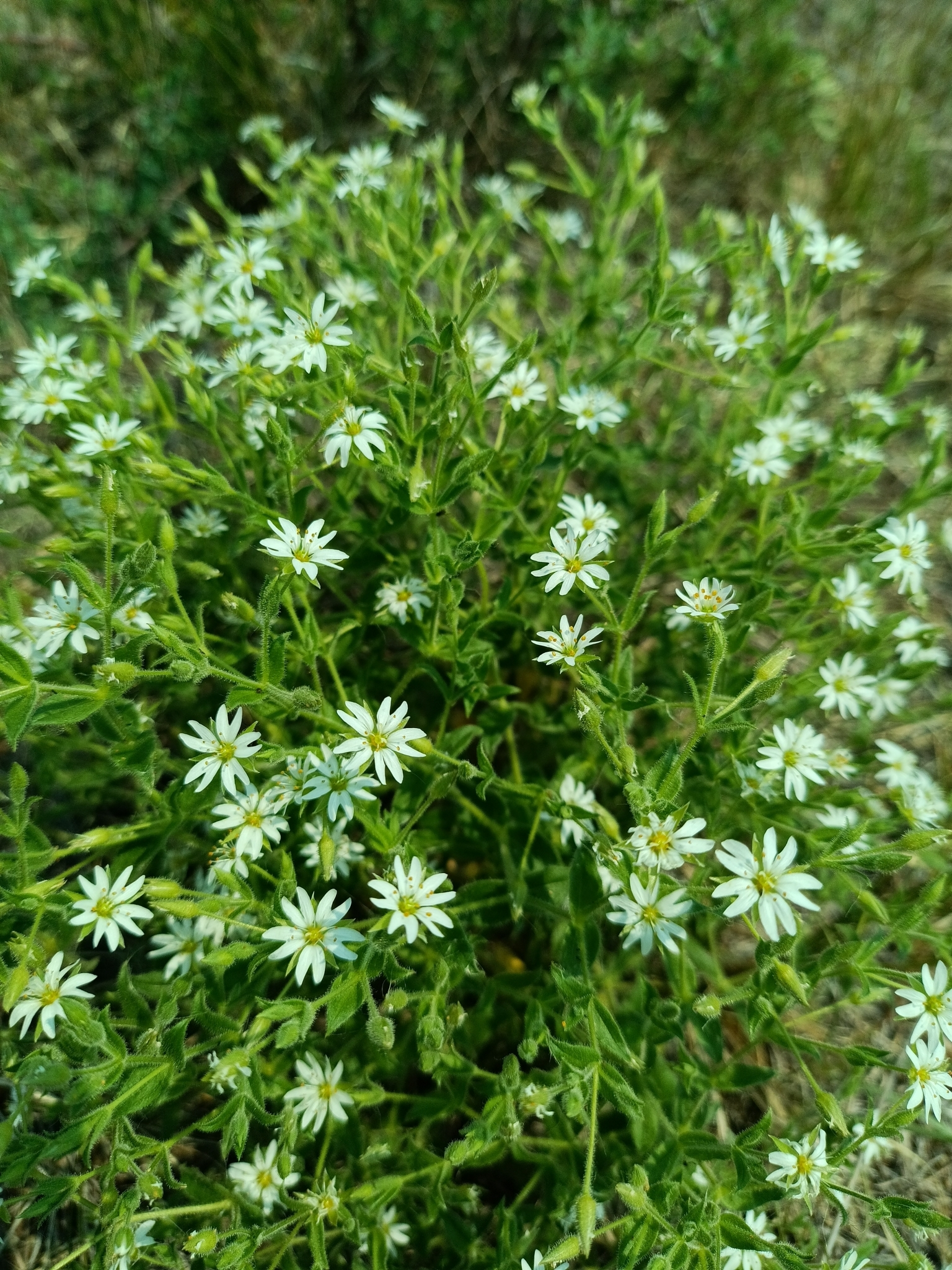
- Mesostemma dichotomum

Scientific classification
- Kingdom: Plantae
- Clade: Tracheophytes
- Clade: Angiosperms
- Clade: Eudicots
- Order: Caryophyllales
- Family: Caryophyllaceae
- Genus: Mesostemma; Vved.

= Mesostemma =

Genus of plants

Mesostemma is a genus of flowering plants belonging to the family Caryophyllaceae. Its native range is from eastern Turkey to south-western Siberia and the Himalayas.

== Species ==
The following species are recognised in the genus Mesostemma:

- Mesostemma alexeenkoanum (Schischk.) Ikonn.
- Mesostemma gypsophiloides (Fenzl) M.T.Sharples & E.A.Tripp
- Mesostemma karatavicum (Schischk.) Vved.
- Mesostemma kotschyanum (Fenzl ex Boiss.) Vved.
- Mesostemma latifolium (Benth. ex G.Don) Ikonn.
- Mesostemma martjanovii (Krylov) Ikonn.
- Mesostemma perfoliatum (Rech.f.) Rech.f.
- Mesostemma platyphyllum (Rech.f.) Rech.f.
- Mesostemma schugnanicum (Schischk.) Ikonn.
