= Brachystemma =

Scientific classification
- Kingdom: Plantae
- Clade: Tracheophytes
- Clade: Angiosperms
- Clade: Eudicots
- Order: Caryophyllales
- Family: Caryophyllaceae
- Genus: Brachystemma; D.Don
- Species: B. calycinum

Binomial name
- Brachystemma calycinum D.Don

Species of plant

Brachystemma calycinum is a species of plant in the pink family (Caryophyllaceae) that is native to southwestern China. It is the only species in the monotypic genus Brachystemma.
