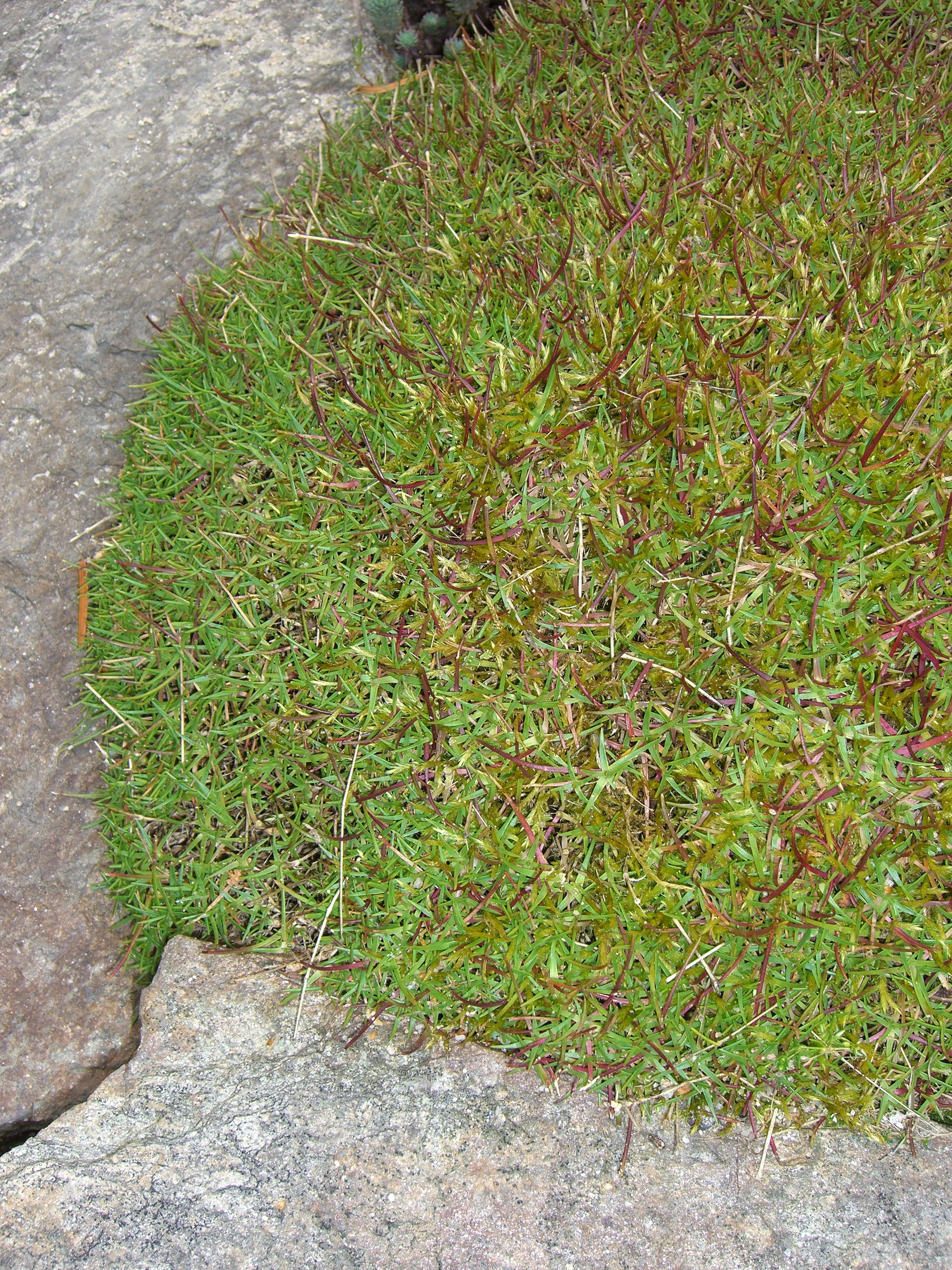
- Heterochroa petraea

Scientific classification
- Kingdom: Plantae
- Clade: Tracheophytes
- Clade: Angiosperms
- Clade: Eudicots
- Order: Caryophyllales
- Family: Caryophyllaceae
- Genus: Heterochroa; Bunge (1830)

Species
- see text

= Heterochroa =

Genus of flowering plants

Heterochroa is a genus of flowering plants in the carnation family, Caryophyllaceae. It includes six species native to temperate Eurasia, ranging from Iran to Central Asia, Mongolia, Siberia, and the Russian Far East.

== Species ==
Six species are accepted.

- Heterochroa antoninae (Schischk.) Madhani & Zarre
- Heterochroa desertorum Bunge
- Heterochroa microphylla Schrenk ex Fisch. & C.A.Mey.
- Heterochroa petraea Bunge
- Heterochroa turkestanica (Schischk.) Madhani & Zarre
- Heterochroa violacea (Ledeb.) Walp.
