= Bufonia =

Scientific classification
- Kingdom: Plantae
- Clade: Tracheophytes
- Clade: Angiosperms
- Clade: Eudicots
- Order: Caryophyllales
- Family: Caryophyllaceae
- Genus: Bufonia; Sauvage

Genus of flowering plants

Bufonia is a genus of flowering plants belonging to the family Caryophyllaceae.

Its native range is Macaronesia, Europe, Mediterranean to Central Asia.

Species:

- Bufonia alinihatii Özdeniz
- Bufonia anatolica Chrtek & Krísa
- Bufonia calderae Chrtek & Krísa
- Bufonia calyculata Boiss. & Balansa
- Bufonia capitata Bornm.
- Bufonia capsularis Boiss. & Hausskn.
- Bufonia chevalieri Batt.
- Bufonia darvishii Zeraatkar
- Bufonia duvaljouvei Batt. & Trab.
- Bufonia elata Boiss.
- Bufonia elatior (Chrtek & Křísa) Menemen
- Bufonia enervis Boiss.
- Bufonia ephedrina Sam. ex Rech.f.
- Bufonia hebecalyx Boiss.
- Bufonia iranica Z.Rostami, Assadi & F.Ghahrem.
- Bufonia koelzii Rech.f.
- Bufonia kotschyana Boiss.
- Bufonia leptoclada Rech.f.
- Bufonia macrocarpa Ser.
- Bufonia macropetala Willk.
- Bufonia micrantha Boiss. & Hausskn.
- Bufonia multiceps Decne.
- Bufonia murbeckii Emb.
- Bufonia oliveriana Ser.
- Bufonia ophiolithica Ristow, J.Krause & Rätzel
- Bufonia pabotii Chrtek & Křísa
- Bufonia paniculata Dubois
- Bufonia parviflora Griseb.
- Bufonia perennis Pourr.
- Bufonia ramonensis Danin
- Bufonia sintenisii Freyn
- Bufonia stapfii Bornm.
- Bufonia stricta (Sm.) Gürke
- Bufonia takhtajanii Nersesian
- Bufonia tenuifolia L.
- Bufonia virgata Boiss.
- Bufonia yildirimhanii Ilçim & Behçet
