= Thurya =

Scientific classification
- Kingdom: Plantae
- Clade: Tracheophytes
- Clade: Angiosperms
- Clade: Eudicots
- Order: Caryophyllales
- Family: Caryophyllaceae
- Genus: Thurya; Boiss. & Balansa
- Species: T. capitata

Binomial name
- Thurya capitata Boiss. & Balansa

Species of flowering plant

Thurya is a monotypic genus of flowering plant belonging to the family Caryophyllaceae. It only contains one known species, Thurya capitata.

It is native to Turkey.

The genus name of Thurya is in honour of Jean Marc Antoine Thury (1822–1905), a Swiss naturalist and professor of botany at the University of Geneva. The Latin specific epithet of capitata means having dense-headed growth and is derived from capitatus. Both the genus and the species were first described and published in P.E.Boissier, Diagn. Pl. Orient., series.2, Vol.5 on pages 63-64 in 1856.
