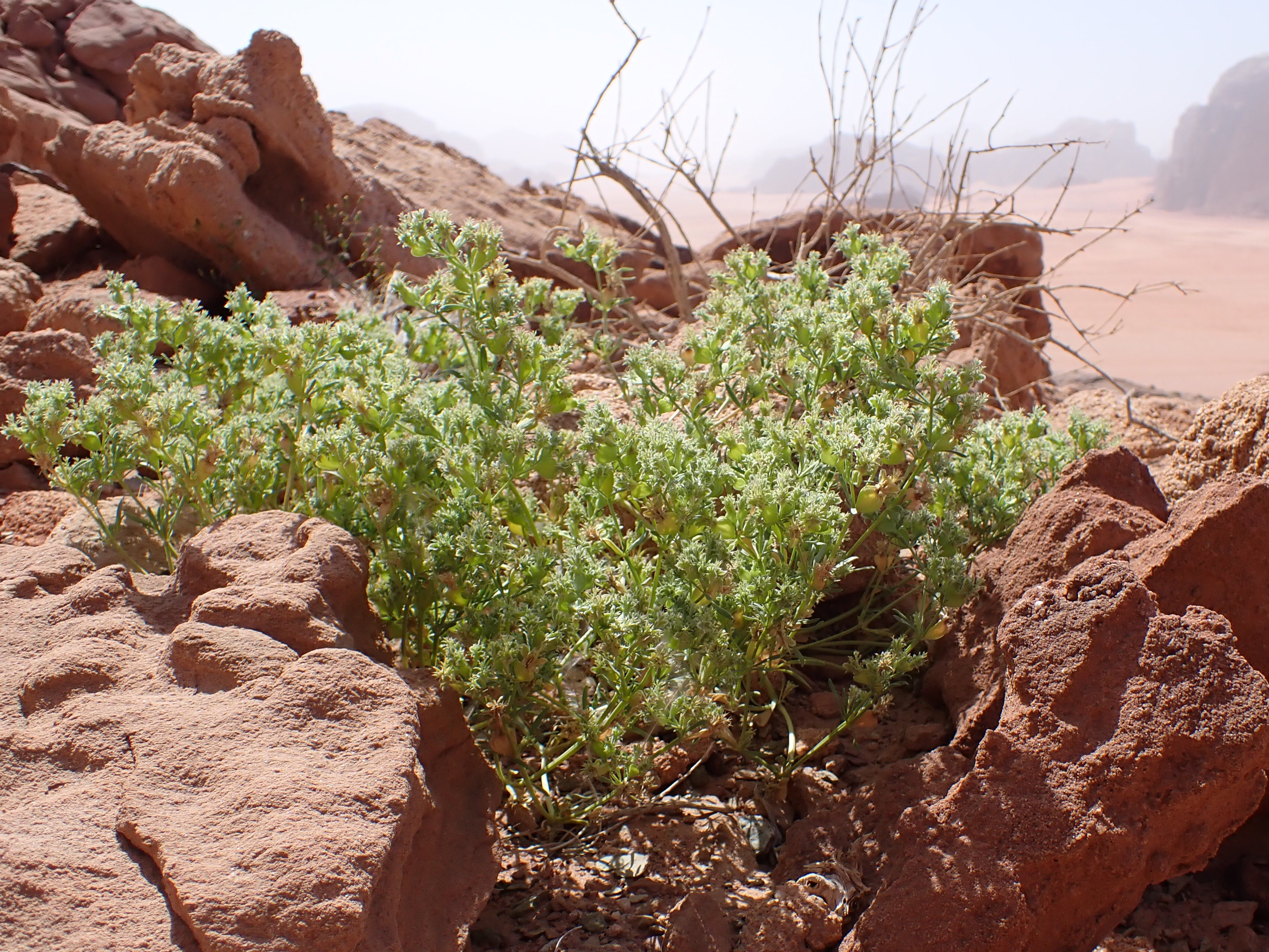
- Pteranthus dichotomus in Wadi Rum in Jordan

Scientific classification
- Kingdom: Plantae
- Clade: Tracheophytes
- Clade: Angiosperms
- Clade: Eudicots
- Order: Caryophyllales
- Family: Caryophyllaceae
- Genus: Pteranthus; Forssk.
- Species: P. dichotomus

Binomial name
- Pteranthus dichotomus Forssk.

= Pteranthus =

Genus of flowering plants

Pteranthus is a monotypic genus of flowering plants belonging to the family Caryophyllaceae. The only species is Pteranthus dichotomus.

Its native range is Canary Islands, the Mediterranean to Pakistan and the Arabian Peninsula.
