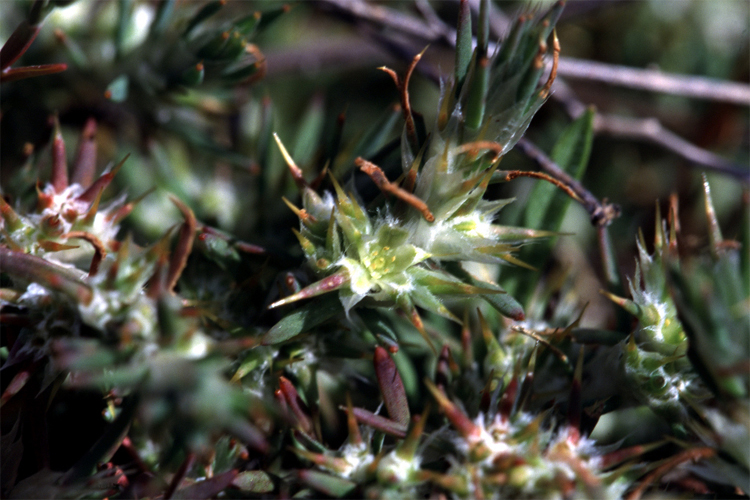
- Cardionema ramosissimum

Scientific classification
- Kingdom: Plantae
- Clade: Tracheophytes
- Clade: Angiosperms
- Clade: Eudicots
- Order: Caryophyllales
- Family: Caryophyllaceae
- Genus: Loeflingia; L.

= Loeflingia =

Genus of flowering plants

Loeflingia is a genus of plant in the family Caryophyllaceae occurring in North America, Europe, northern Africa, and southwestern Asia. Plants of the genus bear bristle-like stipules, as well as axillary, sessile flowers with awned sepals and no or vestigial petals. The fruit is a three-valved capsule.

== Species ==
Species include the following:

- Loeflingia baetica Lag.
- Loeflingia hispanica L.
- Loeflingia squarrosa Nutt.
- Loeflingia tavaresiana Samp.
