= Himgiria =

Scientific classification
- Kingdom: Plantae
- Clade: Tracheophytes
- Clade: Angiosperms
- Clade: Eudicots
- Order: Caryophyllales
- Family: Caryophyllaceae
- Genus: Himgiria; Pusalkar & D.K.Singh (2015)
- Species: H. compressa

Binomial name
- Himgiria compressa (McNeill) Pusalkar & D.K.Singh (2015)

Synonyms
- Arenaria compressa McNeill (1962); Arenaria lanceolatifolia L.H.Zhou (1980); Arenaria trichotoma Royle ex Hook.f. (1874), nom. illeg.

Genus of flowering plants

Himgiria compressa is a species of flowering plant in the carnation family, Caryophyllaceae. It is the sole species in genus Himgiria. It is a subshrub native to Afghanistan, northern Pakistan, the western Himalayas, and Tibet, where it grows in subalpine areas.
