= Krauseola =

Scientific classification
- Kingdom: Plantae
- Clade: Tracheophytes
- Clade: Angiosperms
- Clade: Eudicots
- Order: Caryophyllales
- Family: Caryophyllaceae
- Genus: Krauseola; Pax & K.Hoffm.

Synonyms
- Pleiosepalum Moss

Genus of flowering plant

Krauseola is a genus of flowering plants belonging to the family Caryophyllaceae. It includes two species of annual or perennial herbs native to Ethiopia, Kenya, Mozambique, and KwaZulu-Natal province of South Africa.

The genus name of Krauseola is in honour of Johannes Krause (1900–1979), a German botanist.

It was first described and published in H.G.A.Engler, Nat. Pflanzenfam. ed.2, 16c on page 308 in 1934.

Known species, according to Kew:

- Krauseola gillettii Turrill – Ethiopia and northeastern Kenya
- Krauseola mosambicina (Moss) Pax & K.Hoffm. – Mozambique and KwaZulu-Natal
