= Polytepalum =

Scientific classification
- Kingdom: Plantae
- Clade: Tracheophytes
- Clade: Angiosperms
- Clade: Eudicots
- Order: Caryophyllales
- Family: Caryophyllaceae
- Genus: Polytepalum; Suess. & Beyerle (1938)
- Species: P. angolense

Binomial name
- Polytepalum angolense Suess. & Beyerle (1938)

Genus of flowering plants

Polytepalum angolense is a species of flowering plant belonging to the family Caryophyllaceae. It is endemic to Angola. It is the sole species in genus Polytepalum.
