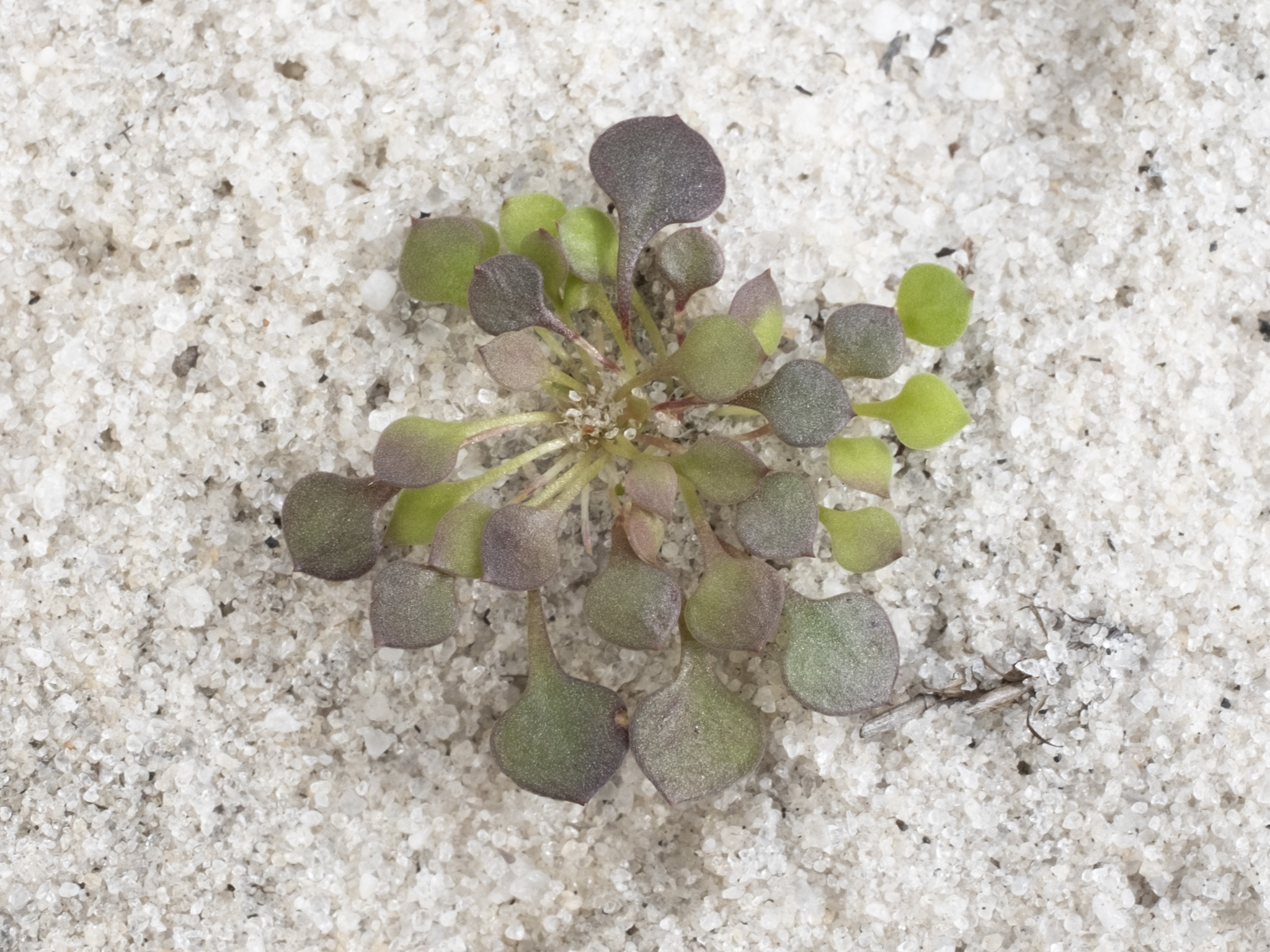
- Stipulicida setacea

Scientific classification
- Kingdom: Plantae
- Clade: Tracheophytes
- Clade: Angiosperms
- Clade: Eudicots
- Order: Caryophyllales
- Family: Caryophyllaceae
- Genus: Stipulicida; Michx.

= Stipulicida =

Genus of plants

Stipulicida is a genus of flowering plants belonging to the family Caryophyllaceae.

Its native range is the Southeastern US and Cuba.

Species:

- Stipulicida lacerata (C.W.James) D.B.Poind., K.E.Benn. & Weakley
- Stipulicida setacea Michx.
