= Pentastemonodiscus =

Scientific classification
- Kingdom: Plantae
- Clade: Tracheophytes
- Clade: Angiosperms
- Clade: Eudicots
- Order: Caryophyllales
- Family: Caryophyllaceae
- Genus: Pentastemonodiscus; Rech.f.
- Species: P. monochlamydeus

Binomial name
- Pentastemonodiscus monochlamydeus Rech.f.

Genus of plants

Pentastemonodiscus is a monotypic genus of flowering plants belonging to the family Caryophyllaceae. The only species is Pentastemonodiscus monochlamydeus.

Its native range is Afghanistan.
