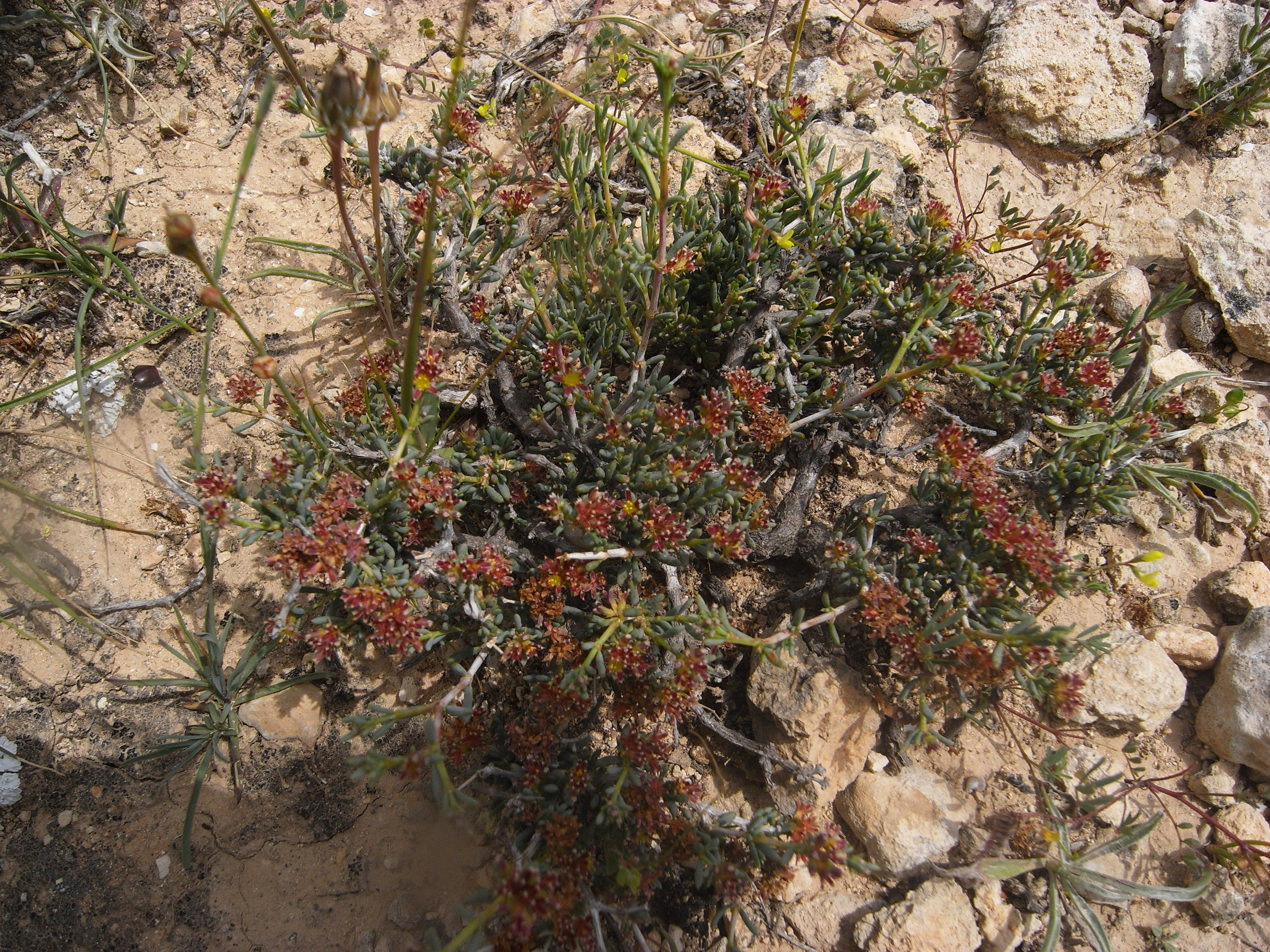
- Gymnocarpos decander

Scientific classification
- Kingdom: Plantae
- Clade: Tracheophytes
- Clade: Angiosperms
- Clade: Eudicots
- Order: Caryophyllales
- Family: Caryophyllaceae
- Genus: Gymnocarpos; Forssk.

= Gymnocarpos =

Genus of flowering plants

Gymnocarpos is a genus of plants in the family Caryophyllaceae.

== Selected species ==
It contains the following species (but this list may be incomplete):

- Gymnocarpos bracteatus (Balf.f.) Thulin
- Gymnocarpos kuriensis (Radcl.-Sm.) Thulin
