= Minuartiella =

Scientific classification
- Kingdom: Plantae
- Clade: Tracheophytes
- Clade: Angiosperms
- Clade: Eudicots
- Order: Caryophyllales
- Family: Caryophyllaceae
- Genus: Minuartiella; Dillenb. & Kadereit

Genus of plants

Minuartiella is a genus of flowering plants belonging to the family Caryophyllaceae.

Its native range is Turkey to Iran.

== Species ==
Species:

- Minuartiella acuminata (Turrill) Dillenb. & Kadereit
- Minuartiella × antalyensis (Parolly & Eren) Koç & Hamzaoglu
- Minuartiella dianthifolia (Boiss.) Dillenb. & Kadereit
- Minuartiella elmalia (Aytaç) Dillenb. & Kadereit
- Minuartiella pestalozzae (Boiss.) Dillenb. & Kadereit
- Minuartiella serpentinicola Koç & Hamzaoglu
