= Augustea =

Scientific classification
- Kingdom: Plantae
- Clade: Tracheophytes
- Clade: Angiosperms
- Clade: Eudicots
- Order: Caryophyllales
- Family: Caryophyllaceae
- Genus: Augustea; Iamonico (2015)

Species
- four; see text

Genus of flowering plants

for the type foundry and typeface, see Nebiolo Printech

Augustea is a genus of flowering plants in the carnation family, Caryophyllaceae. It includes four species native to South America, ranging from Bolivia and Paraguay to northern Argentina and central Chile.

== Species ==
Four species are accepted.

- Augustea anomala (Hassl.) Iamonico
- Augustea coquimbensis (Gereau & Martic.) Iamonico
- Augustea moreirana (Muñoz-Schick) Iamonico & Montesinos
- Augustea suffruticosa (Griseb.) Iamonico
