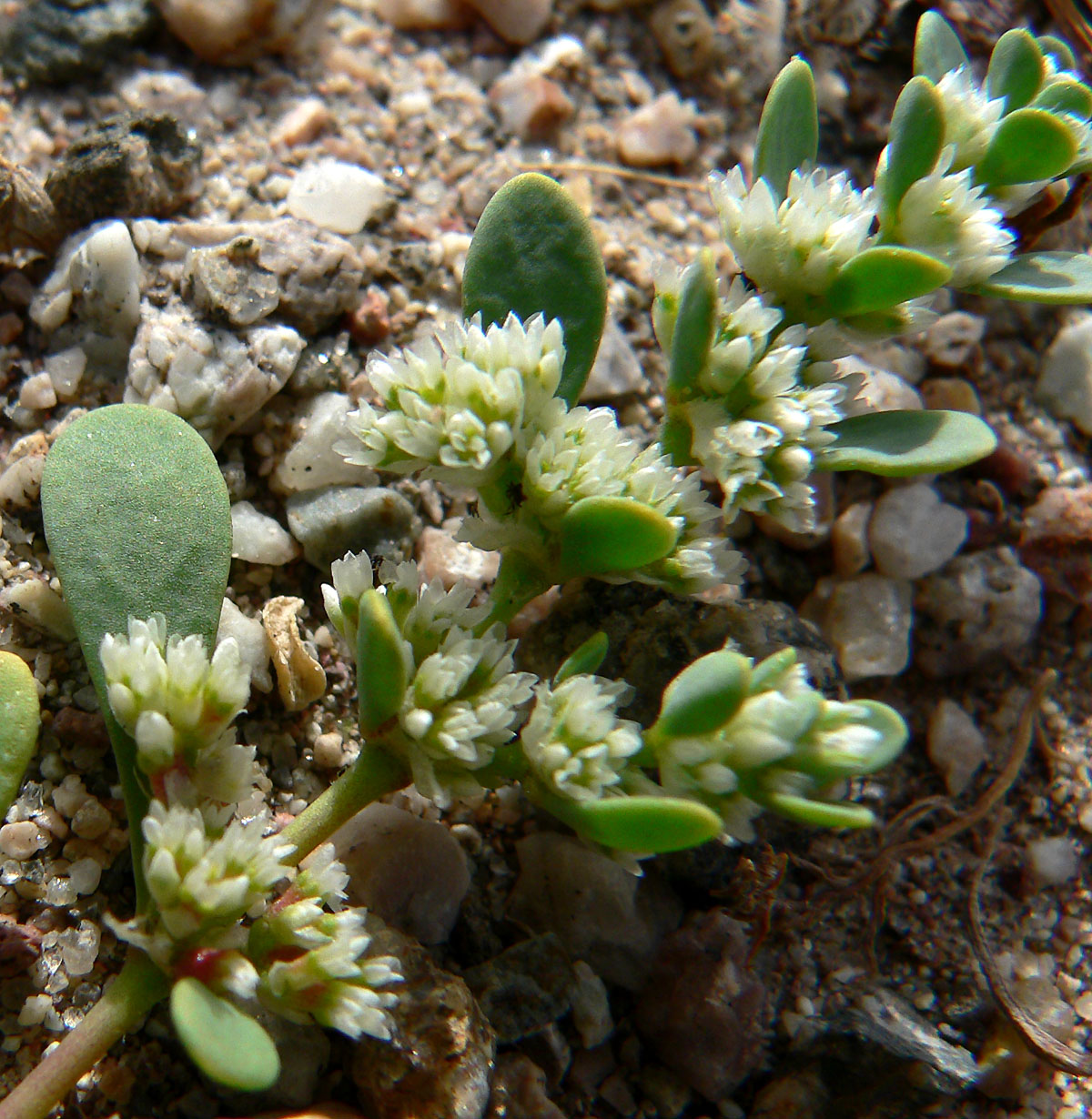
- Achyronychia cooperi

Conservation status
- Secure (NatureServe)

Scientific classification
- Kingdom: Plantae
- Clade: Embryophytes
- Clade: Tracheophytes
- Clade: Angiosperms
- Clade: Eudicots
- Order: Caryophyllales
- Family: Caryophyllaceae
- Genus: Achyronychia; Torr. & A.Gray
- Species: A. cooperi

Binomial name
- Achyronychia cooperi A.Gray

Synonyms
- Corrigiola litoralis L.

= Achyronychia =

Genus of flowering plants

Achyronychia is a monotypic genus of flowering plant containing the single species Achyronychia cooperi, which is known by the common names onyxflower and frost-mat. This plant is native to the Mojave and Sonoran Deserts of northern Mexico and the U.S. states of California, Nevada, Utah and Arizona. In California, it is known from San Diego, Imperial, Riverside, Los Angeles, San Bernardino and Inyo Counties. In Arizona, it occurs in Yuma, Mohave, Pima, Pinal and Maricopa Counties. It has also been reported from Washington County in Utah, and from Clark County, Nevada.

Onyxflower is a diminutive plant which lies in a small mat flat on the ground. Its habitat is sand. It radiates several prostrate stems in all directions, each only a few centimetres long. The thick pale green leaves are paddle-shaped and under 2 centimetres (0.79 in) long. In the leaf axils grow dense bunches of tiny flowers. There are no petals, but each flower has five thin shiny white sepals that look like tiny fingernails; the genus name Achyronychia is Greek for "chaff fingernail".
