= Kabulia akhtarii =

Scientific classification
- Kingdom: Plantae
- Clade: Tracheophytes
- Clade: Angiosperms
- Clade: Eudicots
- Order: Caryophyllales
- Family: Caryophyllaceae
- Genus: Kabulia; Bor & C.E.C.Fisch.
- Species: K. akhtarii

Binomial name
- Kabulia akhtarii Bor & C.E.C.Fisch.

Species of plant

Kabulia is a genus of flowering plants belonging to the family Caryophyllaceae. The only species is Kabulia akhtarii.

Its native range is Afghanistan.
