= Psammosilene =

Scientific classification
- Kingdom: Plantae
- Clade: Tracheophytes
- Clade: Angiosperms
- Clade: Eudicots
- Order: Caryophyllales
- Family: Caryophyllaceae
- Genus: Psammosilene; W.C.Wu & C.Y.Wu (1945)
- Species: P. tunicoides

Binomial name
- Psammosilene tunicoides W.C.Wu & C.Y.Wu (1945)

Synonyms
- Silene cryptantha Diels (1912), nom. illeg.

Genus of flowering plants

Psammosilene tunicoides is a species of flowering plant in the carnation family, Caryophyllaceae. It is the sole species in the genus Psammosilene. It is a perennial native to southeastern Tibet and southwestern Sichuan, Yunnan, and western Guizhou provinces in China, as well as to northern Thailand.
