= Microphyes =

Scientific classification
- Kingdom: Plantae
- Clade: Tracheophytes
- Clade: Angiosperms
- Clade: Eudicots
- Order: Caryophyllales
- Family: Caryophyllaceae
- Genus: Microphyes; Phil. (1860)

Species
- Microphyes litoralis Phil.; Microphyes minima (Miers ex Colla) Briq.; Microphyes robustus Ricardi

Synonyms
- Wangerinia E.Franz (1908)

Genus of flowering plants

Microphyes is a genus of flowering plants in the carnation family, Caryophyllaceae. It includes three species of annuals native to northern and central Chile and northeastern Argentina.

- Microphyes litoralis Phil. (1860) – northern Chile
- Microphyes minima (Miers ex Colla) Briq. – northern and north-Central Chile, Jujuy Province of northeastern Argentina
- Microphyes robustus Ricardi – north-central Chile (Coquimbo Region)
