= Shivparvatia =

Scientific classification
- Kingdom: Plantae
- Clade: Tracheophytes
- Clade: Angiosperms
- Clade: Eudicots
- Order: Caryophyllales
- Family: Caryophyllaceae
- Genus: Shivparvatia; Pusalkar & D.K.Singh

Synonyms
- Solitaria (McNeill) Sadeghian & Zarre, Bot. J. Linn. Soc. 178: 667 (2015)

Genus of plants

Shivparvatia is a genus of flowering plants belonging to the family Caryophyllaceae.

The genus name of Shivparvatia refers to both the Hindu god Shiv and Parvati, the Hindu goddess of power, energy, nourishment, harmony, love, beauty, devotion, and motherhood.

The genus was circumscribed by Prashant Keshav Pusalkar and Devendra Kumar Singh in J. Jap. Bot. vol.90 (Issue 2) on page 81 in 2015.

It is found in central China, the Himalayas, Nepal, Qinghai and Tibet.

Species:

- Shivparvatia ciliolata (Edgew. & Hook.f.) Pusalkar & D.K.Singh
- Shivparvatia forrestii (Diels) Rabeler
- Shivparvatia glanduligera (Edgew.) Pusalkar & D.K.Singh
- Shivparvatia ludlowii (H.Hara) Rabeler
- Shivparvatia melandryiformis (F.N.Williams) Satish Chandra & D.S.Rawat
- Shivparvatia melandryoides (Edgew.) Satish Chandra & D.S.Rawat
- Shivparvatia monantha (F.N.Williams) Satish Chandra & D.S.Rawat
- Shivparvatia ramellata (F.N.Williams) Rabeler
- Shivparvatia rhodantha (Pax & K.Hoffm.) Rabeler
- Shivparvatia stracheyi (Edgew.) Pusalkar & D.K.Singh
