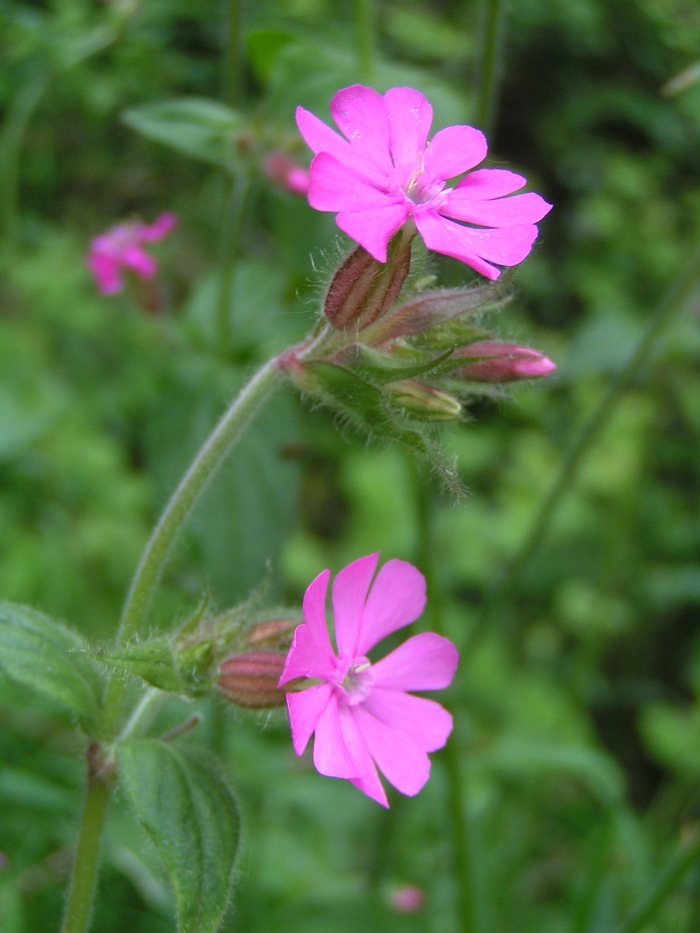
- Silene dioica

Scientific classification
- Kingdom: Plantae
- Clade: Tracheophytes
- Clade: Angiosperms
- Clade: Eudicots
- Order: Caryophyllales
- Family: Caryophyllaceae; Juss.

Genera
- Many, see text

Synonyms
- Telephieae D.C.

= Caryophyllaceae =

Family of flowering plants

Caryophyllaceae, commonly called the pink family or carnation family, is a family of flowering plants. It is included in the eudicot order Caryophyllales in the APG III system, alongside 33 other families, including Amaranthaceae, Cactaceae, and Polygonaceae. It is a large family, with 105 genera and about 2,625 known species.

This cosmopolitan family of mostly herbaceous plants is best represented in temperate climates, with a few species growing on tropical mountains. Some of the more commonly known members include pinks and carnations (Dianthus), and firepink and campions (Silene). Many species are grown as ornamental plants, and some species are widespread weeds. Most species grow in the Mediterranean and bordering regions of Europe and Asia. The number of genera and species in the Southern Hemisphere is rather small, although the family does contain Antarctic pearlwort (Colobanthus quitensis), the world's southernmost dicot, which is one of only two flowering plants found in Antarctica.

The name comes from Caryophyllus, an obsolete synonym of Dianthus.

== Description ==
Most are herbaceous annuals or perennials, dying off above ground each year. A few species are shrubs or small trees, such as some Acanthophyllum species. Most plants are non-succulent; i.e. having no fleshy stems or leaves. The nodes on the stem are swollen. The leaves are almost always opposite, rarely whorled. The blades are entire, petiolate, and often stipulate. These stipules are not sheath-forming.

The bisexual flowers are terminal, blooming singly or branched or forked in cymes. The inflorescence is usually dichasial at least in the lower parts, which means that in the axil of each peduncle (primary flower stalk) of the terminal flower in the cyme, two new single-flower branches sprout up on each side of and below the first flower. If the terminal flowers are absent, then this can lead to monochasia, i.e. a monoparous cyme with a single flower on each axis of the inflorescence. In the extreme, this leads to a single flower, such as in Githago or Arenaria. The flowers are regular and mostly with five petals and five sepals, but sometimes with four petals. The sepals may be free from one another or united. The petals may be entire, fringed or deeply cleft. The calyx may be cylindrically inflated, as in Silene. The stamens number five or 10 (or more rarely four or eight), and are mostly isomerous with the perianth. The superior gynoecium has two to five carpels (members of a compound pistil) and is syncarpous; i.e. with these carpels united in a compound ovary. This ovary has one chamber inside the ovary. The fruit may be a utricle with a single seed or a capsule containing several seeds.

== Systematics ==
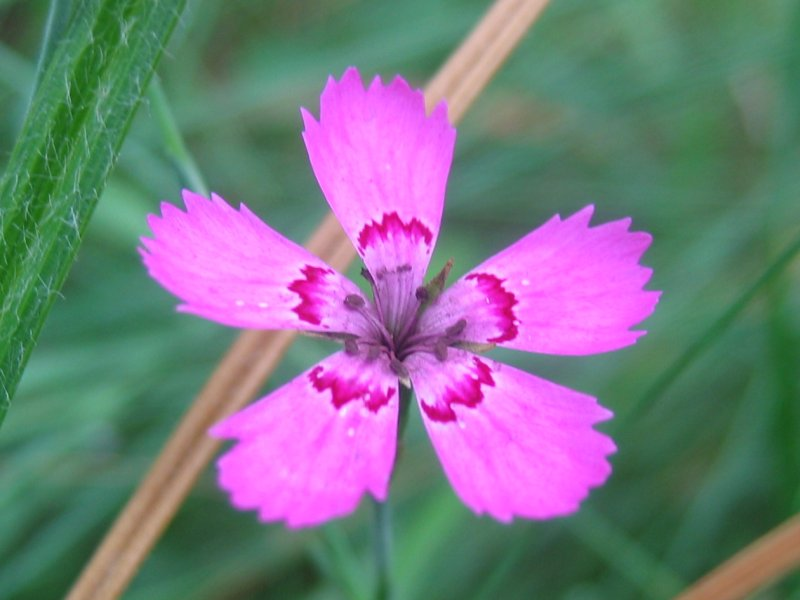
The "maiden pink", Dianthus deltoides, belongs to the core group of Silenoideae.

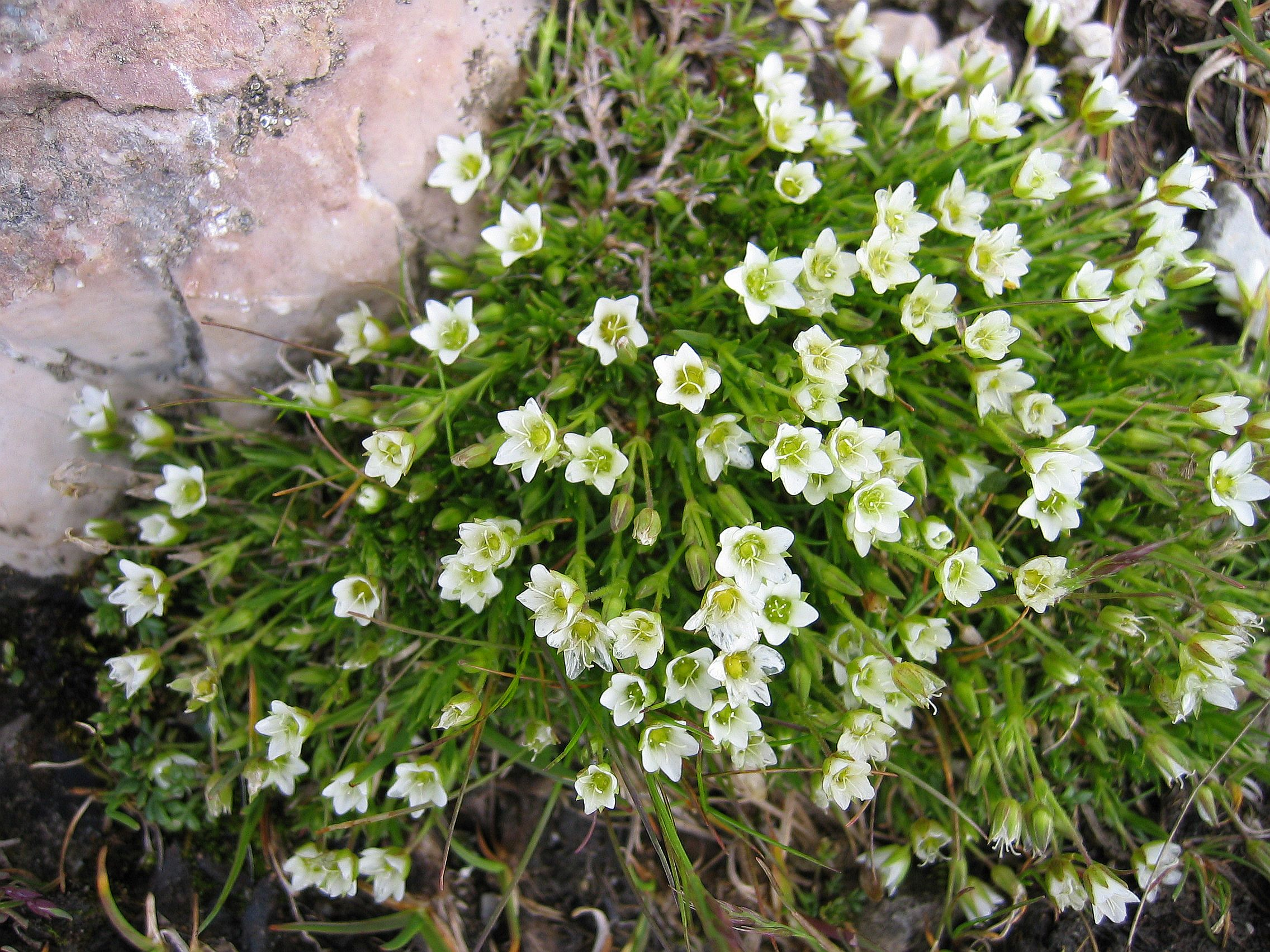
Minuartia gerardii belongs to a clade traditionally included in the Alsinoideae.

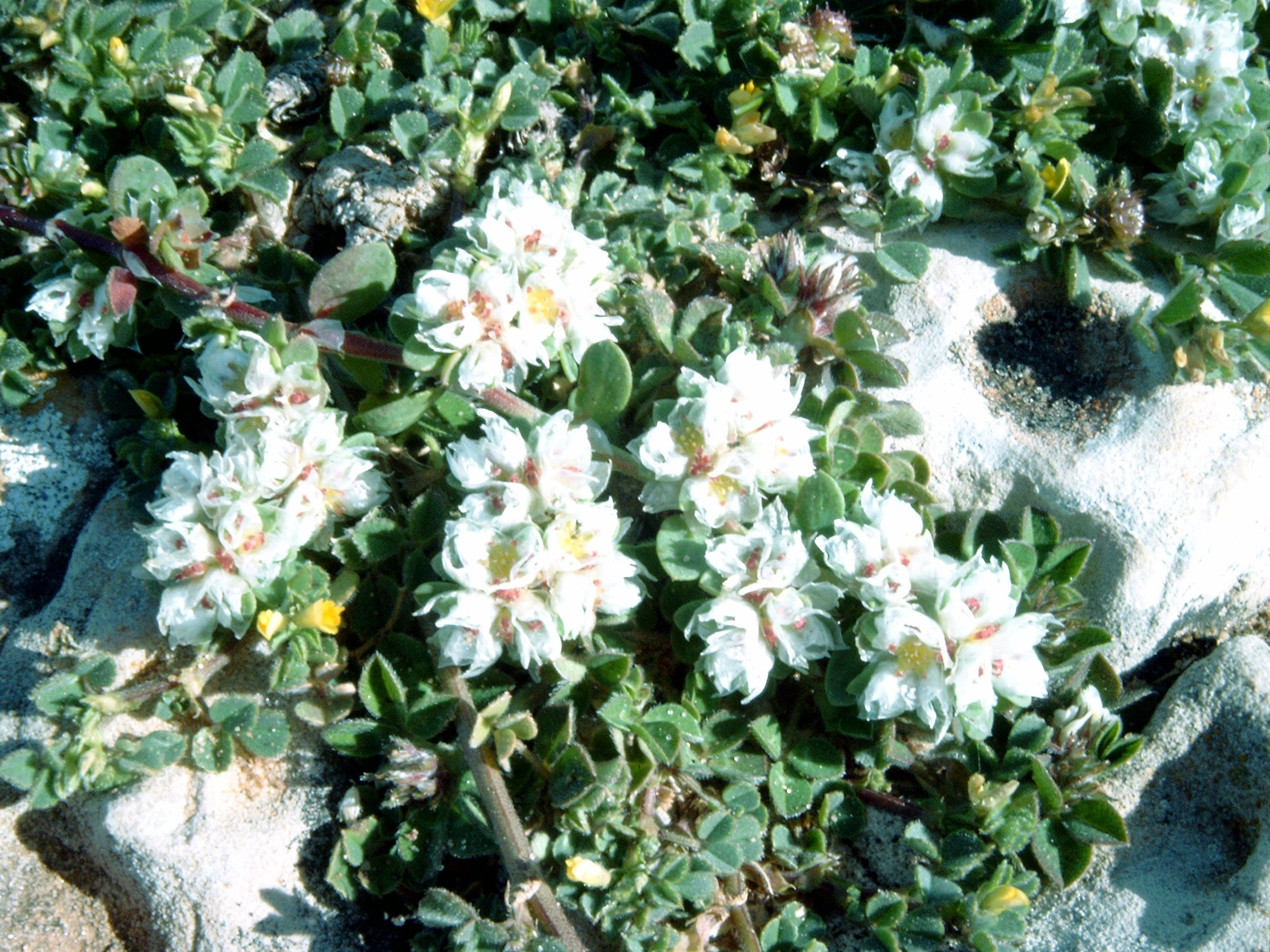
Paronychia argentea from the primitive Paronychioideae assemblage

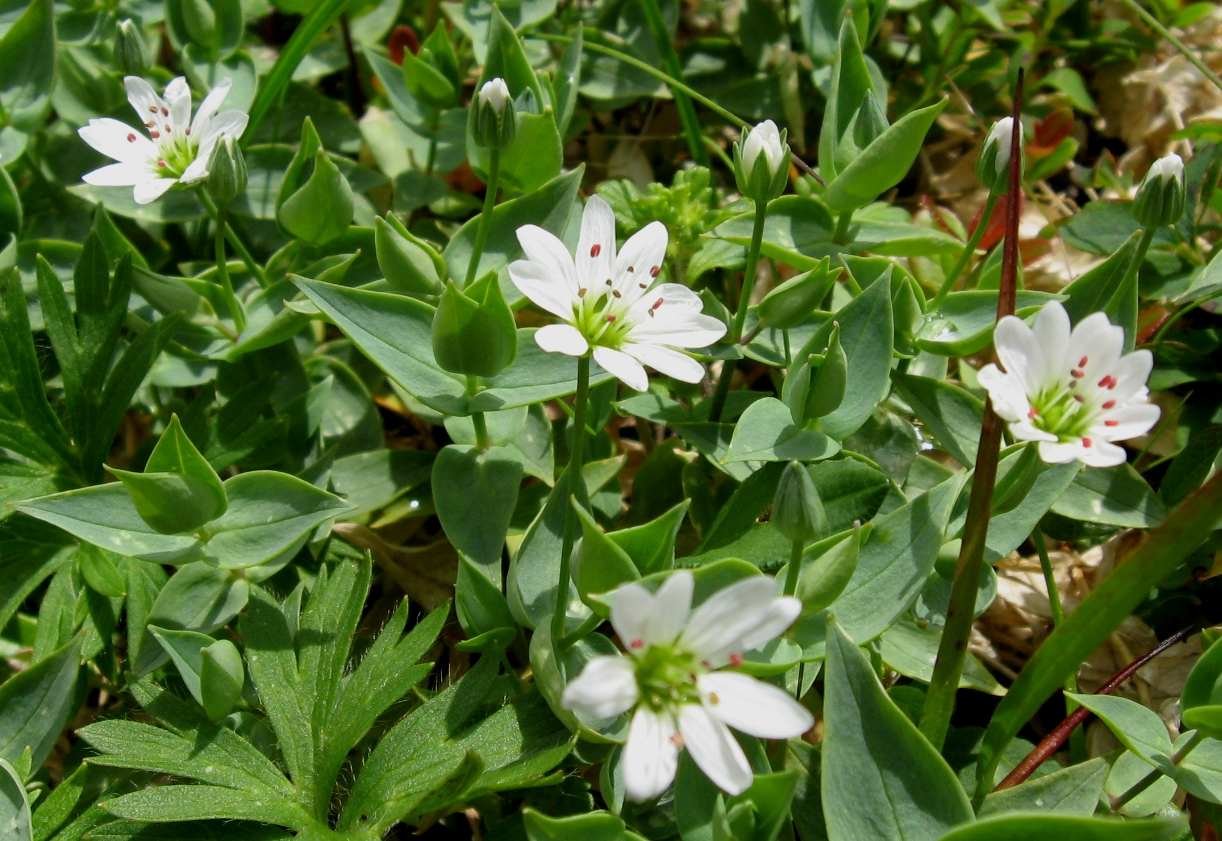
Stellaria ruscifolia is traditionally placed in the Alsinoideae, but may not be a close relative of Minuartia.

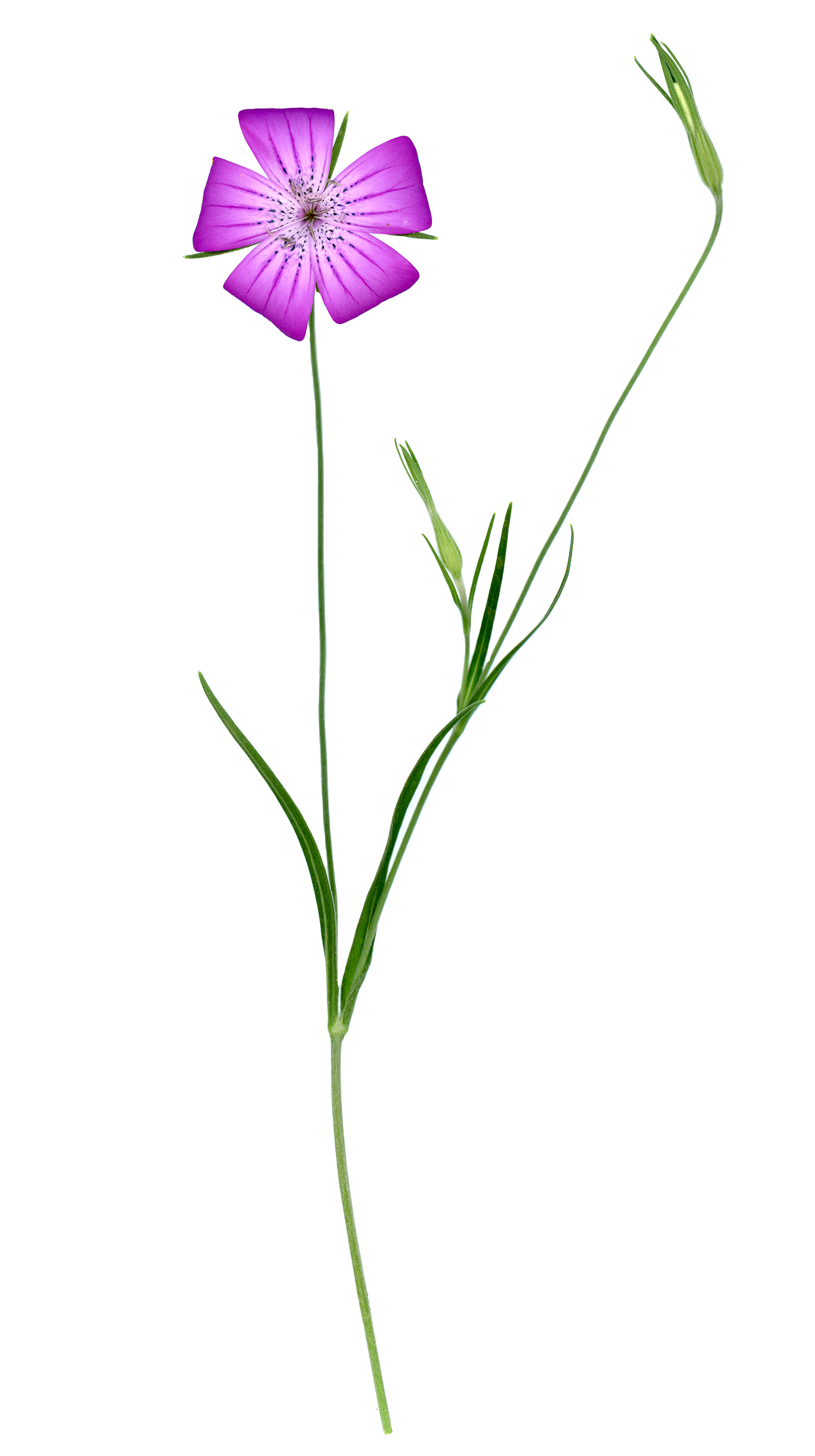
A botanical scan of Agrostemma gracile

As of 2026 and following the APG V system, Caryophyllaceae considered to be sister to a clade containing Amaranthaceae and Achatocarpaceae.

Formerly, Caryophyllaceae were considered the sister family to all of the remaining members of the suborder Caryophyllineae because they have anthocyanins, and not betalain pigments. However, cladistic analyses indicate Caryophyllaceae evolved from ancestors that contained betalain, reinforcing betalain as an accurate synapomorphy of the suborder.

This family is traditionally divided in three subfamilies:

- Alsinoideae: no stipules, petals not united
- Silenoideae: no stipules, petals united
- Paronychioideae: fleshy stipules, petals separate or united

The last, however, are a basal grade of rather primitive members of this family, not closely related, but simply retaining many plesiomorphic traits. Instead of a subfamily, most ought to be treated as genera incertae sedis, but Corrigiola and Telephium might warrant recognition as Corrigioleae. The Alsinoideae, on the other hand, seem to form two distinct clades, perhaps less some misplaced genera. Finally, the Silenoideae appear monophyletic at least for the most part, if some of the taxa misplaced in Alsinoideae are moved there; it may be that the name Caryophylloideae would apply for the revised delimitation.

However, hybridization between many members of this family is rampant—particularly in the Silenoideae/Caryophylloideae—and some of the lineages of descent have been found to be highly complicated and do not readily yield to cladistic analysis.

=== Genera ===
107 genera are accepted.

- Tribe Alsineae
  - Adenonema Bunge
  - Brachystemma D.Don
  - Cerastium Tourn. ex L. – mouse-ear chickweeds
  - Dichodon (Bartl. ex Rchb.) Rchb.
  - Gypsophiloides Mahdavi & Assadi
  - Hartmaniella M.L.Zhang & Rabeler
  - Hesperostellaria Gang Yao, B.Xue & Z.Q.Song
  - Holosteum Dill. ex L. – jagged chickweeds
  - Lepyrodiclis Fenzl
  - Mesostemma Vved.
  - Moenchia Ehrh. – upright chickweeds
  - Nubelaria M.T.Sharples & E.A.Tripp
  - Odontostemma Benth. ex G.Don
  - Pseudostellaria Pax
  - Rabelera M.T.Sharples & E.A.Tripp
  - Reniostellaria Gang Yao, B.Xue & Z.Q.Song
  - Schizotechium (Fenzl) Rchb.
  - Shivparvatia Pusalkar & D.K.Singh
  - Stellaria L. – chickweeds, stitchworts
  - Torreyostellaria Gang Yao, B.Xue & Z.Q.Song
- Tribe Arenarieae
  - Arenaria Ruppius ex L. – sandworts
  - Moehringia L. – sandworts
  - Reicheella Pax
- Tribe Caryophylleae
  - Acanthophyllum C.A.Mey.
  - Balkana Madhani & Zarre
  - Bolanthus (Ser.) Rchb.
  - Cyathophylla Boquet & Strid
  - Dianthus L. – carnations and pinks
  - Gypsophila L. – gypsophilas, baby's-breath
  - Heterochroa Bunge
  - Jordania Boiss.
  - Petroana Madhani & Zarre
  - Petrorhagia (Ser.) Link
  - Psammophiliella Ikonn.
  - Psammosilene W.C.Wu & C.Y.Wu
  - Saponaria L. – soapworts
  - Yazdana A.Pirani & Noroozi
- Tribe Corrigioleae
  - Corrigiola L. – strapworts
  - Telephium L.
- Tribe Eremogoneae
  - Eremogone Fenzl
  - Himgiria Pusalkar & D.K.Singh
- Tribe Paronychieae
  - Gymnocarpos Forssk.
  - Herniaria Tourn. ex L. – ruptureworts
  - Paronychia Mill. – chickweeds
  - Philippiella Speg.
- Tribe Polycarpaeae
  - Achyronychia Torr. & A.Gray – onyxflower, frost-mat
  - Augustea Iamonico
  - Cardionema DC.
  - Cerdia Moc. & Sessé ex DC.
  - Chaetonychia (DC.) Sweet
  - Cometes L.
  - Dicheranthus Webb
  - Drymaria Willd. ex Schult.
  - Haya Balf.f
  - Illecebrum Ruppius ex L.
  - Krauseola Pax & K.Hoffm.
  - Loeflingia L.
  - Microphyes Phil.
  - Ortegia Loefl.
  - Pirinia M.Král
  - Pollichia Aiton
  - Polycarpaea Lam.
  - Polycarpon Loefl.
  - Polytepalum Suess. & Beyerle
  - Pteranthus Forssk.
  - Pycnophyllum J.Rémy
  - Scopulophila (Fenzl) Rchb.
  - Sphaerocoma T.Anderson
  - Stipulicida Michx.
  - Xerotia Oliv.
- Tribe Sagineae
  - Bufonia Sauvage
  - Colobanthus Bartl. – pearlworts
  - Drypis P.Michell ex L.
  - Facchinia Rchb.
  - Habrosia Fenzl
  - Mcneillia Dillenb. & Kadereit
  - Minuartia Loefl. – sandworts, stitchworts
  - Minuartiella Dillenb. & Kadereit
  - Sabulina Rchb.
  - Sagina L. – pearlworts
  - Thurya Boiss. & Balansa
- Tribe Sclerantheae
  - Cherleria L.
  - Engellaria Iamonico
  - Geocarpon Mack.
  - Honckenya Ehrh.
  - Maguirellaria Iamonico
  - Pentastemonodiscus Rech.f.
  - Pseudocherleria Dillenb. & Kadereit
  - Schiedea Cham. & Schltdl.
  - Scleranthus L. – knawels
  - Selleola Urb.
  - Triplateia Bartl.
  - Wilhelmsia Rchb.
- Tribe Sileneae
  - Agrostemma L. – corncockles
  - Atocion Adans.
  - Eudianthe (Rchb.) Rchb.
  - Heliosperma (Rchb.) Rchb.
  - Petrocoptis A.Braun ex Endl.
  - Silene L. – campions, catchflies
  - Viscaria Bernh.
- Tribe Sperguleae
  - Rhodalsine J.Gay
  - Spergula Dill ex L. – spurreys
  - Spergularia (Pers.) J.Presl & C.Presl – sea-spurreys
- Tribe Thylacospermeae
  - Dolophragma Fenzl.
  - Thylacospermum Fenzl
- Incertae sedis
  - Bolbosaponaria Bondarenko
  - Kabulia Bor & C.E.C.Fisch.

== Unplaced ==
- Dadjoua Parsa described in 1960 in Fl. Iran and accepted by Catalogue of life, but unplaced by Plants of the World Online.
