= List of Caryophyllales of Montana =

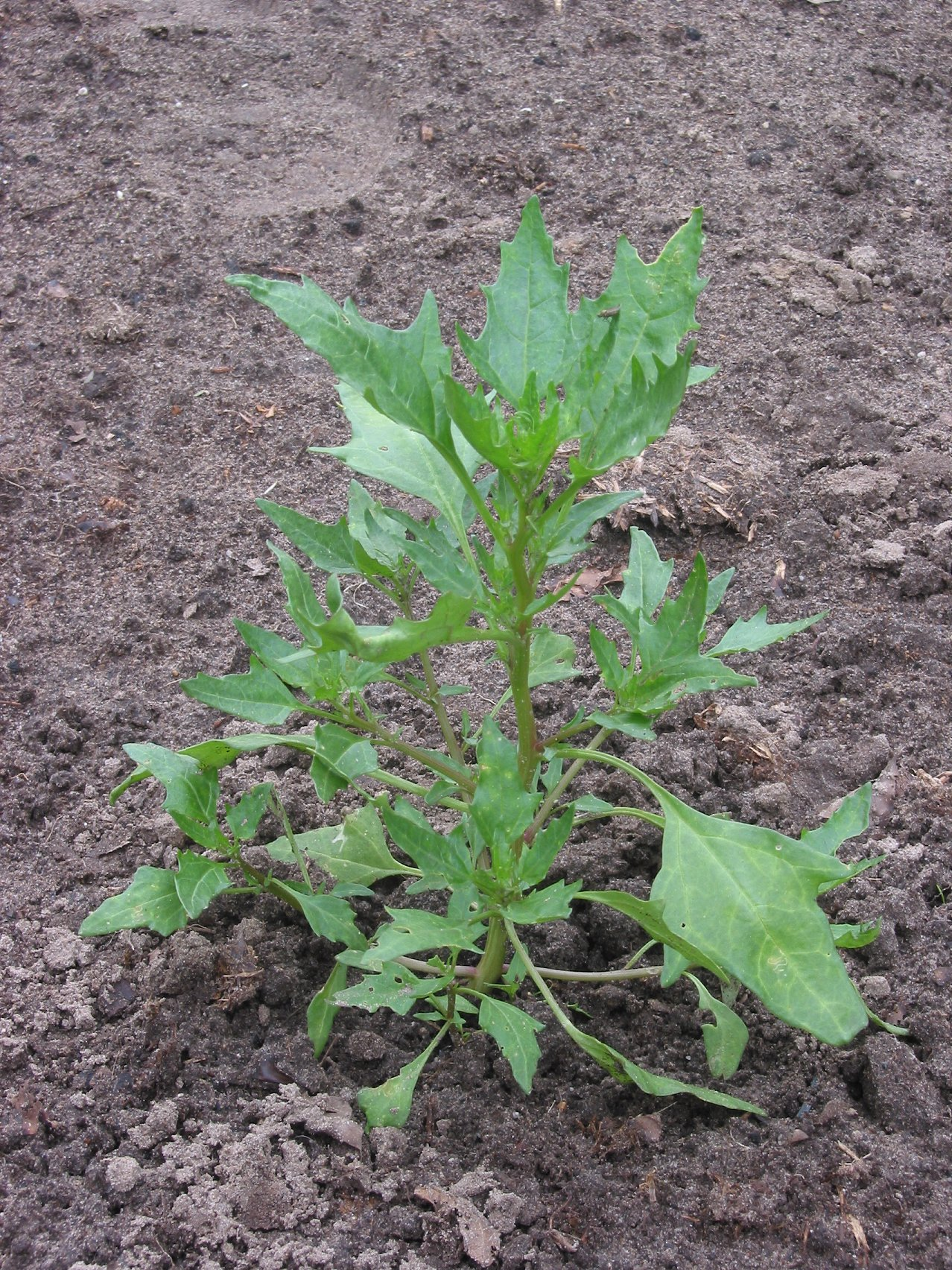
Red goosefoot, Chenopodium rubrum

There are at least 177 members of the order Caryophyllales found in Montana. Some of these species are exotics (not native to Montana) and some species have been designated as Species of Concern.

== Amaranth ==
Family: Amaranthaceae

- Amaranthus albus, white pigweed
- Amaranthus arenicola, sandhills amaranth
- Amaranthus blitoides, prostrate amaranth
- Amaranthus californicus, California amaranth
- Amaranthus hybridus, smooth amaranth
- Amaranthus powellii, green amaranth
- Amaranthus retroflexus, red-root pigweed
- Amaranthus tuberculatus, roughfruit amaranth
- Atriplex argentea, silvery saltbush
- Atriplex canescens, four-wing saltbush
- Atriplex confertifolia, shadscale
- Atriplex dioica, thickleaf orach
- Atriplex gardneri, Gardner's saltbush
- Atriplex gardneri var. falcata, sickle saltbush
- Atriplex heterosperma, two-scale saltbush
- Atriplex hortensis, garden orach
- Atriplex patula, halberd-leaf orache
- Atriplex powellii, Powell's saltbush
- Atriplex prostrata, creeping saltbush
- Atriplex rosea, tumbling orache
- Atriplex suckleyi, Suckley's saltbush
- Atriplex truncata, wedge-leaved saltbush
- Axyris amaranthoides, Russian-pigweed
- Bassia hyssopifolia, five-horn smotherweed
- Ceratoides lanata, winterfat
- Chenopodium album, white goosefoot
- Chenopodium atrovirens, dark goosefoot
- Chenopodium berlandieri, pit-seed goosefoot
- Chenopodium botrys, Jerusalem-oak
- Chenopodium capitatum, strawberry goosefoot
- Chenopodium capitatum var. parvicapitatum, Over's goosefoot
- Chenopodium chenopodioides, low goosefoot
- Chenopodium desiccatum, narrowleaf goosefoot
- Chenopodium fremontii, Fremont's goosefoot
- Chenopodium glaucum, oakleaf goosefoot
- Chenopodium glaucum var. salinum, Rocky Mountain goosefoot
- Chenopodium incanum, mealy goosefoot
- Chenopodium leptophyllum, narrowleaf goosefoot
- Chenopodium murale, nettle-leaf goosefoot
- Chenopodium pratericola, desert goosefoot
- Chenopodium rubrum, red goosefoot
- Chenopodium rubrum var. humile, marshland goosefoot
- Chenopodium rubrum var. rubrum, red goosefoot
- Chenopodium simplex, giant-seed goosefoot
- Chenopodium standleyanum, Standley's goosefoot
- Chenopodium subglabrum, smooth goosefoot
- Chenopodium watsonii, Watson's goosefoot
- Corispermum americanum, American bugseed
- Corispermum villosum, hairy bugseed
- Cycloloma atriplicifolium, winged pigweed
- Grayia spinosa, spiny hopsage
- Halogeton glomeratus, halogeton
- Kochia americana, red sage
- Kochia prostrata, prostrate summer-cypress
- Kochia scoparia, Mexican summer-cypress
- Monolepis nuttalliana, Nuttall's poverty-weed
- Salicornia rubra, western glasswort
- Salsola collina, slender Russian-thistle
- Salsola tragus, Russian-thistle
- Suaeda calceoliformis, American sea-blite
- Suaeda moquinii, Mojave sea-blite
- Suaeda occidentalis, slender seepweed
- Suckleya suckleyana, poison suckleya

== Cactus ==
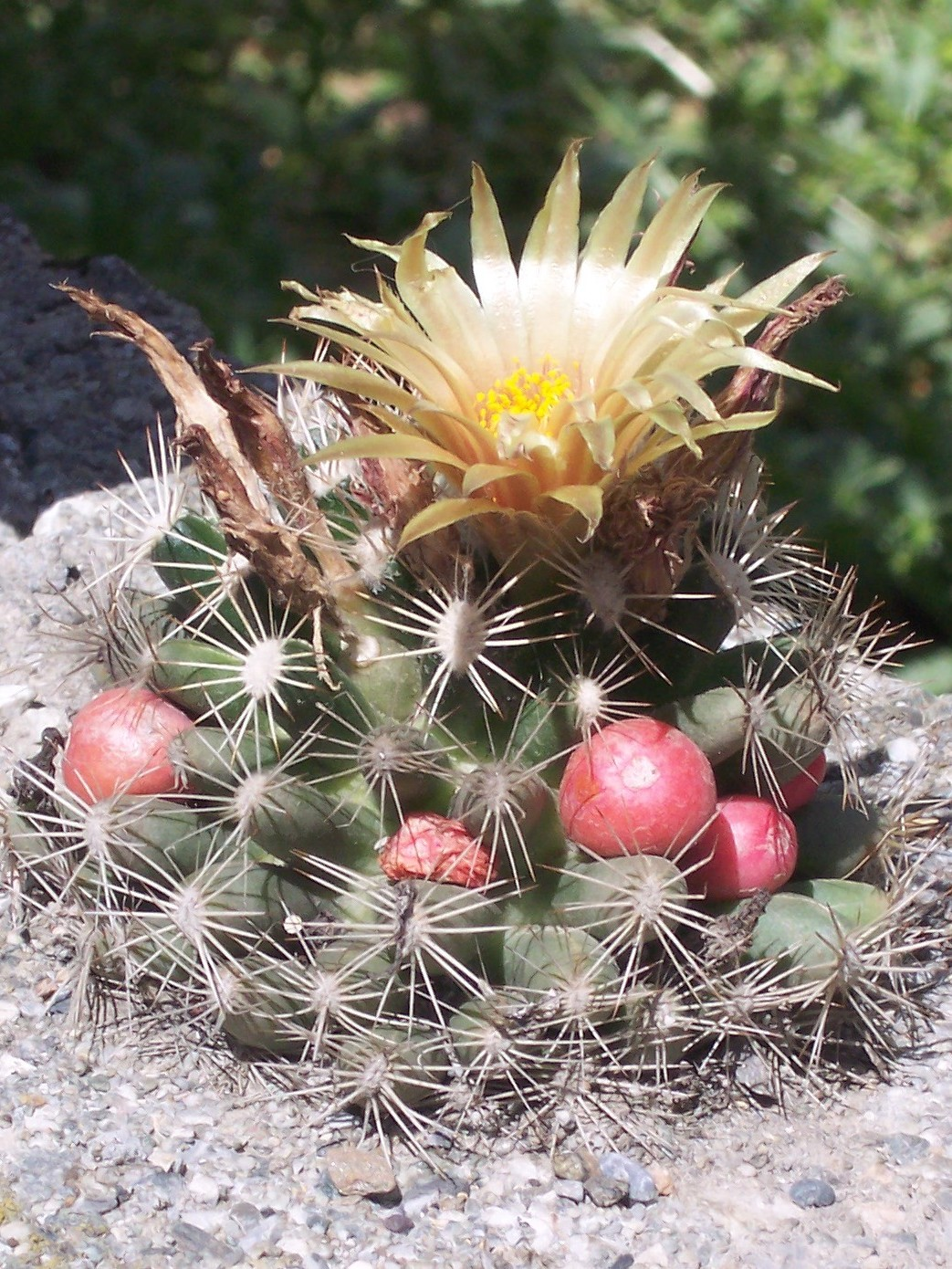
Missouri foxtail cactus, Coryphantha missouriensis

Family: Cactaceae

- Coryphantha missouriensis, Missouri foxtail cactus
- Coryphantha vivipara, spinystar cactus
- Opuntia fragilis, brittle pricklypear
- Opuntia polyacantha, Plains pricklypear
- Pediocactus simpsonii, Simpson's hedgehog cactus

== Carpetweed ==
Family: Molluginaceae

- Mollugo verticillata, green carpetweed

== Four-o-clock ==
Family: Nyctaginaceae

- Abronia fragrans, fragrant white sand-verbena
- Mirabilis albida, white four-o'clock
- Mirabilis linearis, narrow-leaf four-o'clock
- Mirabilis nyctaginea, heartleaf four-o'clock
- Tripterocalyx micranthus, small-flower sand-verbena

== Greasewood ==
Family: Sarcobataceae

- Sarcobatus vermiculatus, black greasewood

== Pinks ==
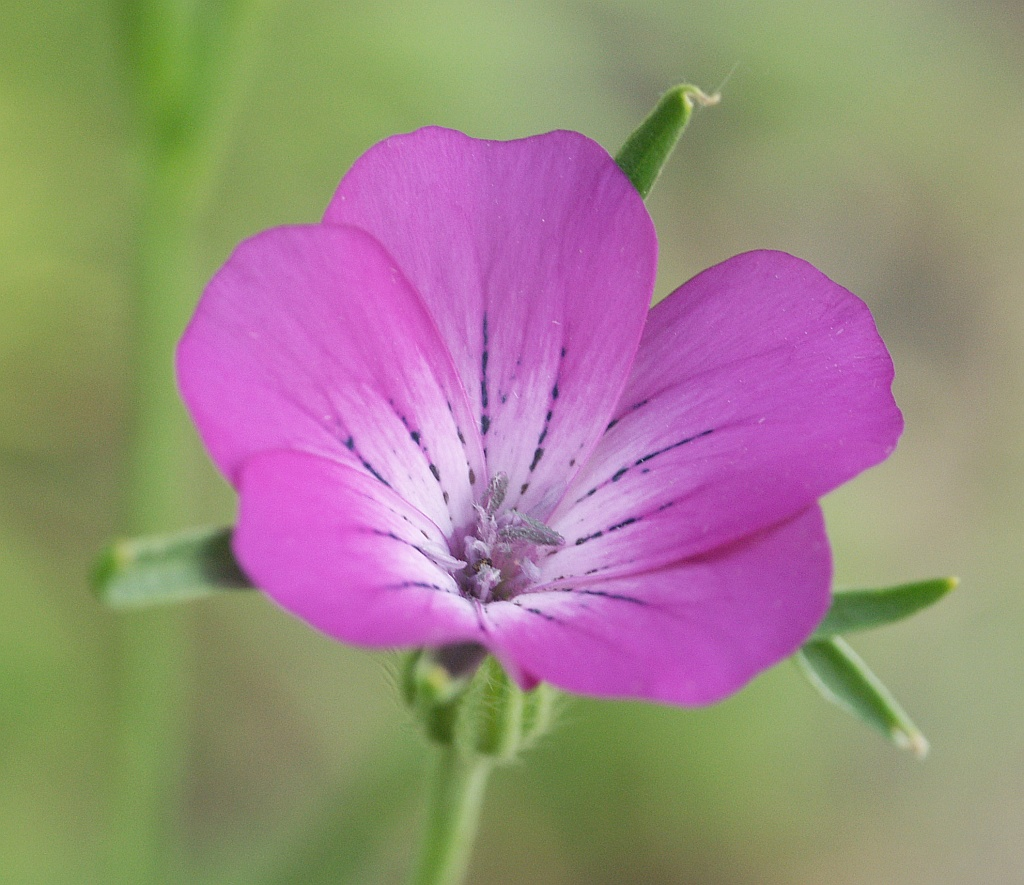
Common corncockle

Family: Caryophyllaceae

- Agrostemma githago, common corncockle
- Arenaria aculeata, spiny sandwort
- Arenaria capillaris, fescue sandwort
- Arenaria congesta, capitate sandwort
- Arenaria congesta var. cephaloidea, sharptip sandwort
- Arenaria congesta var. congesta, ballhead sandwort
- Arenaria congesta var. lithophila, rock-loving sandwort
- Arenaria hookeri, Hooker's sandwort
- Arenaria kingii, King's arenaria
- Arenaria serpyllifolia, thymeleaf sandwort
- Cerastium arvense, field chickweed
- Cerastium beeringianum, bering sea chickweed
- Cerastium brachypodum, shortstalk chickweed
- Cerastium fontanum, common mouse-ear chickweed
- Cerastium glomeratum, sticky mouse-ear chickweed
- Cerastium nutans, nodding chickweed
- Cerastium tomentosum, snow-in-summer
- Dianthus armeria, Deptford pink
- Dianthus barbatus, sweet-william
- Dianthus deltoides, maiden-pink
- Gypsophila paniculata, tall baby's-breath
- Gypsophila scorzonerifolia, garden baby's-breath
- Holosteum umbellatum, jagged chickweed
- Minuartia austromontana, Columbian stitchwort
- Minuartia nuttallii, Nuttall's sandwort
- Minuartia obtusiloba, alpine stitchwort
- Minuartia rubella, boreal stitchwort
- Moehringia lateriflora, grove sandwort
- Moehringia macrophylla, largeleaf sandwort
- Myosoton aquaticum, giant-chickweed
- Paronychia sessiliflora, low nailwort
- Sagina nivalis, arctic pearlwort
- Sagina procumbens, procumbent pearlwort
- Sagina saginoides, arctic pearlwort
- Saponaria officinalis, bouncing-bet
- Scleranthus annuus, annual knawel
- Silene acaulis, moss campion
- Silene antirrhina, sleepy catchfly
- Silene conoidea, conoid catchfly
- Silene csereii, Balkan catchfly
- Silene dichotoma, forked catchfly
- Silene dioica, red catchfly
- Silene douglasii, Douglas' campion
- Silene drummondii, Drummond's campion
- Silene flos-cuculi, ragged robin
- Silene hitchguirei, mountain campion
- Silene latifolia, bladder campion
- Silene menziesii, Menzies' pink
- Silene noctiflora, night-flowering catchfly
- Silene oregana, Oregon catchfly
- Silene parryi, Parry's campion
- Silene repens, creeping catchfly
- Silene scouleri, Scouler's catchfly
- Silene spaldingii, Spalding's catchfly
- Silene uralensis, apetalous catchfly
- Silene vulgaris, maiden's-tears
- Spergula arvensis, cornspurry
- Spergularia media, middle-size sandspurry
- Spergularia rubra, purple sandspurry
- Spergularia salina, saltmarsh sandspurry
- Stellaria americana, American stitchwort
- Stellaria borealis, northern stitchwort
- Stellaria calycantha, northern stitchwort
- Stellaria crassifolia, fleshy stitchwort
- Stellaria crispa, crimped stitchwort
- Stellaria graminea, little starwort
- Stellaria jamesiana, James stitchwort
- Stellaria longifolia, longleaf stitchwort
- Stellaria longipes, long-stalked stitchwort
- Stellaria media, common starwort
- Stellaria nitens, shiny stitchwort
- Stellaria obtusa, Rocky Mountain stitchwort
- Stellaria umbellata, umbellate stitchwort
- Vaccaria hispanica, cowcockle

== Purslane ==
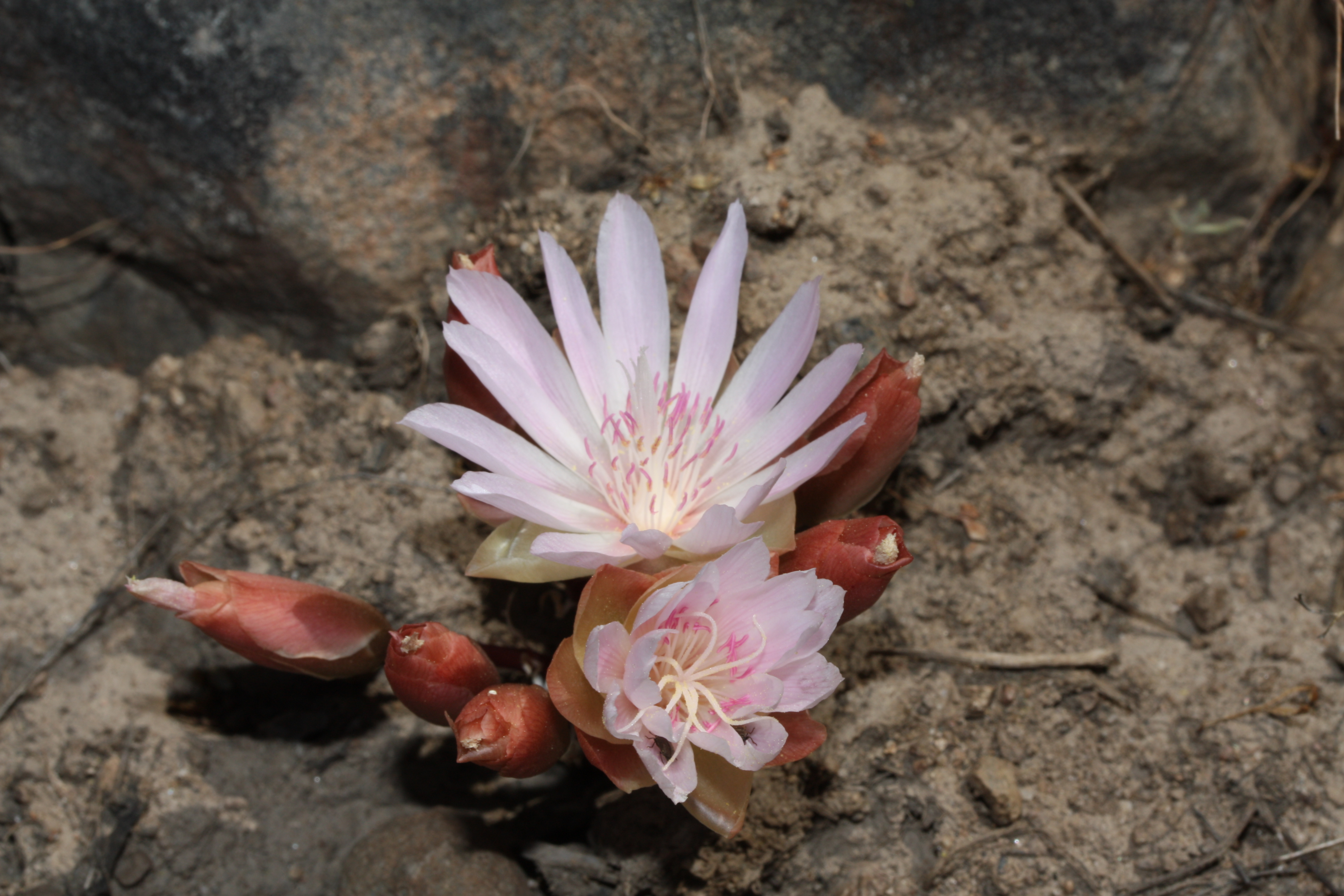
Bitterroot-Montana State Flower

Family: Portulacaceae

- Cistanthe umbellata, Mt. Hood pussy-paws
- Claytonia arenicola, sand springbeauty
- Claytonia cordifolia, heart-leaf springbeauty
- Claytonia lanceolata, springbeauty
- Claytonia megarhiza, alpine springbeauty
- Claytonia multiscapa, Rydberg's springbeauty
- Claytonia parviflora, little-flower springbeauty
- Claytonia perfoliata, miner's-lettuce
- Claytonia sibirica, Siberian springbeauty
- Lewisia columbiana, Columbia lewisia
- Lewisia pygmaea, alpine bitterroot
- Lewisia rediviva, bitterroot
- Lewisia triphylla, three-leaf bitterroot
- Montia chamissoi, Chamisso's miner's-lettuce
- Montia dichotoma, dwarf miner's-lettuce
- Montia linearis, linearleaf miner's-lettuce
- Montia parvifolia, little-leaf miner's-lettuce
- Portulaca oleracea, common purslane
- Talinum calycinum, large-flower flameflower

== See also ==
- List of dicotyledons of Montana
