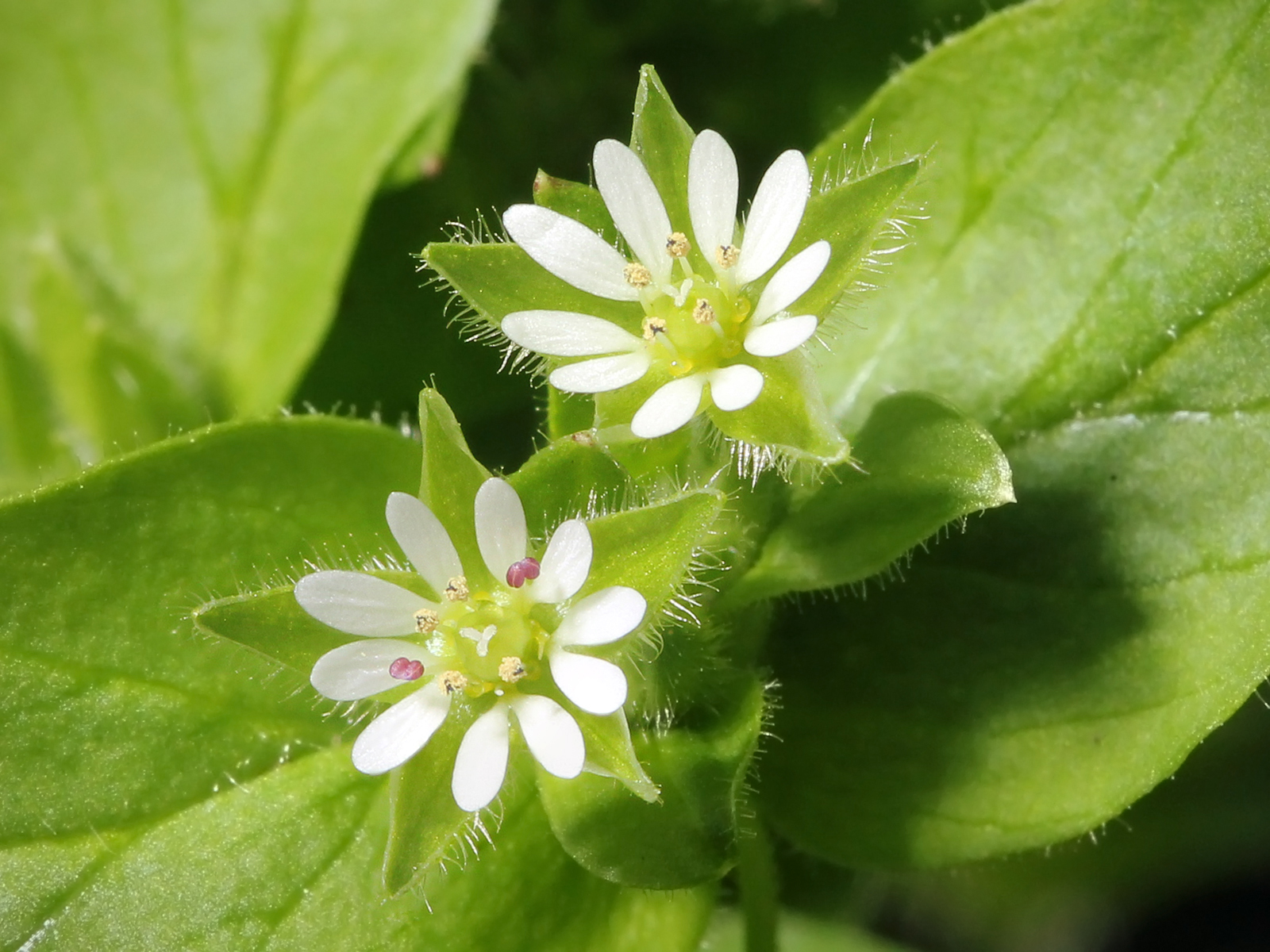
- Common chickweed (Stellaria media)

Scientific classification
- Kingdom: Plantae
- Clade: Embryophytes
- Clade: Tracheophytes
- Clade: Angiosperms
- Clade: Eudicots
- Order: Caryophyllales
- Family: Caryophyllaceae
- Genus: Stellaria; L. (1753), nom. cons.

Synonyms
- List: Alsine Tourn. ex L.; Alsinula Dostál; Ballarion Raf.; Baretia Timaná; Bigelowia Raf.; Fimbripetalum (Turcz.) Ikonn.; Hylebia Fourr.; Larbrea A.St.-Hil.; Leucostemma Benth. ex G.Don; Malachia Fr.; Micropetalon Pers.; Myosanthus Desv.; Myosoton Moench; Plettkea Mattf.; Pycnophyllopsis Skottsb.; Spergulastrum Michx.; Stellularia Hill; Tytthostemma Nevski

= Stellaria =

Genus of flowering plants in the carnation family

Stellaria is a genus of about 190 species of flowering plants in the family Caryophyllaceae, with a cosmopolitan distribution. Common names include starwort, stitchwort and chickweed.

== Description ==
Stellaria species are relatively small herbs with simple opposite leaves. It produces small flowers with 5 sepals and 5 white petals each usually deeply cleft, or none at all, all free. Stamens 10 or fewer.

=== Uses ===
Some species, including Stellaria media which is widely distributed throughout the Northern Hemisphere, are used as leaf vegetables, often raw in salads. This is a favored food of finches and many other seed-eating birds.

Chickweeds are used as food plants by the larvae of some Lepidoptera species including angle shades, heart and dart, riband wave, setaceous Hebrew character and the Coleophora case-bearers C. coenosipennella (feeds exclusively on Stellaria species), C. lineolea (recorded on S. graminea), C. lithargyrinella (recorded on S. holostea), C. solitariella (feeds exclusively on S. holostea) and C. striatipennella.

Several closely related plants referred to as chickweed, but which lack the culinary properties of plants in the genus Stellaria, include members of the genus Cerastium, of similar appearance to Stellaria and also in the (Caryophyllaceae).

== Species ==
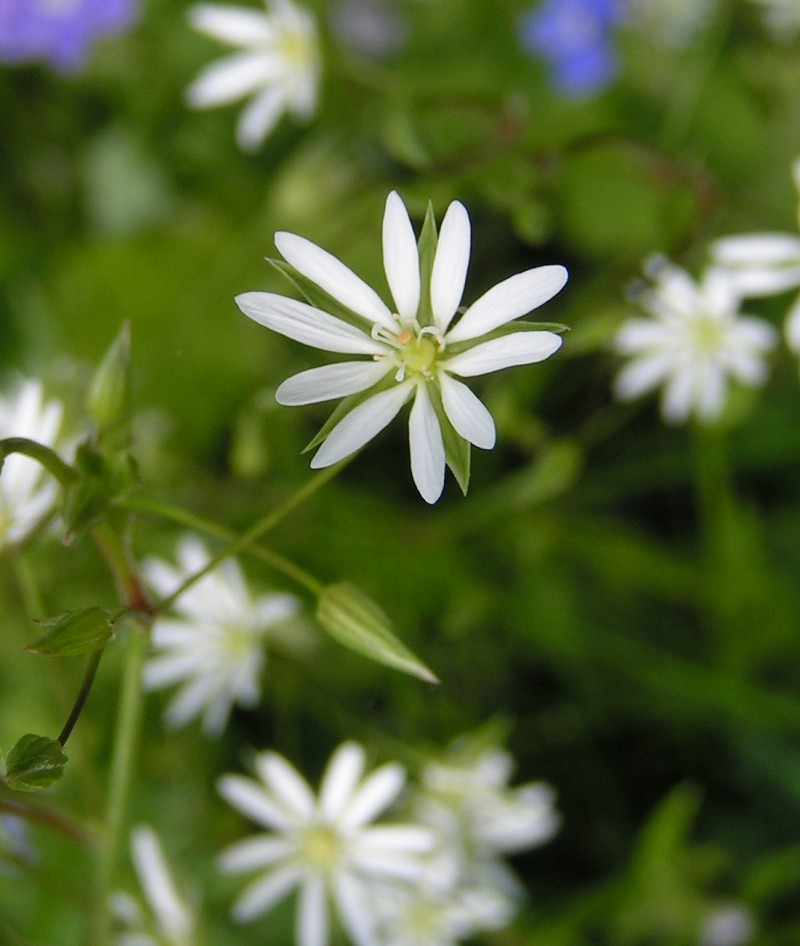
Lesser stitchwort, Stellaria graminea

The following species are recognised in the genus Stellaria:

- Stellaria abadensis H.F.Xu & Z.H.Ma
- Stellaria × adulterina Focke
- Stellaria alaschanica Y.Z.Zhao
- Stellaria alaskana Hultén
- Stellaria alpamarcae (A.Gray) Montesin. & Borsch
- Stellaria × alpestris (Hartm.) Hartm.
- Stellaria alsine Grimm – bog stitchwort
- Stellaria alsinoides Boiss. & Buhse
- Stellaria altimontana N.S.Pavlova
- Stellaria × ambigua Bég.
- Stellaria amblyosepala Schrenk
- Stellaria amplexicaulis (Hand.-Mazz.) Huan C.Wang & Feng Yang
- Stellaria anagalloides Rupr.
- Stellaria andina (Rohrb.) Montesin. & Borsch
- Stellaria angarae Popov
- Stellaria angustifolia Hook.
- Stellaria antillana Urb.
- Stellaria apetala Ucria
- Stellaria aphanantha Griseb.
- Stellaria aphananthoidea Muschl.
- Stellaria apurimacensis Montesin. & D.Cornejo
- Stellaria aquatica (L.) Scop. – water chickweed
- Stellaria arenarioides Shi L.Chen, Rabeler & Turland
- Stellaria arvalis Fenzl ex F.Phil.
- Stellaria assadii Mahdavi
- Stellaria australis Zoll. & Moritzi
- Stellaria bayanensis L.Q.Zhao & Y.Z.Zhao
- Stellaria bengalensis Sindhu Arya & Harsh Singh
- Stellaria borealis Bigelow
- Stellaria brachypetala Bunge
- Stellaria bungeana Fenzl
- Stellaria calycantha (Ledeb.) Bong.
- Stellaria celsa Ravenna
- Stellaria chilensis Pedersen
- Stellaria chinensis Regel
- Stellaria circinata Ravenna
- Stellaria concinna Ravenna
- Stellaria congesta Montesin. & Borsch
- Stellaria congestiflora H.Hara
- Stellaria corei Shinners
- Stellaria crassifolia Ehrh.
- Stellaria crispa Cham. & Schltdl.
- Stellaria cryptantha (Mattf.) M.T.Sharples & E.A.Tripp
- Stellaria cryptopetala Griseb.
- Stellaria cuonaensis L.H.Zhou
- Stellaria cupaniana (Jord. & Fourr.) Bég.
- Stellaria cuspidata Willd. ex D.F.K.Schltdl.
- Stellaria darvasievii Kamelin
- Stellaria davurica D.F.K.Schltdl.
- Stellaria debilis d'Urv.
- Stellaria decipiens Hook.f.
- Stellaria decumbens Edgew.
- Stellaria depauperata Edgew.
- Stellaria depressa Em.Schmid
- Stellaria dianthifolia F.N.Williams
- Stellaria dicranoides (Cham. & Schltdl.) Fenzl
- Stellaria discolor Turcz.
- Stellaria edwardsii R.Br.
- Stellaria emirnensis Danguy
- Stellaria engleriana (Muschl.) Montesin. & Borsch
- Stellaria erecta Charit.
- Stellaria erlangeriana Engl.
- Stellaria eschscholtziana Fenzl
- Stellaria fennica (Murb.) Perfil.
- Stellaria fenzlii Regel
- Stellaria filicaulis Makino
- Stellaria filiformis (Benth.) Mattf.
- Stellaria fischeriana Ser.
- Stellaria flaccida Hook. – forest starwort
- Stellaria galianoi Montesin. & Borsch
- Stellaria × glauciformis Bouvet
- Stellaria gracilenta Hook.f.
- Stellaria graminea L. – lesser stitchwort
- Stellaria gyangtseensis F.N.Williams
- Stellaria gyirongensis L.H.Zhou
- Stellaria hebecalyx Fenzl
- Stellaria henryi F.N.Williams
- Stellaria hibinoi Seriz.
- Stellaria hintoniorum B.L.Turner
- Stellaria humifusa Rottb. – saltmarsh starwort
- Stellaria × hybrida Rouy & Foucaud
- Stellaria imbricata Bunge
- Stellaria infracta Maxim.
- Stellaria inundata Vorosch.
- Stellaria irazuensis Donn.Sm.
- Stellaria irrigua Bunge
- Stellaria jacutica Schischk.
- Stellaria keraiopetala (Mattf.) Montesin. & Borsch
- Stellaria koelzii Rech.f.
- Stellaria kolymensis A.P.Khokhr.
- Stellaria krylovii N.V.Vlassova & Artemov
- Stellaria laeta Richardson
- Stellaria laevis (Bartl.) Rohrb.
- Stellaria lanata Hook.f.
- Stellaria × lancifolia Kom.
- Stellaria lanipes C.Y.Wu & H.Chuang
- Stellaria laxmannii Fisch. ex Ser.
- Stellaria leptoclada (Benth.) C.H.Mill. & J.G.West
- Stellaria littoralis Torr.
- Stellaria longifolia Muhl. ex Willd.
- Stellaria longipedicellata W.Qiao Wang & Z.H.Ma
- Stellaria longipes Goldie – long-stalk starwort
- Stellaria macbridei Montesin. & Borsch
- Stellaria macrophylla (Muschl.) Montesin. & Borsch
- Stellaria mainlingensis L.H.Zhou
- Stellaria mannii Hook.f.
- Stellaria mcclintockiae V.S.A.Kumar, Sindhu Arya, V.Suresh, Sojan & Alen Alex
- Stellaria media (L.) Vill. – common chickweed
- Stellaria merzbacheri Kozhevn.
- Stellaria miahuatlana B.L.Turner
- Stellaria minuta Kirk
- Stellaria montioides (Edgew. & Hook.f.) Ghaz.
- Stellaria multiflora Hook.
- Stellaria multipartita Bo Xu & Meng Li
- Stellaria neglecta (Lej.) Weihe – greater chickweed
- Stellaria nemorum L. – wood stitchwort
- Stellaria neotomentosa M.Mizush. ex H.Ohba
- Stellaria nepalensis Majumdar & Vartak
- Stellaria nipponica Ohwi
- Stellaria nitens Nutt.
- Stellaria nubigena Standl.
- Stellaria omeiensis C.Y.Wu & Tsui ex P.Ke
- Stellaria ovata Willd. ex D.F.K.Schltdl.
- Stellaria ovatifolia Willd. ex D.F.K.Schltdl.
- Stellaria oxycoccoides Kom.
- Stellaria palustris Ehrh. ex Hoffm. – marsh stitchwort
- Stellaria papillata C.H.Mill. & J.G.West
- Stellaria parviflora Banks & Sol. ex Hook.f.
- Stellaria parviumbellata Y.Z.Zhao
- Stellaria patagonica Montesin. & Borsch
- Stellaria patens D.Don
- Stellaria pauciflora Zoll. & Moritzi
- Stellaria pedersenii Volponi
- Stellaria peduncularis Bunge
- Stellaria pedunculosa (Wedd.) Montesin. & Borsch
- Stellaria pentastyla W.Qiao Wang, H.F.Xu & Z.H.Ma
- Stellaria persica Boiss.
- Stellaria petiolaris Hand.-Mazz.
- Stellaria pilosoides Shi L.Chen, Rabeler & Turland
- Stellaria pinvalliaca Chandra Sek. & S.K.Srivast.
- Stellaria polyantha (Edgew. & Hook.f.) M.T.Sharples & E.A.Tripp
- Stellaria porsildii C.C.Chinnappa
- Stellaria procumbens Huan C.Wang & Feng Yang
- Stellaria pterosperma Ohwi
- Stellaria pubera Michx. – star chickweed
- Stellaria pulvinata Grubov
- Stellaria pungens Brongn. – prickly starwort
- Stellaria pusilla Em.Schmid
- Stellaria radians L.
- Stellaria rajbhandaryi Kafle & G.Parmar
- Stellaria recurvata Willd. ex D.F.K.Schltdl.
- Stellaria reticulivena Hayata
- Stellaria rigida Bunge
- Stellaria roughii Hook.f.
- Stellaria ruderalis M.Lepší, P.Lepší, Z.Kaplan & P.Koutecký
- Stellaria ruscifolia D.F.K.Schltdl.
- Stellaria salicifolia Tsui & P.Ke
- Stellaria sanjuanensis M.T.Sharples & E.A.Tripp
- Stellaria sarcophylla Rech.f.
- Stellaria schischkinii Peschkova
- Stellaria semivestita Edgew.
- Stellaria sennii Chiov.
- Stellaria serpens Ravenna
- Stellaria sessiliflora Y.Yabe
- Stellaria sibirica (Regel & Tiling) Schischk.
- Stellaria sikaramensis Rech.f.
- Stellaria sikkimensis Hook.f.
- Stellaria sitchana Steud.
- Stellaria smithii (Timaná) Montesin. & Borsch
- Stellaria soongorica Roshev.
- Stellaria souliei F.N.Williams
- Stellaria spinulosa Montesin. & Borsch
- Stellaria standleyi (Baehni & J.F.Macbr.) Montesin. & Borsch
- Stellaria strongylosepala Hand.-Mazz.
- Stellaria taiwanensis S.S.Ying
- Stellaria tetrasticha (Mattf.) M.T.Sharples & E.A.Tripp
- Stellaria tibetica Kurz
- Stellaria uchiyamana Makino
- Stellaria uda F.N.Williams
- Stellaria undulata Thunb.
- Stellaria utcubambensis Montesin. & Borsch
- Stellaria venezuelana Steyerm.
- Stellaria vestita Kurz
- Stellaria villasenorii Montesin. & Borsch
- Stellaria viridifolia A.P.Khokhr.) A.P.Khokhr.
- Stellaria wallichiana Haines
- Stellaria weberbaueri (Muschl.) Montesin. & Borsch
- Stellaria weddellii Pedersen
- Stellaria williamsiana Kozhevn.
- Stellaria winkleri (Briq.) Schischk.
- Stellaria xanthophylla Montesin. & Borsch
- Stellaria yinshanensis L.Q.Zhao & Y.Z.Zhao
- Stellaria yungasensis (Rusby) Rusby ex Volponi
- Stellaria yunnanensis Franch.
- Stellaria zangnanensis L.H.Zhou
- Stellaria zhuxiensis Q.L.Gan & X.W.Li

=== Formerly placed here ===
- Engellaria obtusa (Engelm.) Iamonico (as Stellaria obtusa Engelm.)
- Hesperostellaria americana (Porter ex B.L.Rob.) Gang Yao, B.Xue & Z.Q.Song (as Stellaria americana (Porter ex B.L.Rob.) Standl.)
- Reniostellaria bistylata (W.Z.Di & Y.Ren) Gang Yao, B.Xue & Z.Q.Song (as Stellar bistylata W.Z.Di & Y.Ren)
- Schizotechium turkestanicum (Schischk.) Arabi, Rabeler & Zarre (as Stellaria turkestanica Schischk.)
- Torreyostellaria jamesiana (Torr.) Gang Yao, B.Xue & Z.Q.Song (as Stellaria jamesiana Torr.)
- Rabelera holostea M.T.Sharples & E.A.Tripp (as Stellaria holostea L.) – greater stitchwort, greater starwort, or addersmeat
