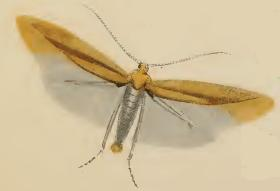

Scientific classification
- Kingdom: Animalia
- Phylum: Arthropoda
- Class: Insecta
- Order: Lepidoptera
- Family: Coleophoridae
- Genus: Coleophora
- Species: C. solitariella

Binomial name
- Coleophora solitariella Zeller, 1849

= Coleophora solitariella =

Species of moth

Coleophora solitariella is a moth of the family Coleophoridae. It is found from Fennoscandia to the Pyrenees, Italy and Romania and from Great Britain to southern Russia.

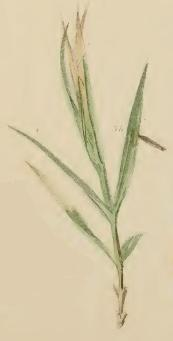
Sprig of Stellaria holostea with mined leaves

Larva

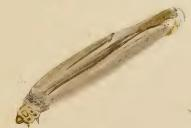
Larval case

The wingspan is 10–13 mm.

The larvae feed on Arenaria serpyllifolia, Cerastium arvense, Cerastium glomeratum, Myosoton aquaticum, Stellaria alsine, Stellaria holostea, Stellaria media, Stellaria nemorum and Stellaria uliginosa. Full-grown cases can be found in May.
