= Water chickweed =

Water chickweed is a common name for several plants and may refer to:

- Montia fontana
- Stellaria aquatica
