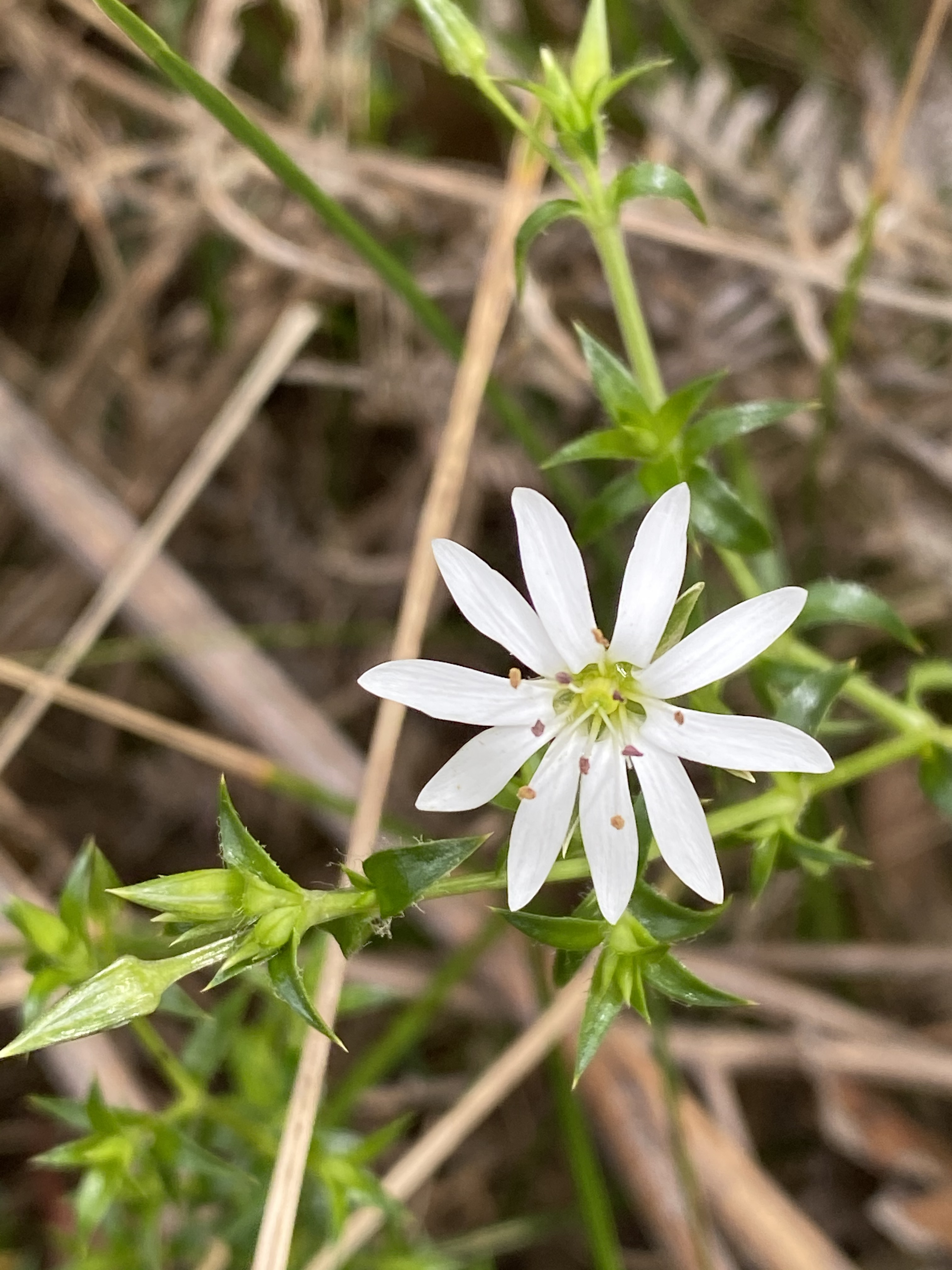

Scientific classification
- Kingdom: Plantae
- Clade: Tracheophytes
- Clade: Angiosperms
- Clade: Eudicots
- Order: Caryophyllales
- Family: Caryophyllaceae
- Genus: Stellaria
- Species: S. pungens

Binomial name
- Stellaria pungens Brongn.

= Stellaria pungens =

Prickly starwort

Species of plant

Stellaria pungens, commonly known as prickly starwort, is a flowering plant in the family Caryophyllaceae and is endemic to eastern Australia. It is a small, mat forming perennial with white star-shaped flowers and small sharply pointed, bright green leaves.

== Description ==
Stellaria pungens is a sprawling or prostrate, mat forming perennial forb with angular stems that may be smooth or with occasional hairs. The leaves are arranged opposite, bright green, 5–10 mm (0.20–0.39 in) long, about 2 mm (0.079 in) wide at the base, sessile, narrowly egg-shaped, somewhat stiff, slightly curved upward, hairy edges and ending in a sharp point. The star-shaped flowers have five deeply divided petals giving the appearance of ten petals, each petal to 9 mm (0.35 in) long and ten prominent dark anthers. The flowers are borne singly at the end of the stems or in the upper leaf axils on a pedicel 5–30 mm (0.20–1.18 in) long. The sepals are more less as long as the petals, pointed, edges dry, thin and flexible. The fruit is a dry, egg-shaped capsule up to 8 mm (0.31 in) long. Flowering occurs from October to December.

== Taxonomy ==
Stellaria pungens was first formally described in 1834 by Adolphe-Théodore Brongniart and the description was published in Voyage Autour du Monde. Botanique.

== Distribution and habitat ==
Prickly starwort is a moderately common species growing in steep, rocky or shaded sites in woodland in New South Wales, Victoria, Tasmania and South Australia.
