= Stellaria cupaniana =

Scientific classification
- Kingdom: Plantae
- Clade: Tracheophytes
- Clade: Angiosperms
- Clade: Eudicots
- Order: Caryophyllales
- Family: Caryophyllaceae
- Genus: Stellaria
- Species: S. cupaniana

Binomial name
- Stellaria cupaniana (Jordan & Fourr.) Beguinot

Synonyms
- Stellaria media subsp. cupaniana

Species of plant

Stellaria cupaniana is a species of plants in the family Caryophyllaceae (carpetweeds).

== Sources ==
This article incorporates text from a free content work. Licensed under CC0 (license statement/permission). Text taken from Stellaria cupaniana. Encyclopedia of Life.
