= Stellaria recurvata =

Conservation status
- Least Concern (IUCN 3.1)

Scientific classification
- Kingdom: Plantae
- Clade: Tracheophytes
- Clade: Angiosperms
- Clade: Eudicots
- Order: Caryophyllales
- Family: Caryophyllaceae
- Genus: Stellaria
- Species: S. recurvata

Binomial name
- Stellaria recurvata Willd. ex Schltdl.

Species of flowering plant

Stellaria recurvata is a species of plant in the family Caryophyllaceae. It is endemic to Ecuador. Its natural habitat is subtropical or tropical high-altitude grassland.
