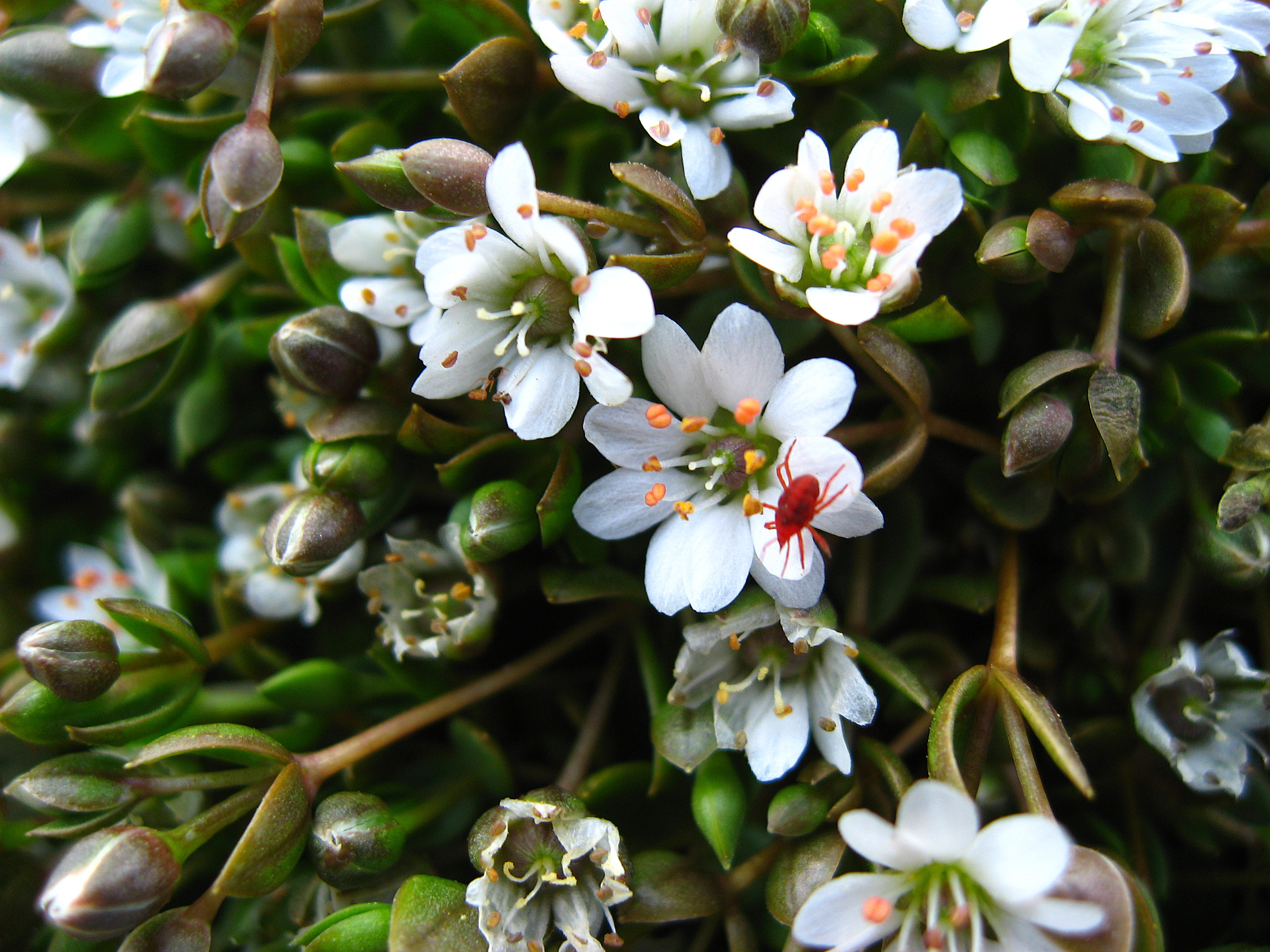
- Saltmarsh starwort, Stellaria humifusa in Kangersuatsiaq, Greenland

Scientific classification
- Kingdom: Plantae
- Clade: Tracheophytes
- Clade: Angiosperms
- Clade: Eudicots
- Order: Caryophyllales
- Family: Caryophyllaceae
- Genus: Stellaria
- Species: S. humifusa

Binomial name
- Stellaria humifusa Rottb.

= Stellaria humifusa =

Saltmarsh starwort

Species of flowering plant

Stellaria humifusa, the saltmarsh starwort, is plant native to northern North America and Eurasia.
