= Stellaria porsildii =

Conservation status
- Critically Imperiled (NatureServe)

Scientific classification
- Kingdom: Plantae
- Clade: Tracheophytes
- Clade: Angiosperms
- Clade: Eudicots
- Order: Caryophyllales
- Family: Caryophyllaceae
- Genus: Stellaria
- Species: S. porsildii

Binomial name
- Stellaria porsildii Chinnappa

Species of flowering plant

Stellaria porsildii is a rare species of flowering plant in the family Caryophyllaceae known by the common name Porsild's starwort. It is native to Arizona, where it can be found in the Chiricahua Mountains, and New Mexico, where it is known from one mountain.

This perennial herb produces an erect, four-sided stem up to about 20 centimeters long from a rhizome. The green, non-waxy leaves are linear to lance-shaped and roughly 3 centimeters long. The flowers, each about a centimeter wide, have five white petals and ten stamens. The fruit is a black capsule containing tiny seeds.

The plant occurs in openings and on the edges of forests of oak, pine, poplar, and Douglas-fir.
