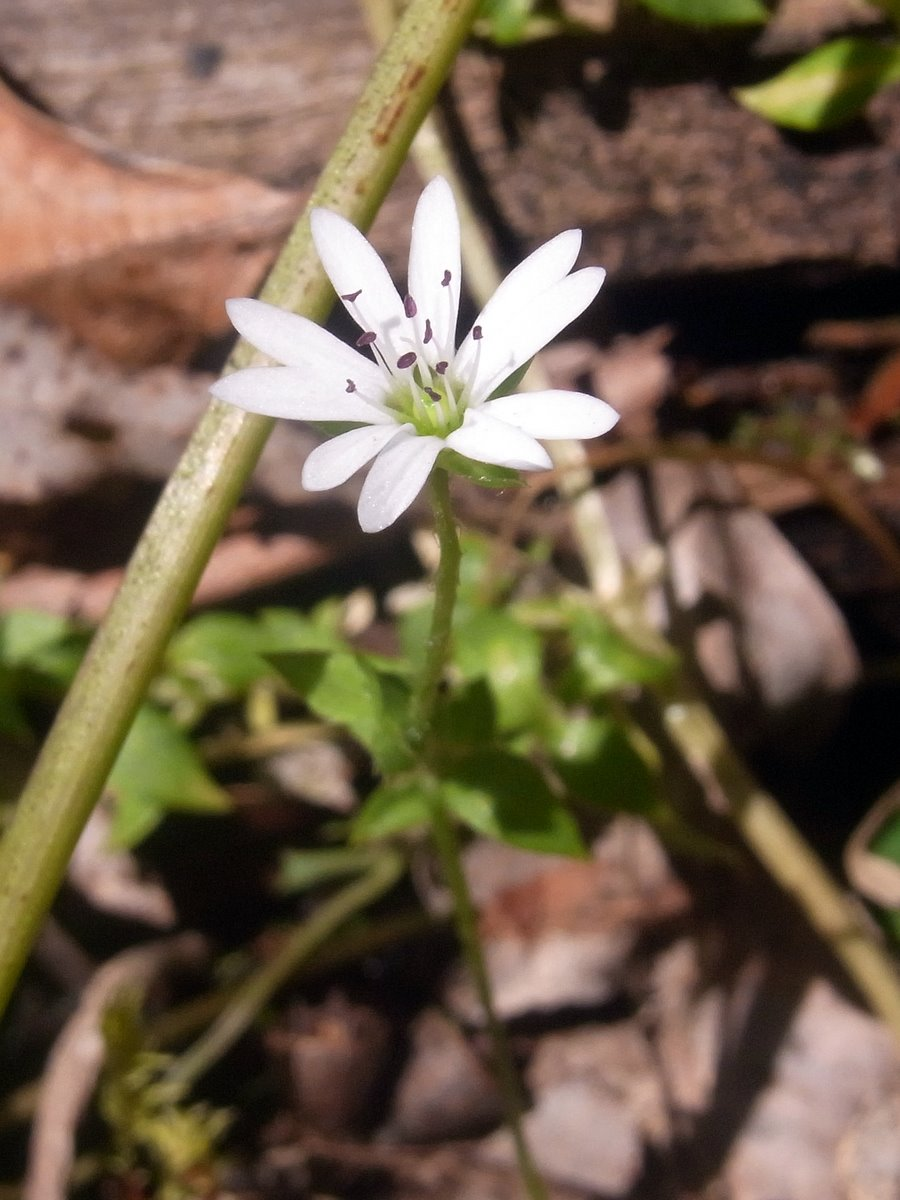
- Forest starwort at Black Bulga State Conservation Area, Australia

Scientific classification
- Kingdom: Plantae
- Clade: Tracheophytes
- Clade: Angiosperms
- Clade: Eudicots
- Order: Caryophyllales
- Family: Caryophyllaceae
- Genus: Stellaria
- Species: S. flaccida

Binomial name
- Stellaria flaccida Hook.

= Stellaria flaccida =

Forest starwort

Species of plant

Stellaria flaccida, the forest starwort, is a wildflower found in eastern and southern Australia. A small ground covering plant. It may grow to 50 cm tall, but usually seen shorter than this.

A perennial or annual, with weak stems. Sometimes it roots from the nodes. White hairs form on new growth. It features five petaled flowers, (each petal is split in two). Flowering occurs from September to February. Flowers are white with purple.

It is found on the coast and ranges, often in moist shady places in forest, or on the edge of rainforests. Leaves are lanceolate to ovate in shape, 7 to 18 mm long and 2 to 8 mm wide. The fruit is a small ovoid shaped capsule containing a small number of seeds.

The generic name Stellaria refers to the star like flowers, and the specific epithet flaccida refers to the weak and small form of the plant.
