= Stellaria villasenorii =

Scientific classification
- Kingdom: Plantae
- Clade: Tracheophytes
- Clade: Angiosperms
- Clade: Eudicots
- Order: Caryophyllales
- Family: Caryophyllaceae
- Genus: Stellaria
- Species: S. villasenorii

Binomial name
- Stellaria villasenorii Montesin. & Borsch (2023)

Synonyms
- Baretia lanata (Phil.) Timaná (2023); Pycnophyllopsis lanata (Phil.) Timaná ex J.Macaya, Novoa & Teillier (2017), not effectively publ.; Pycnophyllum lanatum Phil. (1892)

Genus of flowering plants

Stellaria villasenorii is a species of flowering plant in the carnation family, Caryophyllaceae. it is a subshrub endemic to Coquimbo Region of central Chile.
