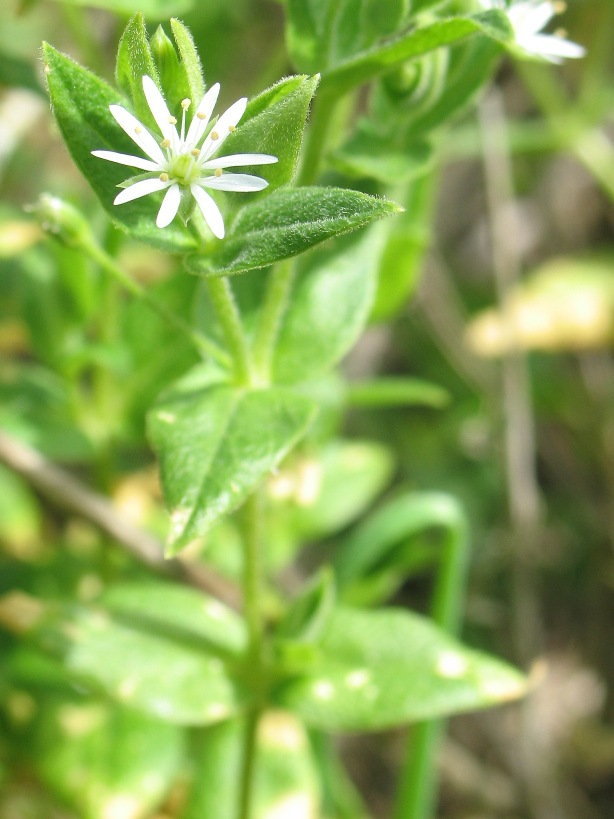

Scientific classification
- Kingdom: Plantae
- Clade: Tracheophytes
- Clade: Angiosperms
- Clade: Eudicots
- Order: Caryophyllales
- Family: Caryophyllaceae
- Genus: Stellaria
- Species: S. littoralis

Binomial name
- Stellaria littoralis Torr.

= Stellaria littoralis =

Species of flowering plant

Stellaria littoralis is a species of flowering plant in the family Caryophyllaceae known by the common name beach starwort. It is endemic to the San Francisco Bay Area and North Coast of California, where it grows in moist coast habitat, such as marshes, bogs, and coastal bluffs. It is a rhizomatous perennial herb producing sprawling, branching stems which are four-angled and hairy in texture, reaching up to about 60 centimeters long. The lance-shaped or pointed oval leaves are up to 4.5 centimeters long and are oppositely arranged in pairs. The inflorescence bears several flowers, each on a short pedicel. The flower has five hairy, pointed green sepals each a few millimeters long. There are five white petals, each so deeply lobed it appears to be two.

This plant is similar to its Asian relative Stellaria dichotoma, and it may actually be a population of that species that was introduced to the California coast long ago.
