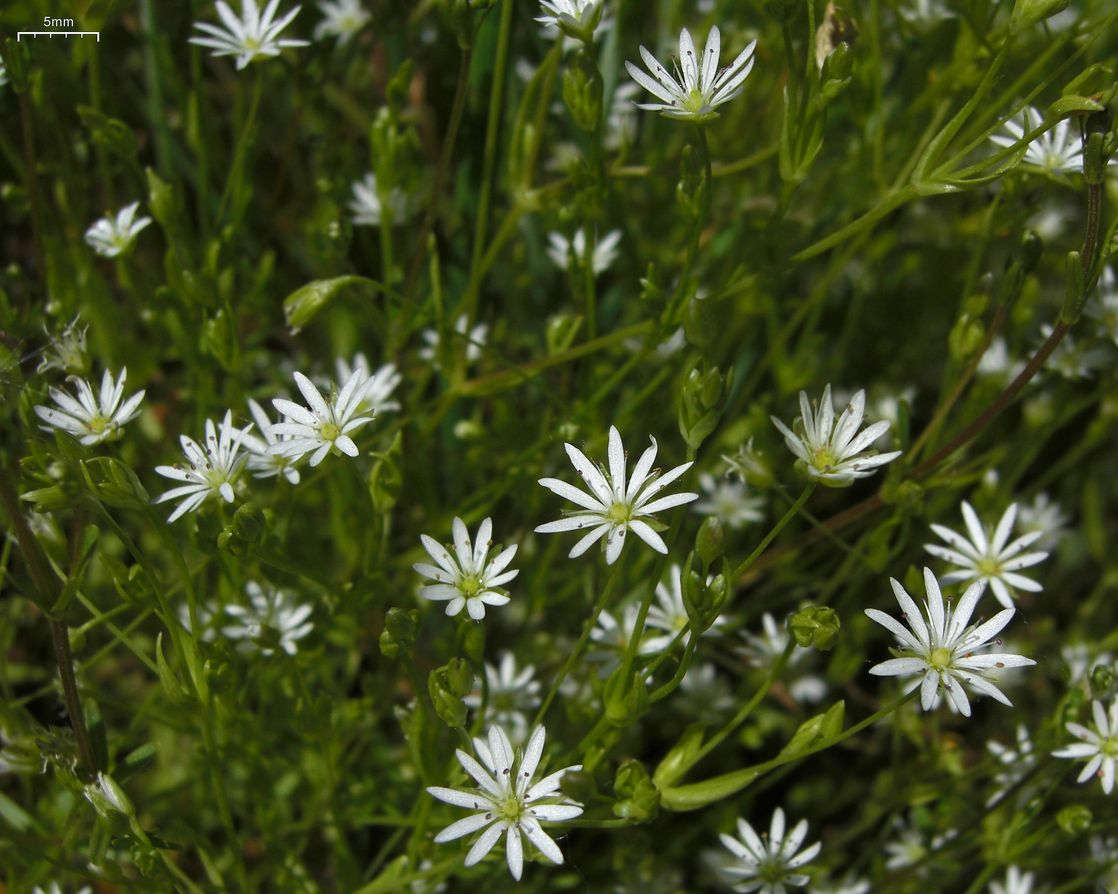

Conservation status
- Secure (NatureServe)

Scientific classification
- Kingdom: Plantae
- Clade: Tracheophytes
- Clade: Angiosperms
- Clade: Eudicots
- Order: Caryophyllales
- Family: Caryophyllaceae
- Genus: Stellaria
- Species: S. longifolia

Binomial name
- Stellaria longifolia Muhl. ex Willd.

= Stellaria longifolia =

Species of plant

Stellaria longifolia is a species of flowering plant in the family Caryophyllaceae known by the common name longleaf starwort. It is native to much of the northern half of the Northern Hemisphere, occurring throughout northern Europe and North America. It grows in many types of moist habitat, including meadows, marshes, and roadsides. It is a rhizomatous perennial herb forming clumps with sprawling, branching stems which are mostly hairless except for tiny rough hairs along the edges of the squarish stem. The linear to lance-shaped leaves are up to 3.5 centimeters long and are oppositely arranged in pairs. The inflorescence bears several flowers, each on a short pedicel. The flower has five pointed green sepals each a few millimeters long. There are five white petals, each so deeply lobed it appears to be two.
