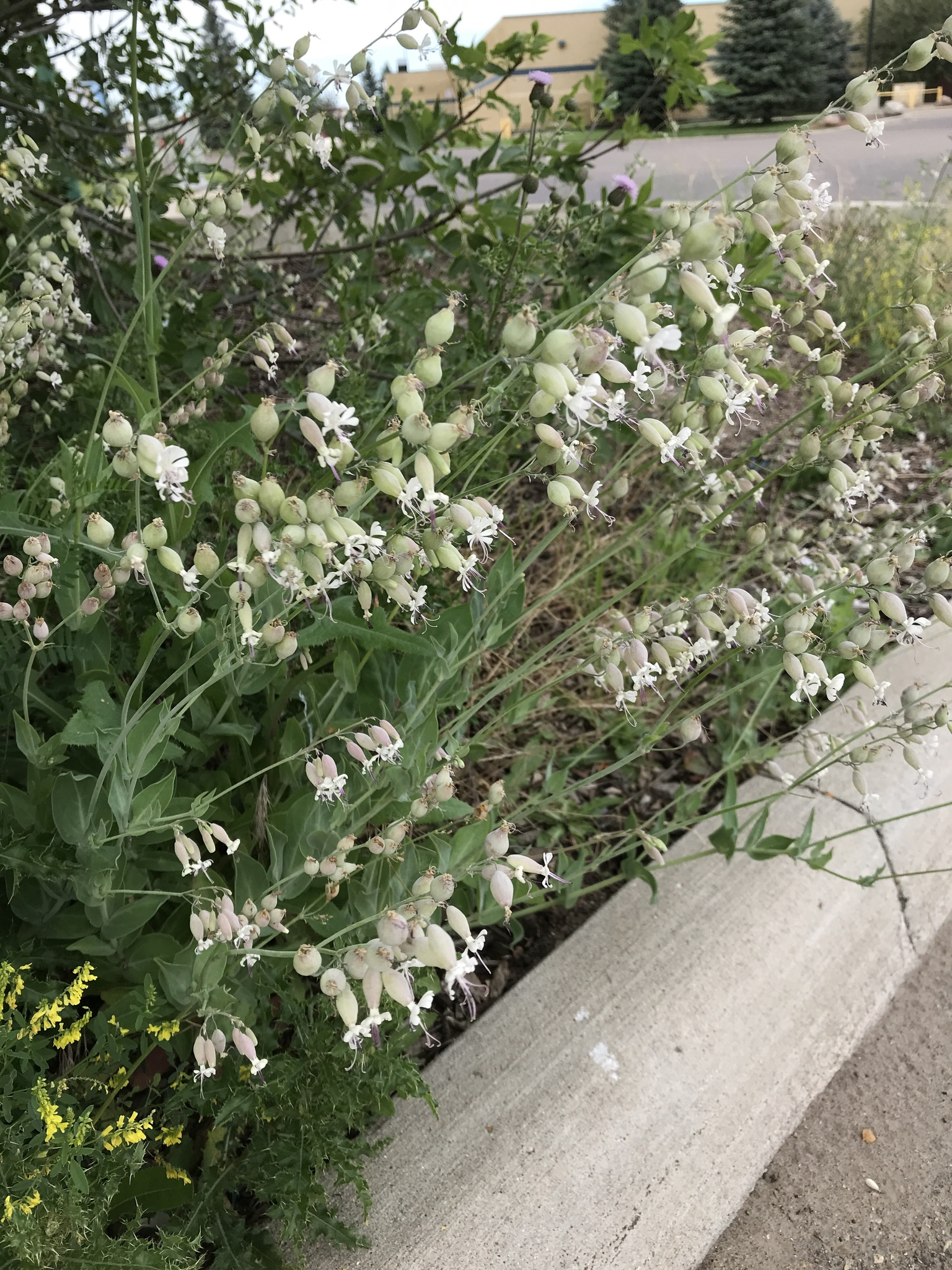
- The Balkan catchfly species of flowering plant

Scientific classification
- Kingdom: Plantae
- Clade: Tracheophytes
- Clade: Angiosperms
- Clade: Eudicots
- Order: Caryophyllales
- Family: Caryophyllaceae
- Genus: Silene
- Species: S. csereii

Binomial name
- Silene csereii Baumg.

Synonyms
- Behen csereii (Baumg.) Guşul.; Oberna aeoniopsis (Bornm.) Fedor.; Oberna anatolica (Melzh. & A.Baytop) Fedor.; Oberna caliacrae (Jordanov & Panov) Holub; Oberna csereii (Baumg.) Ikonn.; Oberna schottiana (Schur) Tzvelev; Silene aeoniopsis Bornm.; Silene alexeji Kolak.; Silene anatolica Melzh. & A.Baytop; Silene caliacrae Jordanov & Panov; Silene conringiifolia Andrz.; Silene csereii subsp. aeoniopsis (Bornm.) Chowdhuri; Silene csereii f. elatior (Guşul.) Váczy; Silene csereii f. pusilla (Săvul. & Rayss) Váczy; Silene csereii f. tenella (Guşul.) Váczy; Silene saponariifolia Schott ex Ledeb.; Silene schottiana Schur

= Silene csereii =

Species of flowering plant

Silene csereii, the Balkan catchfly, is a species of flowering plant found in countries surrounding the Black Sea and northern Caspian Sea. It is also widely introduced to central Europe, Scandinavia, Britain, southern Canada and the northern United States.

== Description ==
Silene csereii reaches 25–55 cm (10–22 in) tall. The leaves are opposite and entire. The inflorescence is 15–20 cm (6–8 in) long, comprising a number of bisexual flowers, each with a white corolla 4–5 mm (0.16–0.20 in) wide.
