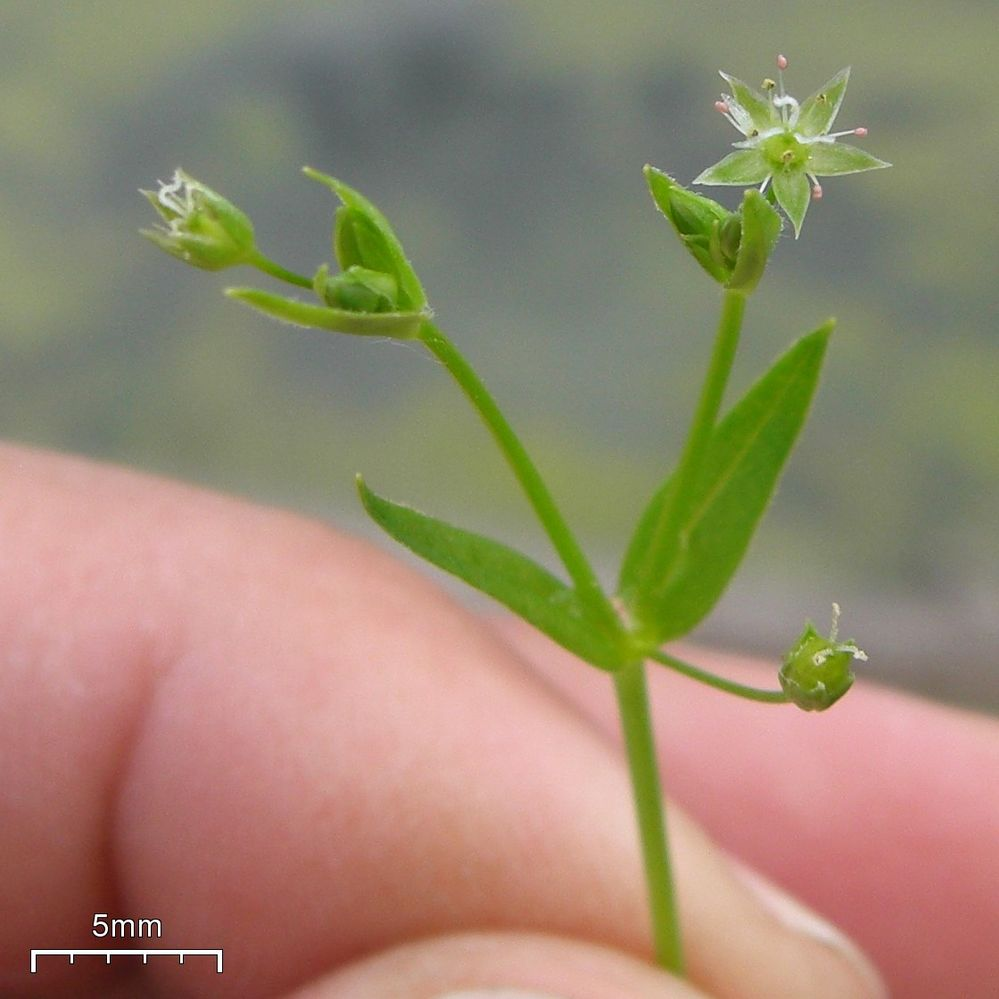

Conservation status
- Secure (NatureServe)

Scientific classification
- Kingdom: Plantae
- Clade: Tracheophytes
- Clade: Angiosperms
- Clade: Eudicots
- Order: Caryophyllales
- Family: Caryophyllaceae
- Genus: Stellaria
- Species: S. calycantha

Binomial name
- Stellaria calycantha (Ledeb.) Bong.

Synonyms
- Alsine calycantha Alsine simcoei Stellaria simcoei

= Stellaria calycantha =

Species of flowering plant in the carnation family

Stellaria calycantha is a species of flowering plant in the family Caryophyllaceae known by the common name northern starwort. It is native to western North America from Alaska and northwestern Canada to California and New Mexico, as well as eastern Russia. It occurs in subalpine and alpine climates, in many types of moist, shady habitats. It is a rhizomatous perennial herb producing a prostrate to erect stem up to 25 centimeters (9.8 in) long, taking a clumpy form. The thin oval leaves have smooth edges and pointed tips, and measure up to 2.5 centimeters (0.98 in) in length. The inflorescence bears one or more flowers, each on a long pedicel. Each flower has five pointed green sepals, and some flowers have up to five deeply lobed white petals.
