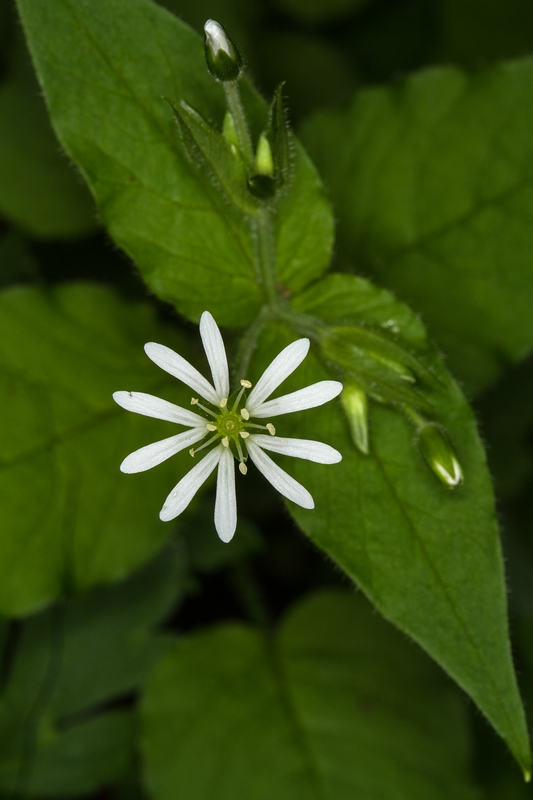

Scientific classification
- Kingdom: Plantae
- Clade: Tracheophytes
- Clade: Angiosperms
- Clade: Eudicots
- Order: Caryophyllales
- Family: Caryophyllaceae
- Genus: Stellaria
- Species: S. nemorum

Binomial name
- Stellaria nemorum L.

= Stellaria nemorum =

Species of flowering plant in the carnation family

Stellaria nemorum, also known by the common name wood stitchwort, is a stoloniferous herbaceous perennial flowering plant in the family Caryophyllaceae.

== Description ==
It reaches a height of 60 cm (24 in) and blooms from May to August. The leaves are opposite, the upper leaves sessile and the lower leaves petiolate. The flowers are white, with 5 deeply bifid petals, 10 stamens and 3 styles.

== Distribution ==
It is native to Europe and thrives in wet places of deciduous forests, such as beech forests.
