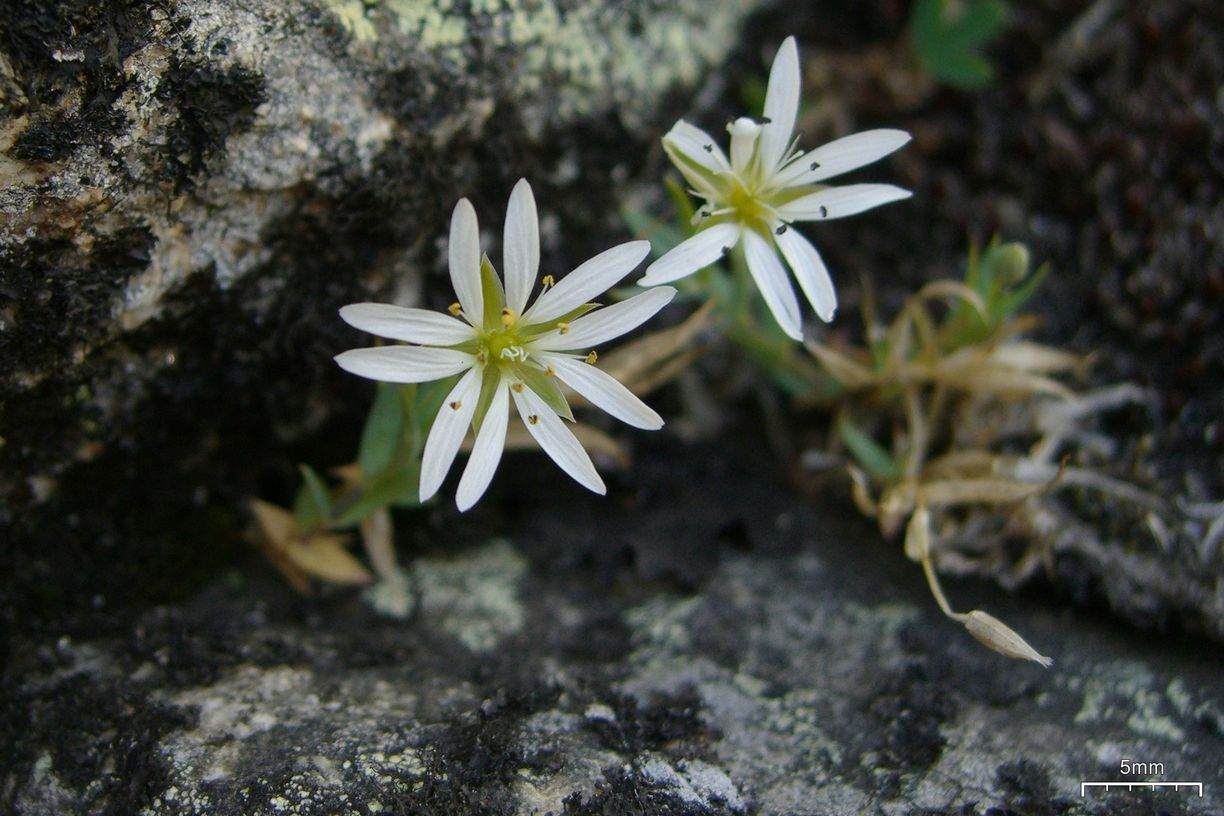

Conservation status
- Secure (NatureServe)

Scientific classification
- Kingdom: Plantae
- Clade: Tracheophytes
- Clade: Angiosperms
- Clade: Eudicots
- Order: Caryophyllales
- Family: Caryophyllaceae
- Genus: Stellaria
- Species: S. longipes

Binomial name
- Stellaria longipes Goldie

Synonyms
- Alsine longipes (Goldie) Coville; Stellularia longipes (Goldie) MacMill.

= Stellaria longipes =

Species of flowering plant

Stellaria longipes is a species of flowering plant in the family Caryophyllaceae known by the common names longstalk starwort and Goldie's starwort. It has a circumpolar distribution, occurring throughout the northernmost latitudes of the Northern Hemisphere. It is a perennial herb that grows in a wide variety of habitat types, including tundra and taiga and many areas further south with subalpine and alpine climates. It is extremely variable in morphology, its form depending on both genetic makeup and environmental conditions. It has a widely varying number of chromosomes. In general, it is a rhizomatous perennial herb forming mats or clumps, or growing upright. The stems may be short and simple or with sprawling and highly branched. The linear to lance-shaped leaves are usually 1 to 4 centimeters long and are oppositely arranged in pairs. The inflorescence bears one or more flowers, each on a short pedicel. The flower has five pointed green sepals each a few millimeters long. There are five white petals each divided into two lobes, sometimes shallowly, but often so deeply there appear to be two petals. The plant is gynodioecious, with some flowers having functional male and female reproductive parts and others being only female.

There are two subtaxa. The rarer of the two, subsp. arenicola, is limited to the sand dunes adjacent to Lake Athabasca in central Canada.
