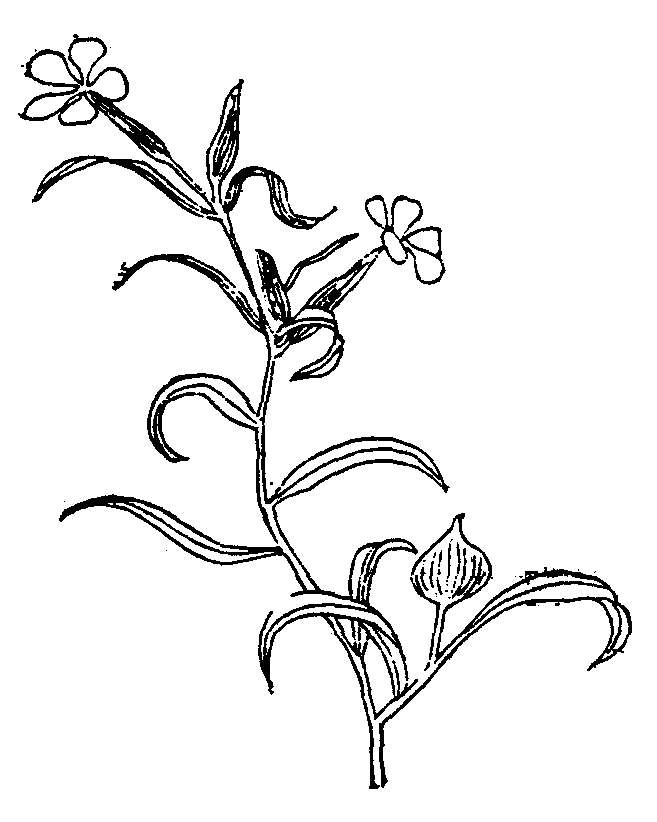

Scientific classification
- Kingdom: Plantae
- Clade: Tracheophytes
- Clade: Angiosperms
- Clade: Eudicots
- Order: Caryophyllales
- Family: Caryophyllaceae
- Genus: Silene
- Species: S. conoidea

Binomial name
- Silene conoidea L.

= Silene conoidea =

Species of flowering plant

Silene conoidea is a species of flowering plant in the family Caryophyllaceae known by the common names weed silene and large sand catchfly. It is native to Eurasia, and it is known in other parts of the world, such as western North America, as a weed.

== Description ==
It is an annual growing up to a meter in height with a hairy, partially glandular stem. The lance-shaped leaves are up to 12 centimetres (4 1/2 inches) long near the base of the plant and smaller higher up. The flower is enclosed in an inflated, hairy, glandular calyx of fused sepals which is ridged with many veins. It is open at the top, revealing five bright pink petals.
