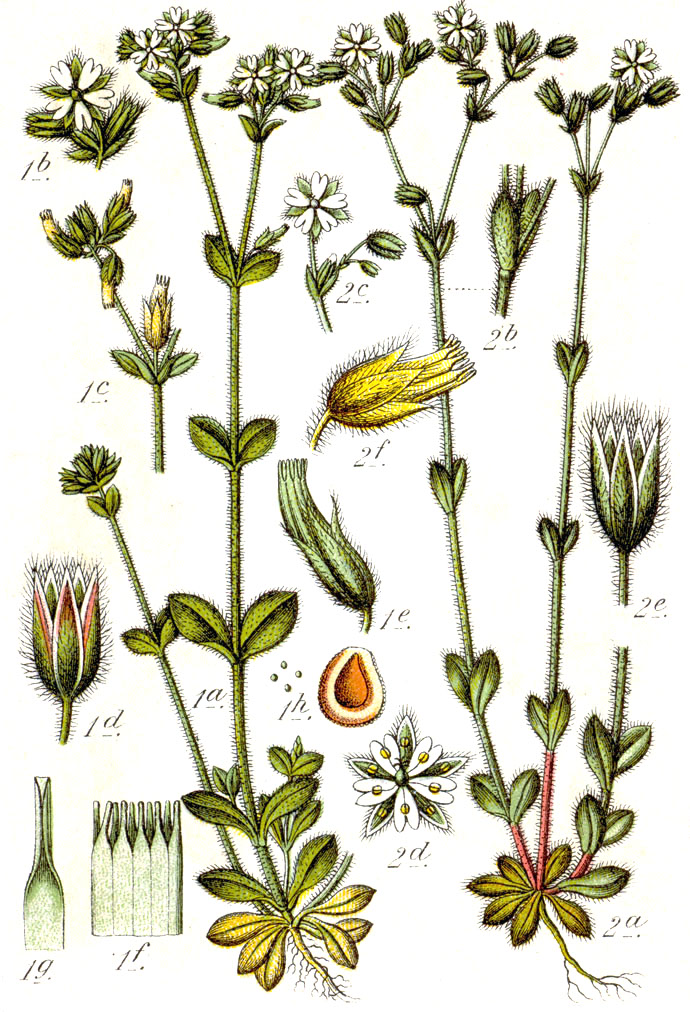
- 1796 botanical illustration

Conservation status
- Secure (NatureServe)

Scientific classification
- Kingdom: Plantae
- Clade: Tracheophytes
- Clade: Angiosperms
- Clade: Eudicots
- Order: Caryophyllales
- Family: Caryophyllaceae
- Genus: Stellaria
- Species: S. borealis

Binomial name
- Stellaria borealis Bigelow

= Stellaria borealis =

Species of flowering plant in the carnation family

Stellaria borealis is a species of flowering plant in the family Caryophyllaceae known by the common name boreal starwort. It has a circumboreal distribution, occurring throughout northern areas of the Northern Hemisphere. It occurs in many types of moist and wet habitat, including marshes, riverbanks, lakesides, floodplains, talus, ditches, and moist spots in forests and woodlands. It is quite variable in appearance, especially across subspecies. In general, it is a rhizomatous perennial herb forming mats of branching, four-angled stems lined with lance-shaped leaves a few centimeters in length. The inflorescence bears many flowers each with five deeply lobed white petals. Some flowers lack petals and have only the five pointed green sepals.

This plant is sometimes infected with the smut fungus Microbotryum violaceum (Microbotyrum stellariae), which causes its anthers to turn red.
