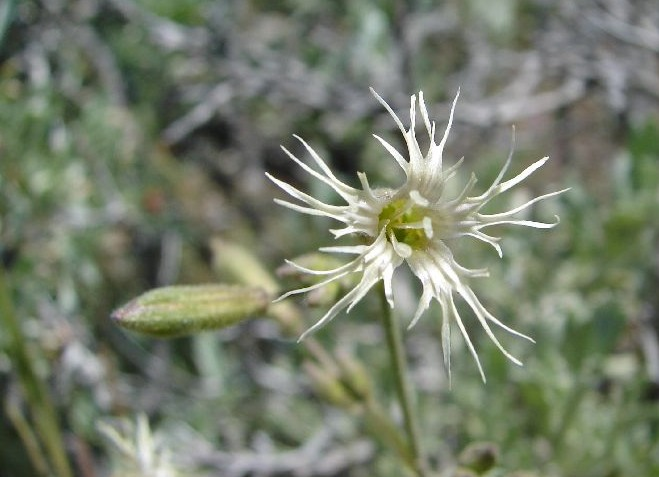

Scientific classification
- Kingdom: Plantae
- Clade: Tracheophytes
- Clade: Angiosperms
- Clade: Eudicots
- Order: Caryophyllales
- Family: Caryophyllaceae
- Genus: Silene
- Species: S. oregana

Binomial name
- Silene oregana S.Watson

= Silene oregana =

Species of flowering plant

Silene oregana is a species of flowering plant in the family Caryophyllaceae known by the common names Oregon silene, Oregon campion and Oregon catchfly. It is native to the western United States, including the Great Basin, where it grows in habitat such as sagebrush and forests. It is a perennial herb growing from a woody caudex and taproot, sending up an upright, mostly unbranched stem which may be 70 centimeters tall. The lance-shaped leaves are up to 8 centimeters long around the caudex, and shorter higher up the stem. Flowers occur in a terminal cyme and sometimes in leaf axils. Each flower is encapsulated in a hairy, glandular calyx of fused sepals. The five petals are creamy white or pink-tinged in color and each has four to six long, fringelike lobes at the tip.
