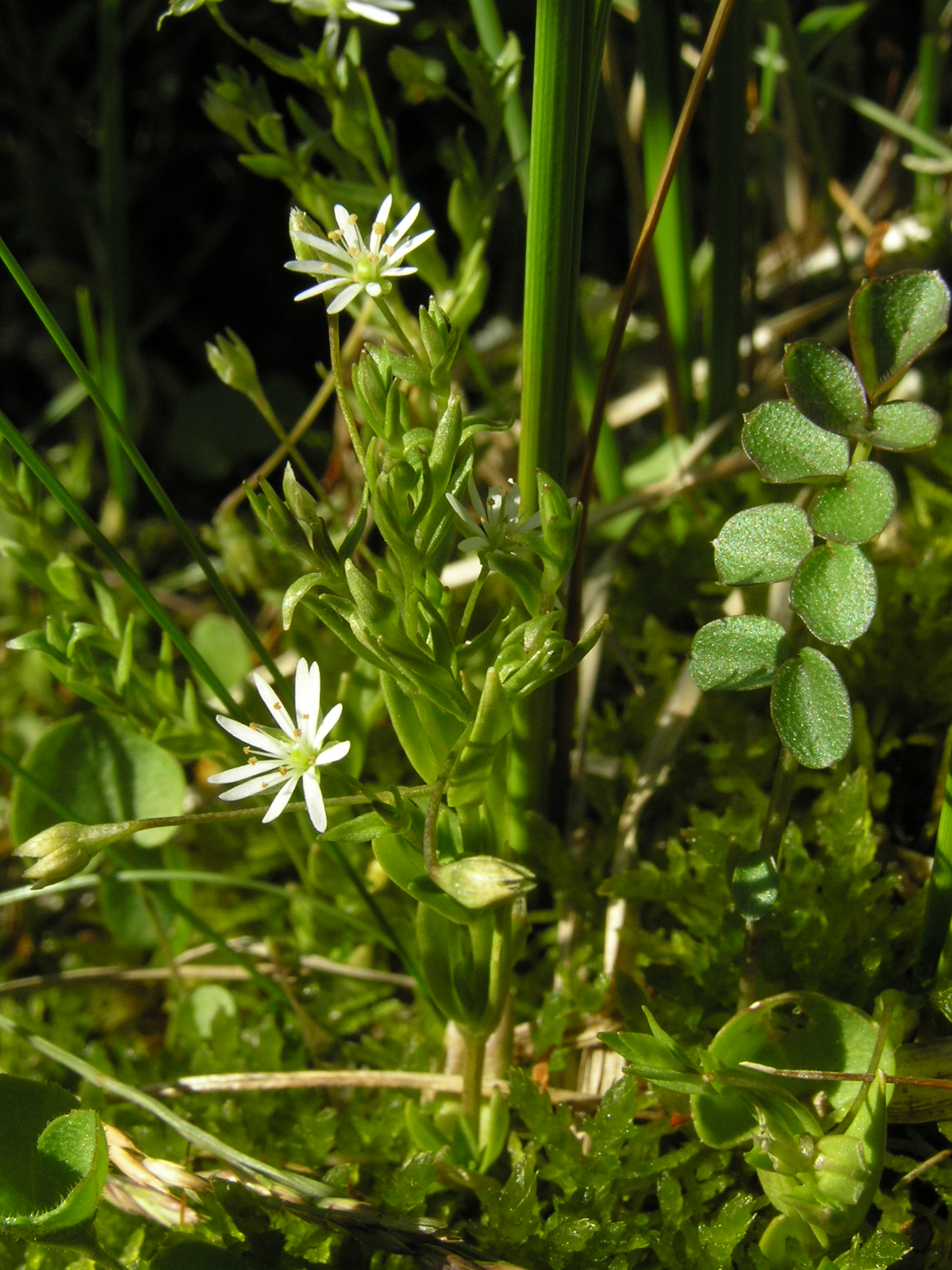
- Stellaria crassifolia var. paludosa

Conservation status
- Secure (NatureServe)

Scientific classification
- Kingdom: Plantae
- Clade: Tracheophytes
- Clade: Angiosperms
- Clade: Eudicots
- Order: Caryophyllales
- Family: Caryophyllaceae
- Genus: Stellaria
- Species: S. crassifolia

Binomial name
- Stellaria crassifolia Ehrh.

= Stellaria crassifolia =

Species of flowering plant in the carnation family

Stellaria crassifolia, the fleshy starwort, is a species of flowering plant in the carnation family Caryophyllaceae, found in northern North America, Europe, and Asia. Its common Icelandish name is "Stjörnuarfi" (star-weed).
