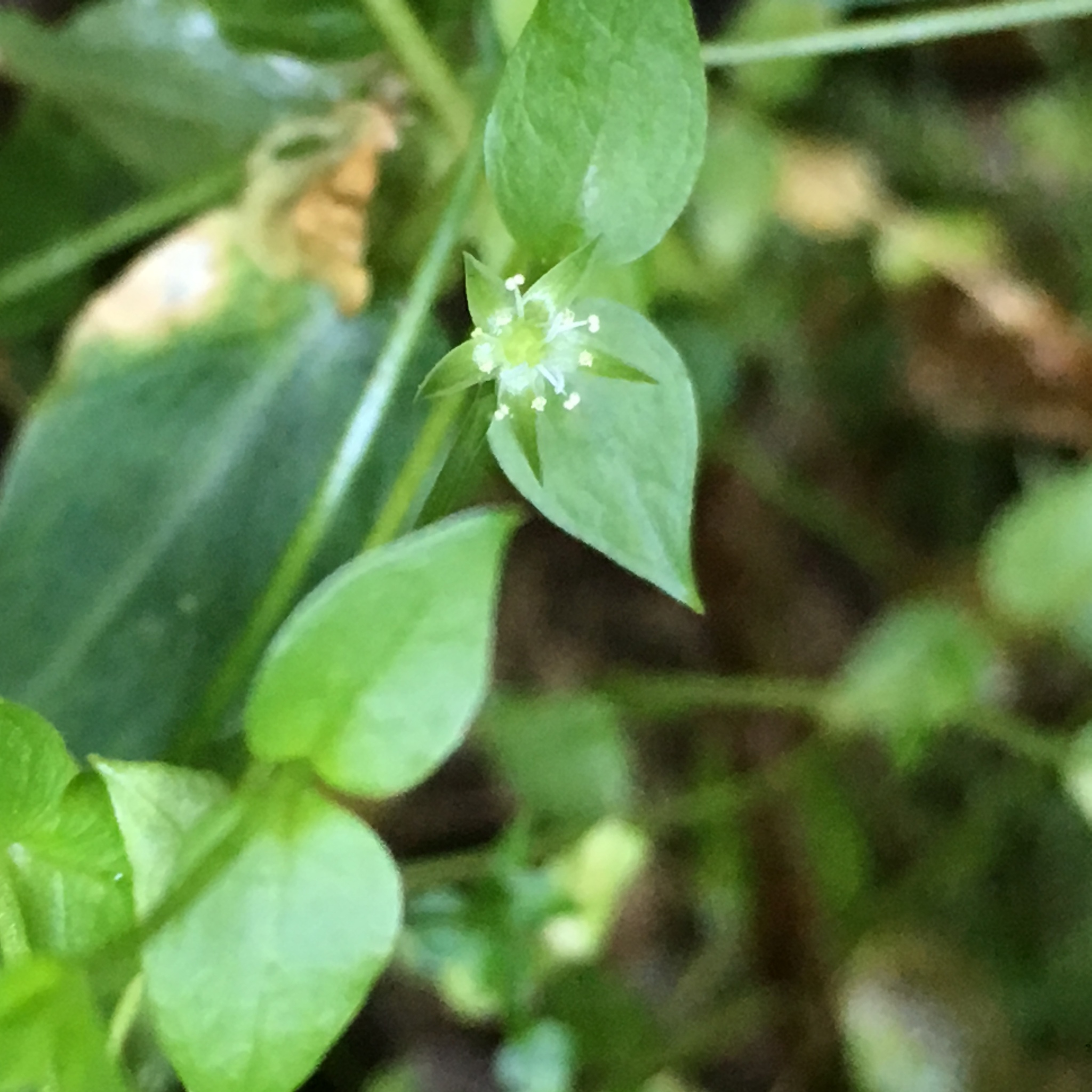

Scientific classification
- Kingdom: Plantae
- Clade: Tracheophytes
- Clade: Angiosperms
- Clade: Eudicots
- Order: Caryophyllales
- Family: Caryophyllaceae
- Genus: Stellaria
- Species: S. crispa

Binomial name
- Stellaria crispa Cham. & Schltdl.

Synonyms
- Alsine crispa

= Stellaria crispa =

Species of flowering plant in the carnation family

Stellaria crispa is a species of flowering plant in the family Caryophyllaceae known by the common names curled starwort and crisp starwort. It is native to western North America from Alaska south to California and Wyoming, where it grows in moist, shady habitat such as deep forests and streambanks. It is a rhizomatous perennial herb producing a mat of prostrate or trailing stems up to about 40 centimeters (16 in) long. It is lined with opposite pairs of pointed oval leaves each 1–2 centimeters (0.4–0.8 in) long. Single flowers occur in the leaf axils, each borne on a short pedicel. The flower has five pointed green sepals each a few millimeters long. Some flowers have one or more petals, but most lack these.
