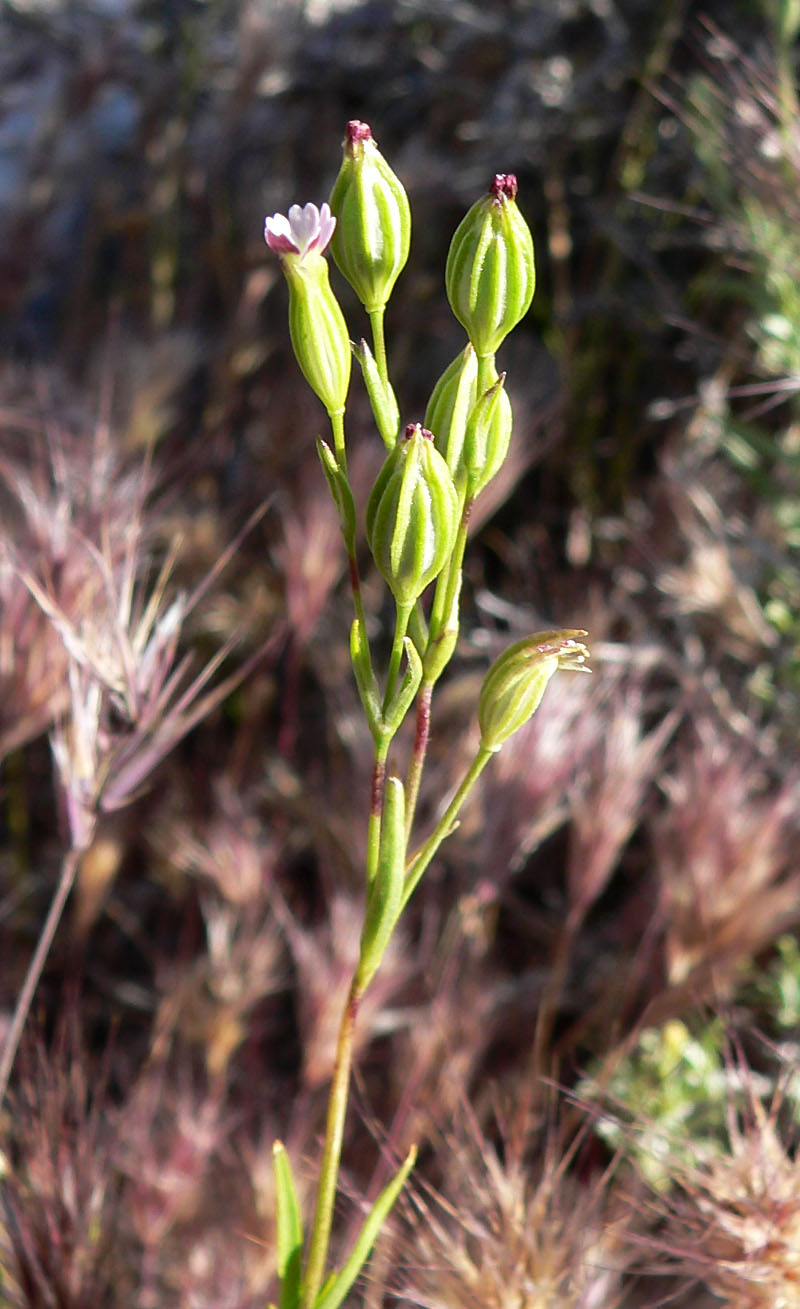

Conservation status
- Secure (NatureServe)

Scientific classification
- Kingdom: Plantae
- Clade: Tracheophytes
- Clade: Angiosperms
- Clade: Eudicots
- Order: Caryophyllales
- Family: Caryophyllaceae
- Genus: Silene
- Species: S. antirrhina

Binomial name
- Silene antirrhina L.

= Silene antirrhina =

Species of flowering plant

Silene antirrhina is a species of flowering plant in the family Caryophyllaceae known by the common names sleepy silene and sleepy catchfly. It is native to North America and has been introduced to South America and Europe.

== Description ==
Silene antirrhina is quite variable in appearance, its morphology depending on several environmental factors, such as moisture level and available nutrients. In general, it is an annual herb growing upright to a maximum height near 80 centimeters (31 inches).

The slender stem grows from a taproot and branches near the top. There are dark-colored internodes on the stem, the upper ones often glandular and sticky in texture. Insects become trapped in the sticky patches on this protocarnivorous plant, but it does not obtain any nutrients from them. The lance-shaped leaves are up to 6 cm (2 1/4 in) long near the base of the stem, and are smaller and narrower higher up.

The flower is enveloped in an inflated ovate calyx of fused sepals with ten veins. The calyx is open at the top, often revealing five double-lobed petals in shades of pink, red, or purple to white; the petals are sometimes absent.

== Distribution and habitat ==
Silene antirrhina is native to North America. According to Plants of the World Online (POWO), its native range is from Canada to Mexico. POWO does not include South America as part of its native range.

In South America, several sources treat it an introduced species. Argentina lists it as an "Exotic Invasive Species, Category 1". The Uruguayan Flora also list it exotic. The Flora del Conosur (Instituto Darwinion) lists it as "Introducida" in Argentina, Brazil, Paraguay, and Uruguay.

Some sources, like the Flora of the Southeastern United States, say that its status in South America is debated. Some authors consider it native. But, POWO and several South American botanical sources treat it as introduced.
