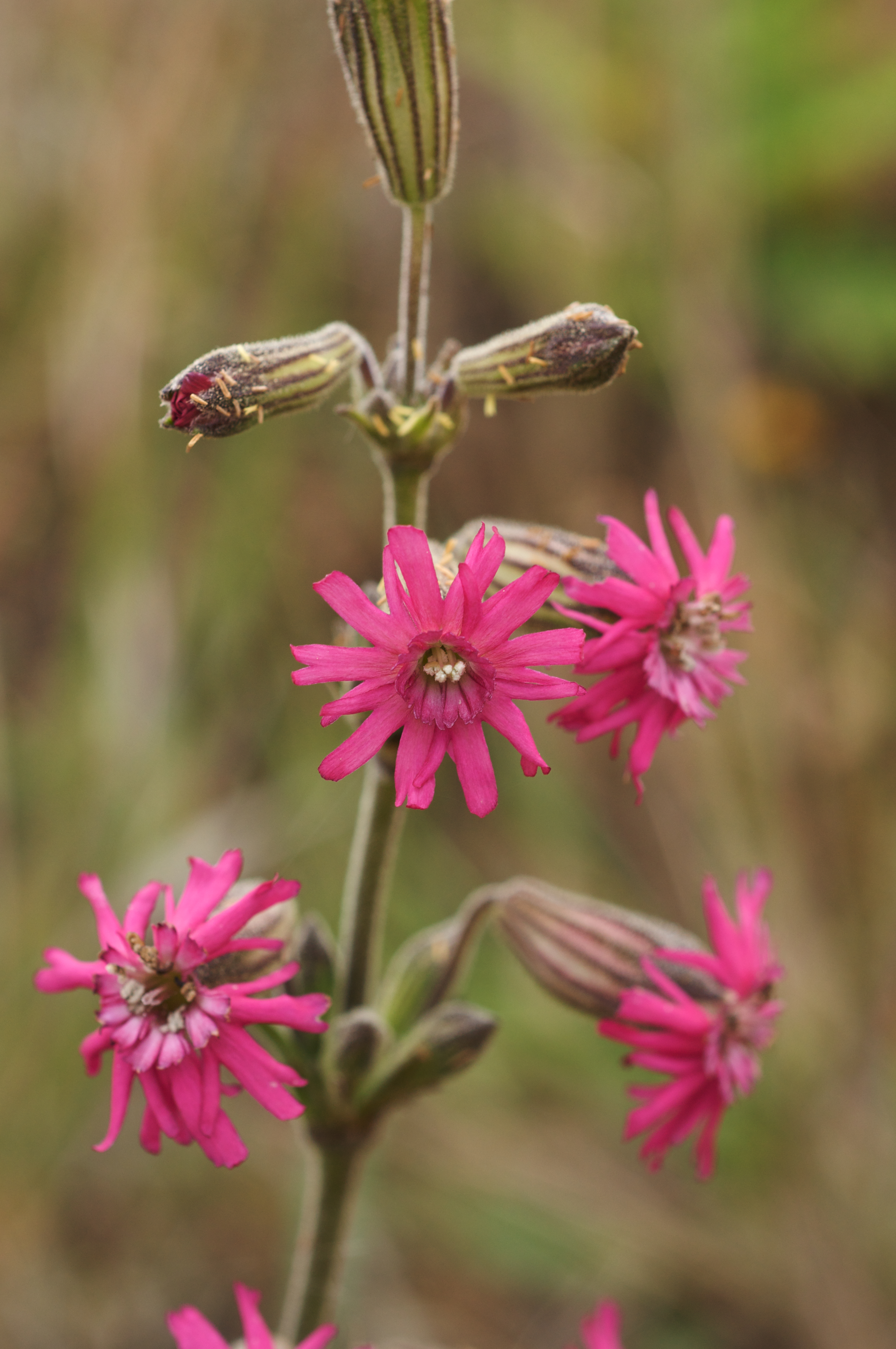
- Silene scouleri subsp. scouleri

Conservation status
- Secure (NatureServe)

Scientific classification
- Kingdom: Plantae
- Clade: Tracheophytes
- Clade: Angiosperms
- Clade: Eudicots
- Order: Caryophyllales
- Family: Caryophyllaceae
- Genus: Silene
- Species: S. scouleri

Binomial name
- Silene scouleri Hook.

= Silene scouleri =

Species of flowering plant

Silene scouleri is a species of flowering plant in the family Caryophyllaceae known by the common names simple campion and Scouler's catchfly.

It is native to western North America from British Columbia to California to Colorado. There are at least three subspecies which all vary in size, shape, habitat preference, and distribution. Some individuals are difficult to assign to a subspecies.

== Description ==
''Silene scouleri is a perennial herb producing one or more erect stems from a woody, branching caudex. The stem is usually unbranched, or simple, giving the plant its common name.

The inflorescence may have few or many flowers in a dense or open cluster. Each flower has a tubular or bell-shaped calyx of fused sepals which has stark purple or green veins. The petals are white, sometimes with a greenish or pinkish tinge, or solid pink. They may have two to four lobes which are wide or narrow, rounded or pointed.

=== Subspecies ===
- Silene scouleri ssp. hallii — Hall's catchfly; in several areas of the Rocky Mountains, especially in Colorado. It has white, greenish, pinkish, or purple-tipped petals with two lobes, often with teeth along the sides.
- Silene scouleri ssp. pringlei — Pringle's catchfly; in the Southwestern United States and Northwestern Mexico, where it grows in mountains and canyons. It is slender and hairy. The petals are white, or green- or purple-tinged, and are deeply divided into fringelike lobes.
- Silene scouleri ssp. scouleri — Scouler's catchfly; along the Pacific coast from British Columbia to central California, and some areas inland. It grows in coastal prairie, bluffs, and other habitat. Its petals are white or pinkish, with two or four lobes and sometimes lateral teeth.
