= Stellaria irrigua =

Conservation status
- Apparently Secure (NatureServe)

Scientific classification
- Kingdom: Plantae
- Clade: Tracheophytes
- Clade: Angiosperms
- Clade: Eudicots
- Order: Caryophyllales
- Family: Caryophyllaceae
- Genus: Stellaria
- Species: S. irrigua

Binomial name
- Stellaria irrigua Bunge

Synonyms
- List: Alsine baicalensis Coville; Stellaria gonomischa B.Boivin; Stellaria leiosperma Pobed.; Stellaria subumbellata Edgew.; Stellaria subumbellata f. villosa H.Chuang; Stellaria umbellata Kar. & Kir.; Stellaria weberi B.Boivin; Stellaria wutaica Hand.-Mazz.

Species of flowering plant

Stellaria irrigua is a species of flowering plant in the family Caryophyllaceae known by the common names umbrella starwort and umbellate starwort. It is native to western North America from Alaska and north-western Canada to the south-western United States, as well as parts of Asia, including Siberia. It grows in subalpine and alpine climates in mountain forests and riverbanks. It is a rhizomatous perennial herb producing a slender prostrate stem up to about 20 centimeters long, sometimes forming clumps or mats. The stem is lined with pairs of oval leaves each up to about 2 centimeters long. The inflorescence is an umbel-shaped array of several flowers each on an arching or erect pedicels. The flower has five pointed green sepals each no more than 3 millimeters long. There are occasionally tiny white petals within the calyx of sepals, but these are generally absent.
