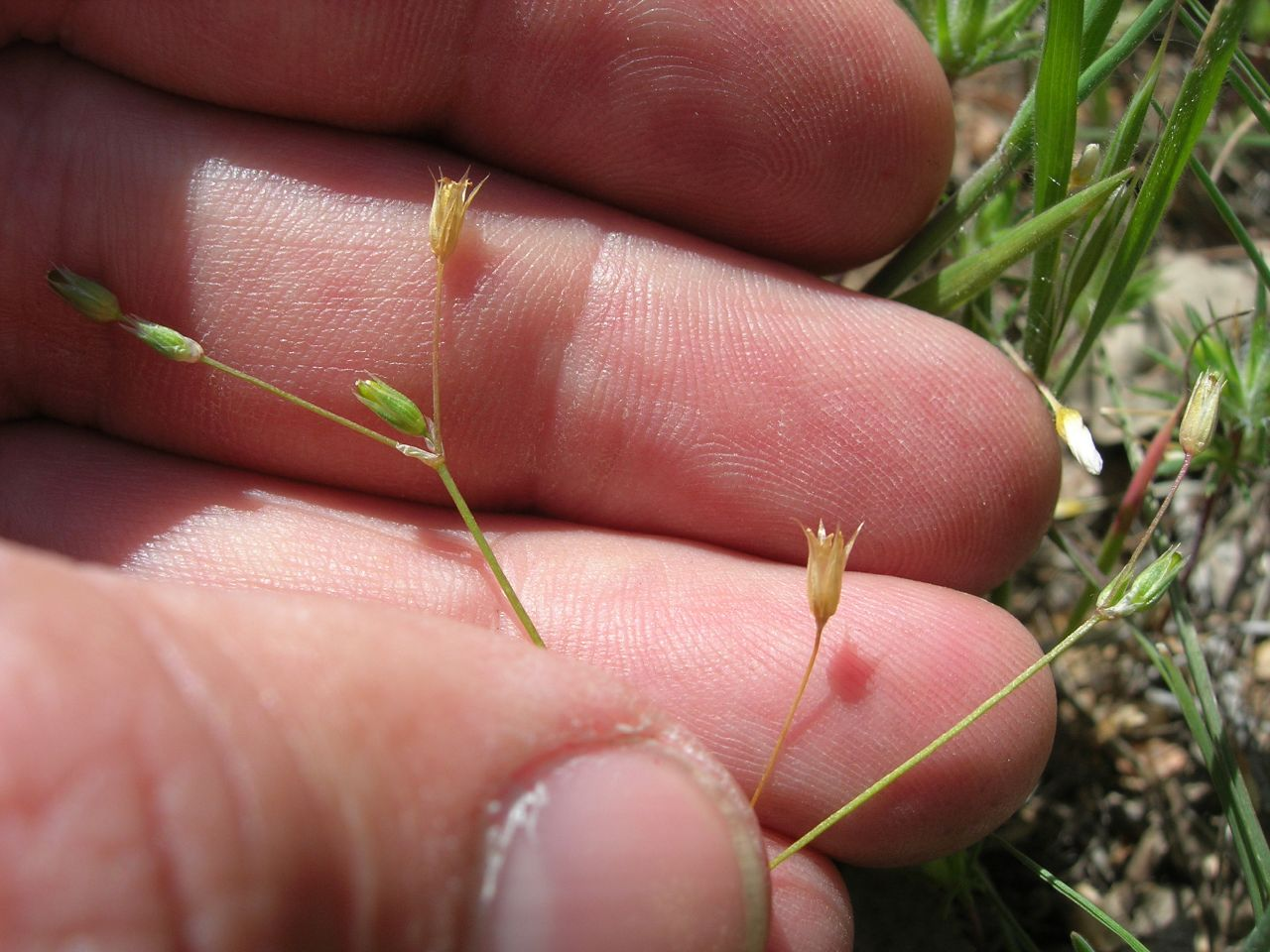

Scientific classification
- Kingdom: Plantae
- Clade: Tracheophytes
- Clade: Angiosperms
- Clade: Eudicots
- Order: Caryophyllales
- Family: Caryophyllaceae
- Genus: Stellaria
- Species: S. nitens

Binomial name
- Stellaria nitens Nutt.

Synonyms
- Stellaria praecox

= Stellaria nitens =

Species of flowering plant in the carnation family

Stellaria nitens is a species of flowering plant in the family Caryophyllaceae known by the common names shiny chickweed and shining starwort. It is native to western North America, including British Columbia, Alberta, and the western United States, its distribution extending into Mexico at least as far as Baja California. It grows in many types of habitat, in dry and moist areas, and sometimes in disturbed places. It is an annual herb producing a slender, upright, four-angled stem from a thin taproot, reaching up to about 25 centimeters (9.8 in) in height. Most of the leaves are located low on the stem, each measuring up to 1.5 centimeters (0.59 in) long, with smaller, narrower leaves occurring above. The leaves are hairless except for some rough hairs along the margins, and the blades have shiny surfaces. The inflorescence bears a few flowers on short pedicels. The flower has five pointed sepals each a few millimeters long. There are sometimes five tiny white petals as well, though these are often absent.
