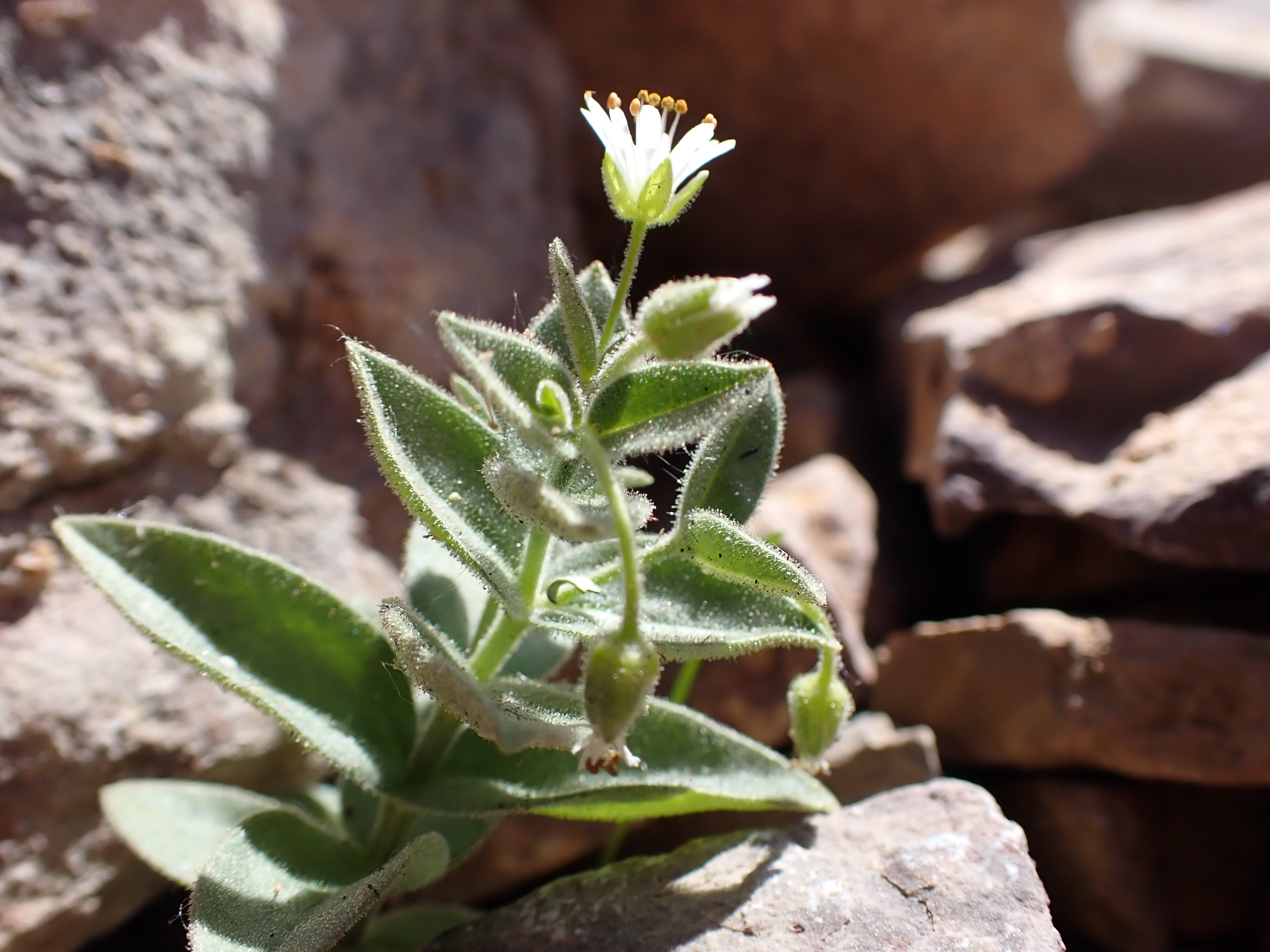

Scientific classification
- Kingdom: Plantae
- Clade: Tracheophytes
- Clade: Angiosperms
- Clade: Eudicots
- Order: Caryophyllales
- Family: Caryophyllaceae
- Genus: Hesperostellaria; Gang Yao, B.Xue & Z.Q.Song
- Species: H. americana

Binomial name
- Hesperostellaria americana (Porter ex B.L.Rob.) Gang Yao, B.Xue & Z.Q.Song

Synonyms
- Alsine americana (Porter ex B.L.Rob.) Rydb.; Arenaria stephaniana var. americana (Porter ex B.L.Rob.) Shinners; Schizotechium americanum (Porter ex B.L.Rob.) Arabi, Rabeler & Zarre; Stellaria americana (Porter ex B.L.Rob.) Standl.; Stellaria dichotoma var. americana Porter ex B.L.Rob. (1894) (basionym)

= Hesperostellaria =

Genus of flowering plants

Hesperostellaria is a genus of flowering plants in the family Caryophyllaceae. It contains a single species, Hesperostellaria americana, a perennial native to subalpine areas of Alberta and Montana.

The species was first described as Stellaria dichotoma var. americana in 1894, and later renamed Stellaria americana. In 2023 it was placed in the new monotypic genus Hesperostellaria as Hesperostellaria americana.
