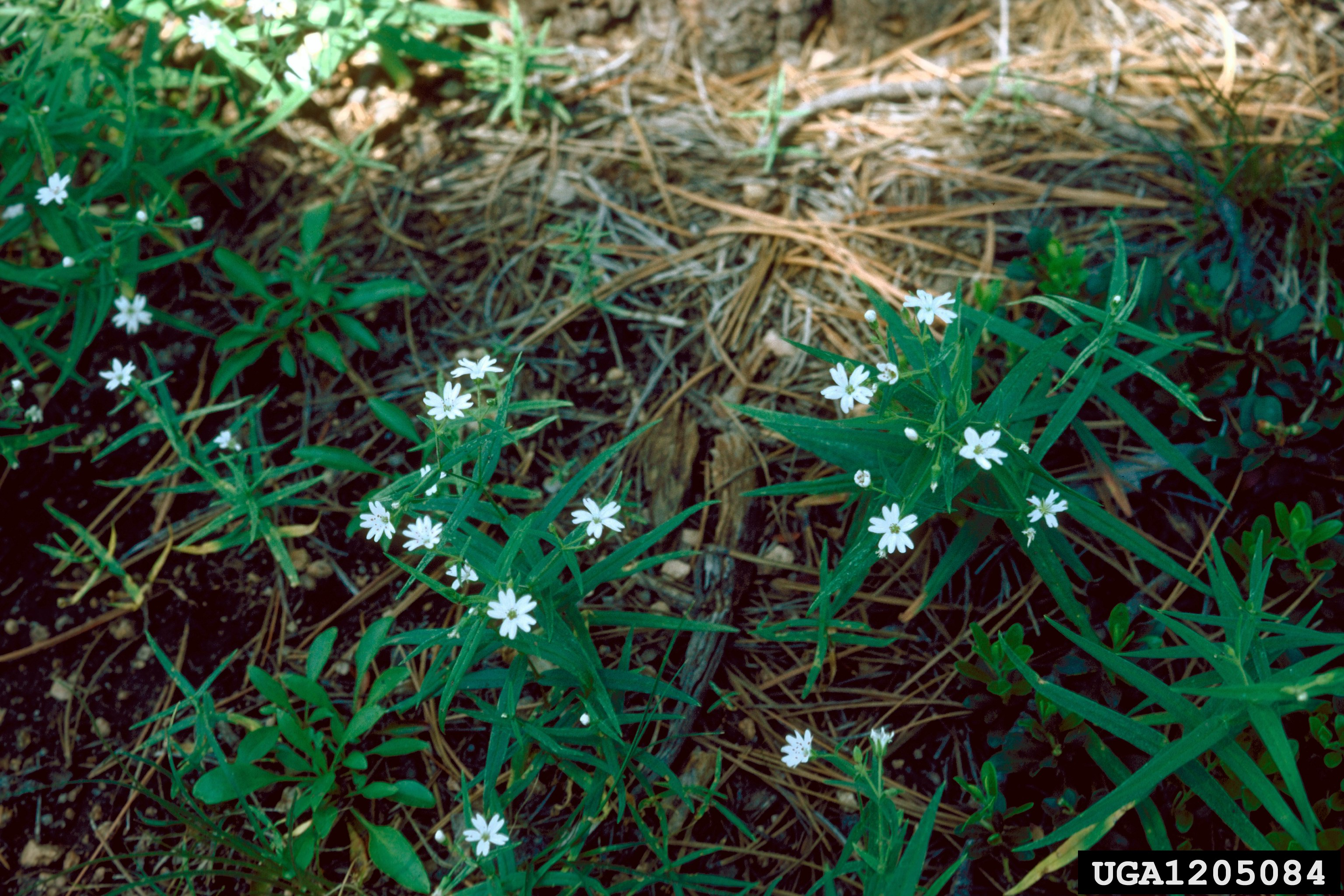

Scientific classification
- Kingdom: Plantae
- Clade: Tracheophytes
- Clade: Angiosperms
- Clade: Eudicots
- Order: Caryophyllales
- Family: Caryophyllaceae
- Genus: Torreyostellaria; Gang Yao, B.Xue & Z.Q.Song
- Species: T. jamesiana

Binomial name
- Torreyostellaria jamesiana (Torr.) Gang Yao, B.Xue & Z.Q.Song

Synonyms
- List: Alsine jamesiana (Torr.) A.Heller; Alsine jamesiana (Torr.) Bolzinger; Arenaria jamesiana (Torr.) Shinners; Pseudostellaria jamesiana (Torr.) W.A.Weber & R.L.Hartm.; Schizotechium jamesianum (Torr.) Arabi, Rabeler & Zarre; Stellaria jamesiana Torr.; Alsine curtisii Rydb.; Alsine glutinosa A.Heller

= Torreyostellaria =

Genus of flowering plants

Torreyostellaria is a genus of flowering plants in the family Caryophyllaceae. It is monotypic, being represented by the single species Torreyostellaria jamesiana, commonly known as tuber starwort and sticky starwort, It is native to much of the western United States, where it can be found in sagebrush, coniferous forests, and many other types of habitat.

== Description ==
Torreyostellaria jamesiana is a perennial herb growing from a rhizome network with tuberlike swellings. The stem grows up to 45 to 60 centimeters in maximum height. It is four-angled and usually at least partially coated in glandular hairs. The thick lance-shaped leaves are up to 15 centimeters long, oppositely arranged, and sometimes rough and hairy. The inflorescence is a cluster of flowers at the tip of the stem or in the leaf axils. Flowers occurring in leaf axils are sometimes cleistogamous, never opening. Open flowers have five white petals with two lobes at the tips and usually ten long stamens.
