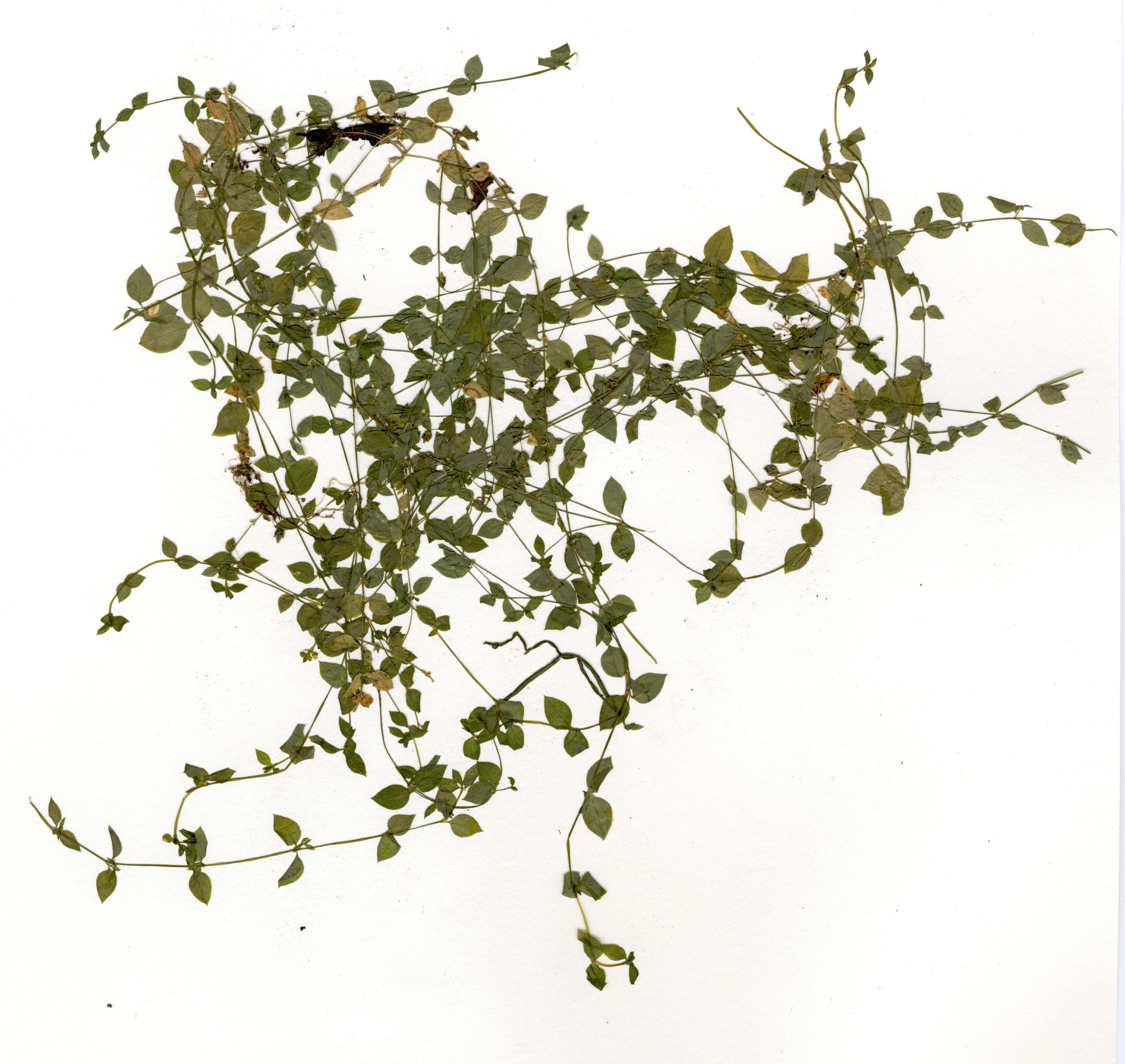
- herbarium specimen

Conservation status
- Secure (NatureServe)

Scientific classification
- Kingdom: Plantae
- Clade: Tracheophytes
- Clade: Angiosperms
- Clade: Eudicots
- Order: Caryophyllales
- Family: Caryophyllaceae
- Genus: Engellaria; Iamonico (2021)
- Species: E. obtusa

Binomial name
- Engellaria obtusa (Engelm.) Iamonico (2021)

Synonyms
- Alsine obtusa (Engelm.) Rose (1896); Alsine viridula Piper (1913); Alsine washingtoniana (B.L.Rob.) A.Heller (1900); Stellaria obtusa Engelm. (1882) (basionym); Stellaria viridula (Piper) H.St.John (1925); Stellaria washingtoniana B.L.Rob. (1898)

= Engellaria =

Species of flowering plant

Engellaria obtusa (synonym Stellaria obtusa) is a species of flowering plant in the family Caryophyllaceae known by the common names Rocky Mountain chickweed, blunt-sepaled starwort, and obtuse starwort. It is the sole species in genus Engellaria. It is native to western North America, from British Columbia and Alberta to California to Colorado, where it grows in moist areas in forests and on mountain slopes.

It is a rhizomatous perennial herb producing a prostrate, creeping, branching stem up to about 20 centimeters long, sometimes forming mats. The oval leaves are up to about a centimeter long and are borne in opposite pairs on the stem. Solitary flowers occur in the leaf axils, each borne on a short pedicel. The small flower has no petals, just four to five blunt-tipped green sepals each a few millimeters long.
