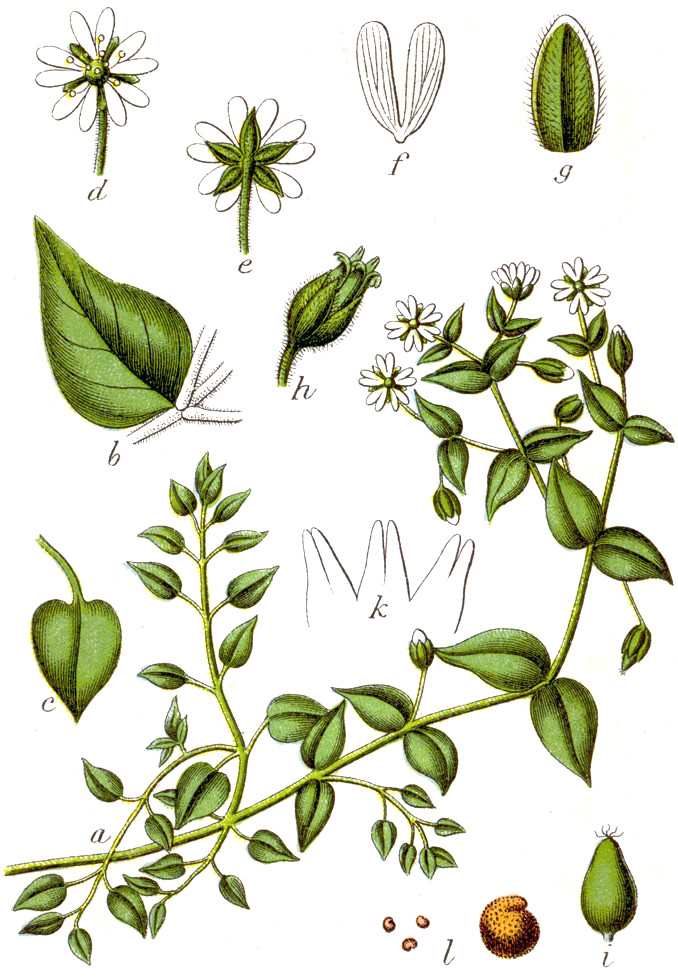

Scientific classification
- Kingdom: Plantae
- Clade: Tracheophytes
- Clade: Angiosperms
- Clade: Eudicots
- Order: Caryophyllales
- Family: Caryophyllaceae
- Genus: Stellaria
- Species: S. aquatica

Binomial name
- Stellaria aquatica (L.) Scop

Synonyms
- Myosoton aquaticum (L.) Moench

= Stellaria aquatica =

Species of flowering plant in the carnation family

Stellaria aquatica is a species of flowering plant in the carnation family Caryophyllaceae, known as water chickweed or giant chickweed. It is a perennial herbaceous dicot plant with stems between 10 and 100 cm (4 and 40 in) high, growing in humid, wet areas, for example, on the sides of gutters or under or between bushes. It occurs naturally in the temperate regions of central and western Europe. The flowers are white. The plants bloom between June and August.

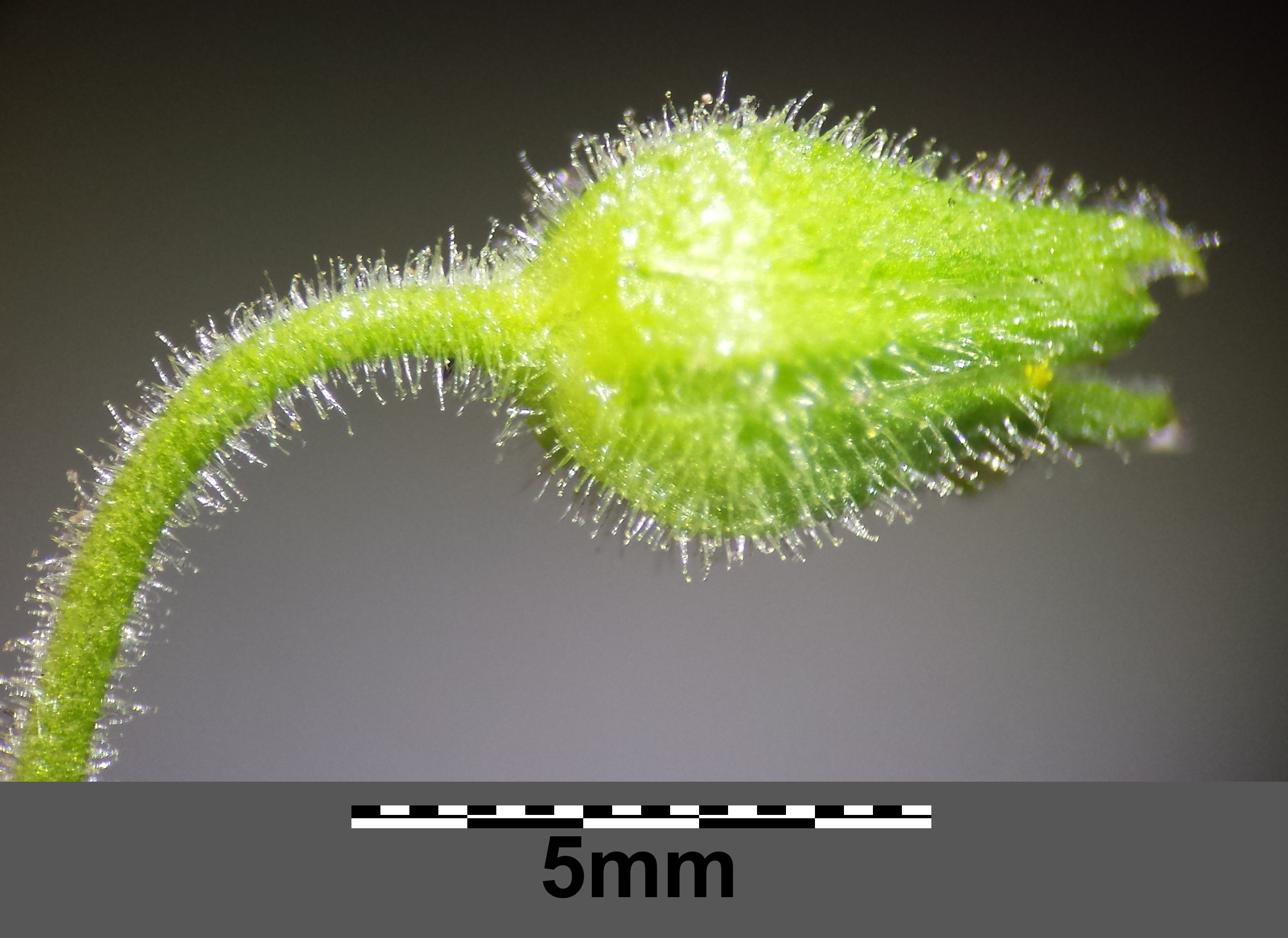

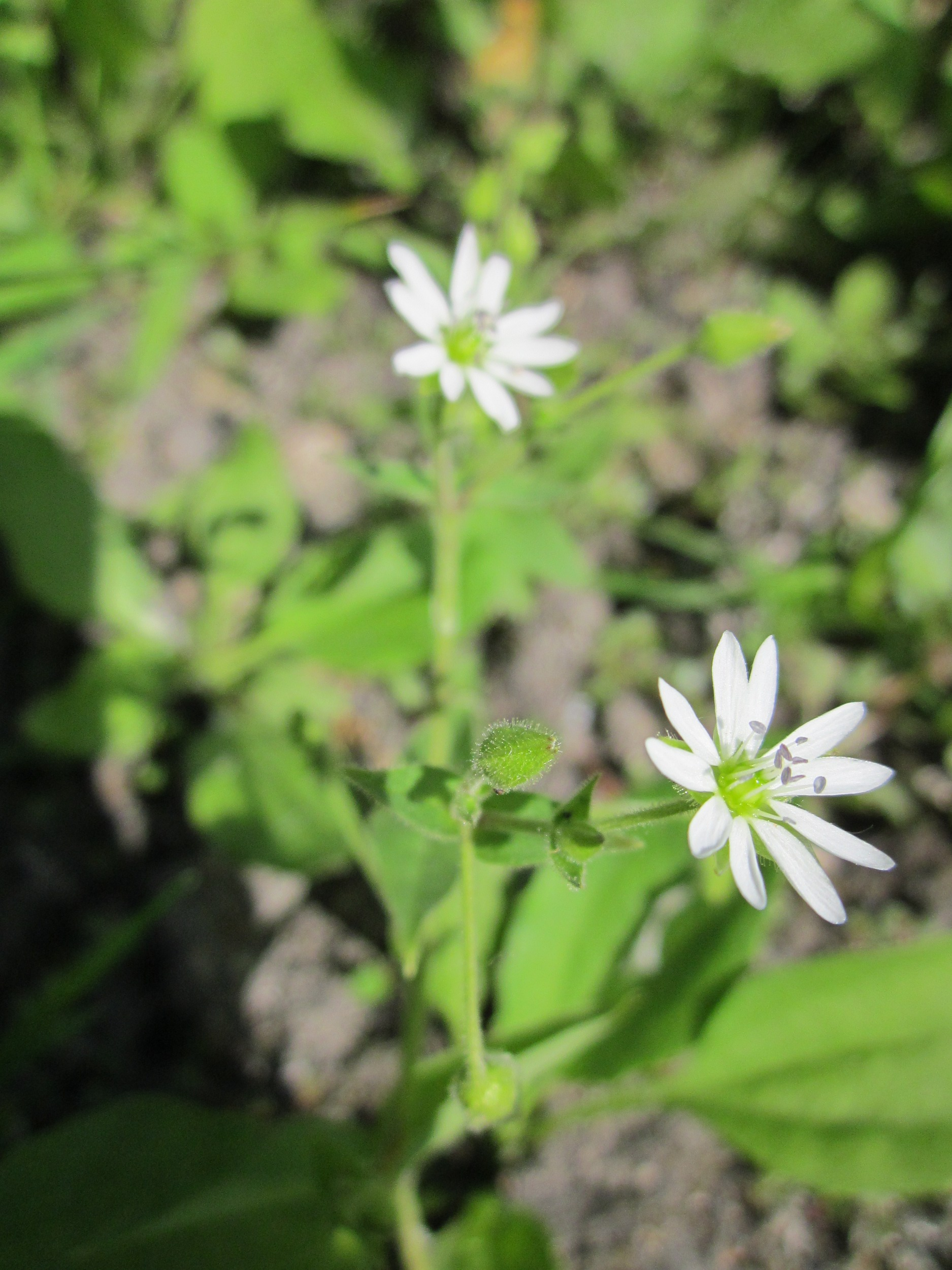

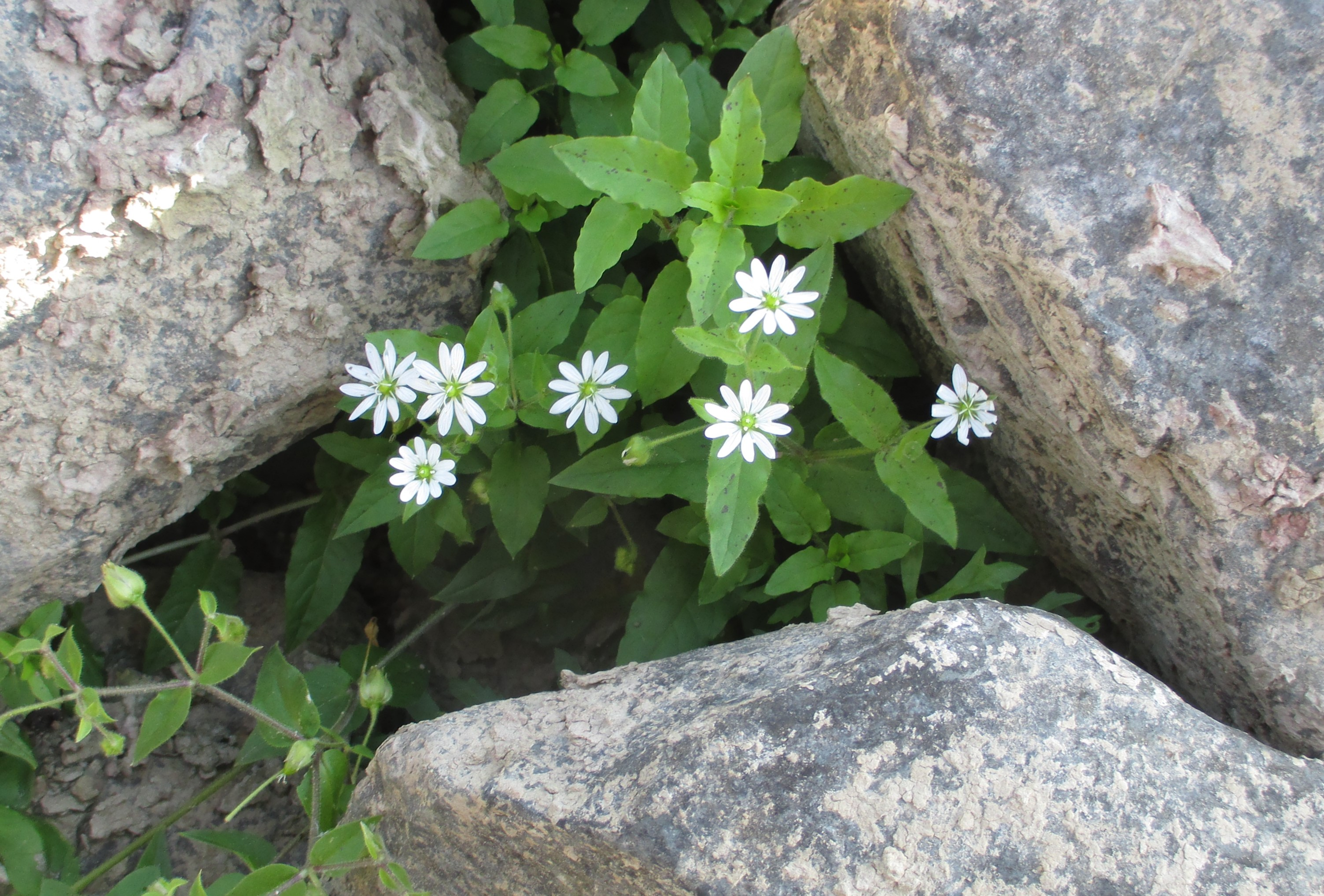
