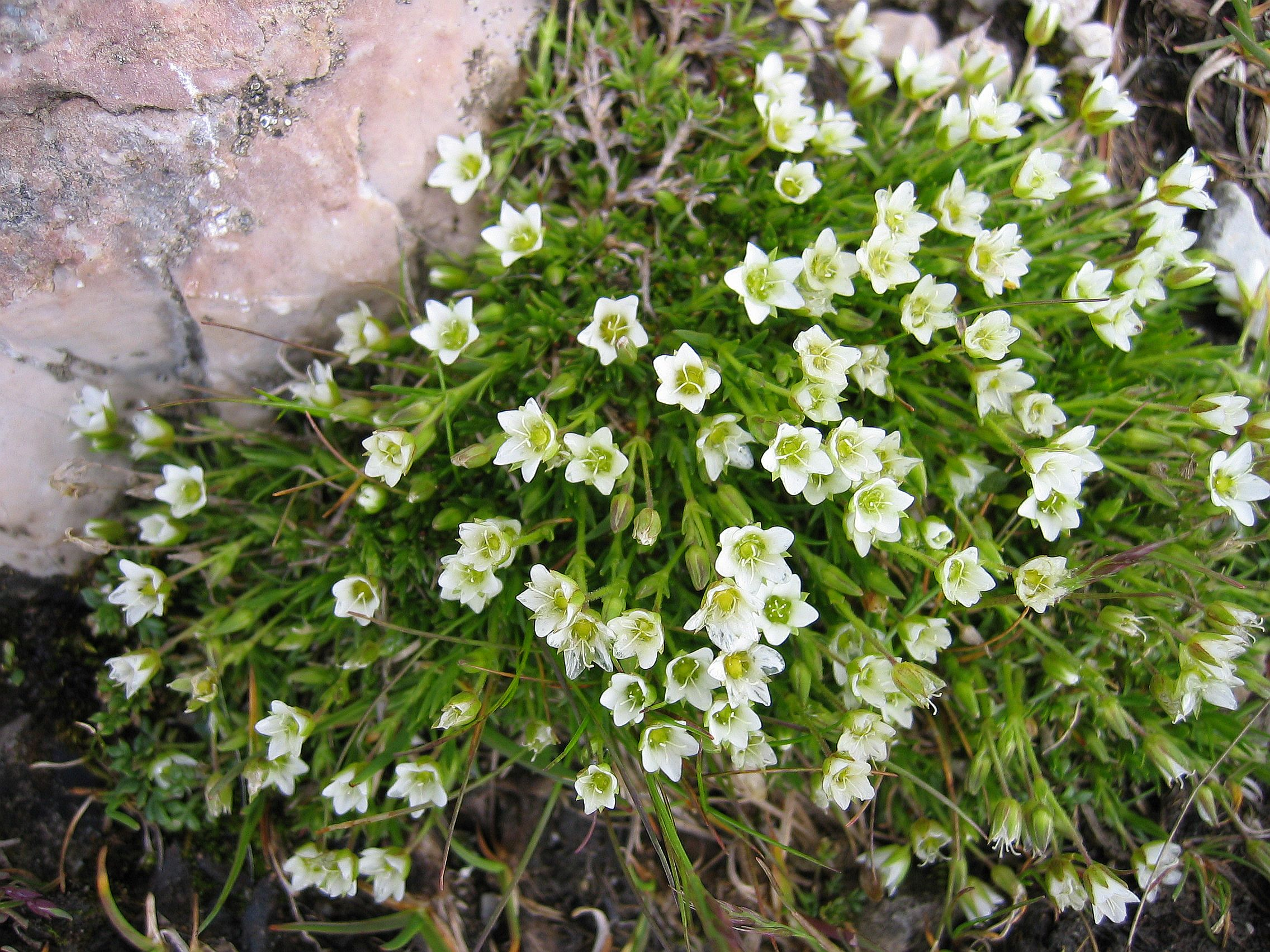
- Minuartia gerardii

Scientific classification
- Kingdom: Plantae
- Clade: Tracheophytes
- Clade: Angiosperms
- Clade: Eudicots
- Order: Caryophyllales
- Family: Caryophyllaceae
- Genus: Minuartia; Loefl. (1753)

Type species
- Minuartia dichotoma L.

Species
- 67; see text

Synonyms
- Alsine Gaertn. (1791), nom. illeg.; Alsinopsis Small (1903); Phlebanthia Rchb. (1843); Queria L. (1753)

= Minuartia =

Genus of flowering plants in the carnation family

Minuartia is a genus of flowering plants commonly known as sandworts in the family Caryophyllaceae.

Minuartias are small annual or perennial plants which grow in otherwise inhospitable conditions such as on rocky ledges and in stony soil. Species are distributed in Eurasia and parts of Africa, including Europe, the Mediterranean region, northern and eastern Africa, the Caucasus, western and central Asia, Japan, and Far Eastern Russia.

Many Minuartia species were formerly classed in the genus Arenaria, and the obsolete genus Alsine. In 2014, the polyphyletic Minuartia sensu lato was recircumscribed, with many of the species transferred to other genera, including Cherleria, Eremogone, Facchinia, Mcneillia, Minuartiella, Mononeuria, Pseudocherleria, Rhodalsine, Sabulina, and Triplateia. Minuartia sensu stricto is characterized by the following features: leaves linear-setaceous; 5 acute sepals with 3, 5, or 9 veins; 5 white petals; 3 styles, forming 3-parted capsules.

The genus was named for Juan Minuart (1693–1768), a Spanish botanist and pharmacist.

== Species ==
67 species are accepted.

- Minuartia abchasica Schischk.
- Minuartia adenotricha Schischk.
- Minuartia aksoyi Koç & Hamzaoğlu
- Minuartia alpuensis Çilden & Altınözlü
- Minuartia anatolica (Boiss.) Woronow
- Minuartia athoa (Griseb.) Kamari
- Minuartia bosniaca (Beck) K.Malý – Bosnian sandwort
- Minuartia bulgarica (Velen.) Graebn.
- Minuartia buschiana Schischk.
- Minuartia campestris L.
- Minuartia confusa (Boiss.) Maire & Petitm.
- Minuartia corymbulosa (Boiss. & Balansa) McNeill
- Minuartia cymifera (Rouy & Foucaud) Graebn.
- Minuartia decipiens (Fenzl) Bornm.
- Minuartia dichotoma L.
- Minuartia ebracteolata Majumdar & G.S.Giri
- Minuartia ellenbeckii (Engl.) M.G.Gilbert
- Minuartia erythrosepala (Boiss.) Hand.-Mazz.
- Minuartia eurytanica (Boiss. & Heldr.) Hand.-Mazz.
- Minuartia euxina Klokov
- Minuartia filifolia (Forssk.) Mattf.
- Minuartia funkii (Jord.) Graebn.
- Minuartia globulosa (Labill.) Schinz & Thell.
- Minuartia glomerata (M.Bieb.) Degen
- Minuartia granuliflora (Fenzl) Grossh.
- Minuartia greuteriana Kamari
- Minuartia hamata (Hausskn. & Bornm.) Mattf.
- Minuartia hamzaoglui Koç & Aksoy
- Minuartia hirsuta (M.Bieb.) Hand.-Mazz.
- Minuartia hondoensis (Ohwi) Ohwi
- Minuartia innominata McNeill
- Minuartia intermedia (Boiss.) Hand.-Mazz.
- Minuartia isaurica McNeill
- Minuartia kitanovii Panov
- Minuartia krascheninnikovii Schischk.
- Minuartia lanuginosa (H.J.Coste) Braun-Blanq.
- Minuartia leucocephala (Boiss.) Mattf.
- Minuartia leucocephaloides (Bornm.) Bornm.
- Minuartia libanotica (Boiss.) Bornm.
- Minuartia mairei Quézel
- Minuartia meyeri (Boiss.) Bornm.
- Minuartia micrantha Schischk.
- Minuartia montana L.
- Minuartia mucronata (L.) Schinz & Thell.
- Minuartia multinervis (Boiss.) Bornm.
- Minuartia nifensis McNeill
- Minuartia palyzanica Proskur.
- Minuartia parvulorum Mouterde & Sam. ex Rech.f.
- Minuartia pauciflora (Kit.) Dvořáková
- Minuartia perdita Dvořáková
- Minuartia recurva (All.) Schinz & Thell. – recurved sandwort, sickle-leaved sandwort
- Minuartia rostrata (Pers.) Rchb.
- Minuartia rumelica Panov
- Minuartia sandwithii Maire & N.D.Simpson
- Minuartia sclerantha (Fisch. & C.A.Mey.) Thell.
- Minuartia setacea (Thuill.) Hayek
- Minuartia sintenisii (H.Lindb.) Rech.f. – Troodos sandwort
- Minuartia smejkalii (Dvořáková)
- Minuartia stereoneura Mattf.
- Minuartia stojanovii (Kitan.) Kožuharov & Kuzmanov
- Minuartia strandjensis Panov
- Minuartia tchihatchewii (Boiss.) Hand.-Mazz.
- Minuartia tenuissima (Pomel) Mattf.
- Minuartia torosensis Koç & Hamzaoğlu
- Minuartia tricostata A.P.Khokhr.
- Minuartia turcica Koç
- Minuartia valedictionis McNeill
- Minuartia woronowii Schischk.

=== Formerly placed here ===
- Cherleria arctica (Steven ex Ser.) A.J.Moore & Dillenb. – Arctic sandwort (as Minuartia arctica (Steven ex Ser.) Graebn.)
- Cherleria biflora (L.) A.J.Moore & Dillenb. – mountain sandwort (as Minuartia biflora (L.) Schinz & Thell.)
- Cherleria dirphya (Trigas & Iatroú) A.J.Moore & Dillenb. (as Minuartia dirphya Trigas & Iatroú)
- Cherleria laricifolia (L.) Iamonico (as Minuartia laricifolia (L.) Schinz & Thell.)
- Cherleria marcescens (Fernald) A.J.Moore & Dillenb. – serpentine sandwort (as Minuartia marcescens (Fernald) House)
- Cherleria obtusiloba (Rydb.) A.J.Moore & Dillenb. – twinflower sandwort (as Minuartia obtusiloba (Rydb.) House)
- Cherleria sedoides L. (as Minuartia sedoides (L.) Hiern)
- Cherleria yukonensis (Hultén) A.J.Moore & Dillenb. – Yukon sandwort (as Minuartia yukonensis Hultén)
- Facchinia cherlerioides (Sieber) Dillenb. & Kadereit (as Minuartia cherlerioides (Sieber) Bech.)
- Geocarpon carolinianum (Walter) E.E.Schill. – pinebarren sandwort (as Minuartia caroliniana (Walter) Mattf.)
- Geocarpon cumberlandense (Wofford & R.Kral) E.E.Schill. – Cumberland sandwort (as Minuartia cumberlandensis (Wofford & R.Kral) McNeill)
- Geocarpon glabrum (Michx.) E.E.Schill. – Appalachian sandwort (as Minuartia glabra (Michx.) Mattf.)
- Geocarpon groenlandicum (Retz.) E.E.Schill. – Greenland stitchwort, mountain sandwort (as Minuartia groenlandica (Retz.) Ostenf.)
- Geocarpon nuttallii (Torr. & A.Gray) E.E.Schill. – Drummond's sandwort (as Minuartia nuttallii (Torr. & A.Gray) Mattf. and M. drummondii (Shinners) McNeill)
- Geocarpon uniflorum (Walter) E.E.Schill. (as Minuartia uniflora (Walter) Mattf.)
- Mcneillia graminifolia (Ard.) Dillenb. & Kadereit (as Minuartia graminifolia (Ard.) Jáv.)
- Pseudocherleria macrocarpa (Pursh) Dillenb. & Kadereit – longpod sandwort (as Minuartia macrocarpa (Pursh) Ostenf.)
- Sabulina austromontana (S.J.Wolf & Packer) Dillenb. & Kadereit – Columbian sandwort (as Minuartia austromontana S.J.Wolf & Packer)
- Sabulina californica (A.Gray) Dillenb. & Kadereit – California sandwort (as Minuartia californica (A.Gray) Mattf.)
- Sabulina cismontana (Meinke & Zika) Dillenb. & Kadereit (as Minuartia cismontana Meinke & Zika)
- Sabulina dawsonensis (Britton) Rydb. – rock sandwort (as Minuartia dawsonensis (Britton) House)
- Sabulina decumbens (T.W.Nelson & J.P.Nelson) Dillenb. & Kadereit – Lassicus sandwort (as Minuartia decumbens T.W.Nelson & J.P.Nelson)
- Sabulina douglasii (Fenzl ex Torr. & A.Gray) Dillenb. & Kadereit – Douglas' sandwort (as Minuartia douglasii (Fenzl ex Torr. & A.Gray) Mattf.)
- Sabulina elegans (Cham. & Schltdl.) Dillenb. & Kadereit (as Minuartia elegans (Cham. & Schltdl.) Schischk.)
- Sabulina howellii (S.Watson) Dillenb. & Kadereit – Howell's sandwort (as Minuartia howellii (S.Watson) Mattf.)
- Sabulina juniperina (L.) Dillenb. & Kadereit (as Minuartia juniperina (L.) Maire & Petitm.
- Sabulina macra (A.Nelson & J.F.Macbr.) Dillenb. & Kadereit – slender sandwort (as Minuartia tenella (J.Gay) Mattf.)
- Sabulina macrantha (Rydb.) Dillenb. & Kadereit – House's sandwort or threadbranch sandwort (as M. macrantha (Rydb.) House and M. filiorum (Maguire) McNeill)
- Sabulina michauxii (Fenzl) Dillenb. & Kadereit – rock sandwort (as Minuartia michauxii (Fenzl) Farw.)
- Sabulina muscorum (Fassett) E.E.Schill. – Dixie sandwort (as Minuartia muscorum (Fassett) Rabeler)
- Sabulina nuttallii (Pax) Dillenb. & Kadereit – Nuttall's sandwort (as Minuartia nuttallii (Pax) Briq.)
- Sabulina paludicola (Fernald & B.G.Schub.) E.E.Schill. – Godfrey's sandwort (as Minuartia godfreyi (Shinners) McNeill)
- Sabulina patula (Michx.) Small ex Rydb. – pitcher's sandwort (as Minuartia patula (Michx.) Mattf.)
- Sabulina pusilla (S.Watson) Dillenb. & Kadereit – annual sandwort (as Minuartia pusilla (S.Watson) Mattf.)
- Sabulina rosei (Maguire & Barneby) Dillenb. & Kadereit – peanut sandwort (as Minuartia rosei (Maguire & Barneby) McNeill)
- Sabulina rossii (R.Br. ex Richardson) Dillenb. & Kadereit – Ross' sandwort (as Minuartia rossii (R.Br. ex Richardson) Graebn.)
- Sabulina rubella (Wahlenb.) Dillenb. & Kadereit (as Minuartia rubella (Wahlenb.) Hiern)
- Sabulina stolonifera (T.W.Nelson & J.P.Nelson) Dillenb. & Kadereit (as Minuartia stolonifera T.W.Nelson & J.P.Nelson)
- Sabulina stricta (Sw.) Rchb. – bog sandwort (as Minuartia stricta (Sw.) Hiern)
- Sabulina verna (L.) Rchb. – spring sandwort (as Minuartia verna (L.) Hiern)
- Sabulina viscosa (Schreb.) Rchb. (as Minuartia viscosa (Schreb.) Schinz & Thell.)
