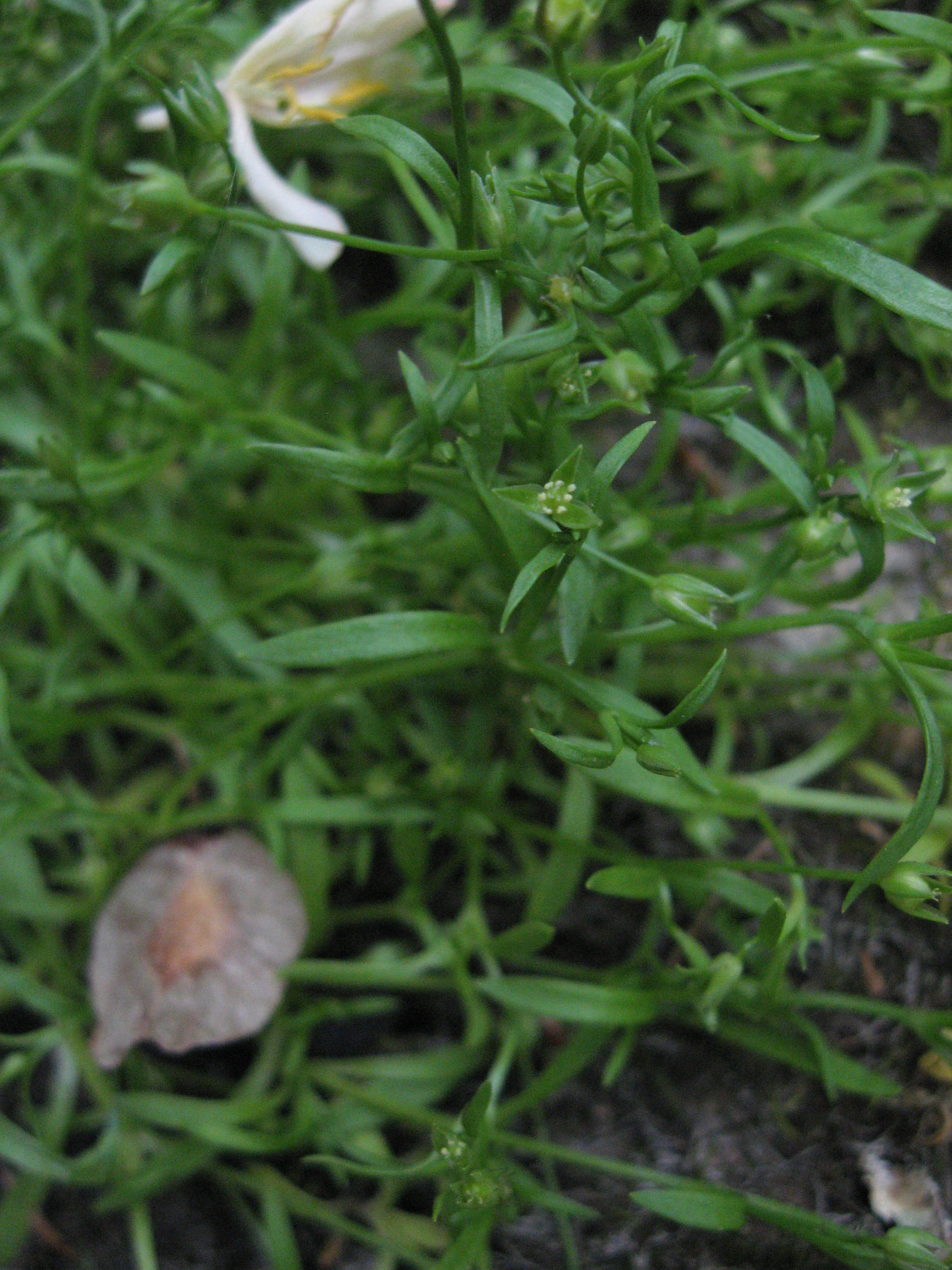

Conservation status
- Vulnerable (NatureServe)

Scientific classification
- Kingdom: Plantae
- Clade: Tracheophytes
- Clade: Angiosperms
- Clade: Eudicots
- Order: Caryophyllales
- Family: Caryophyllaceae
- Genus: Sabulina
- Species: S. fontinalis

Binomial name
- Sabulina fontinalis (Short & R.Peter) Dillenb. & Kadereit (2014)

Synonyms
- List: Alsine fontinalis (Short & R.Peter) Britton (1894); Arenaria fontinalis (Short & R.Peter) Shinners (1962); Sagina fontinalis Short & R.Peter (1836); Stellaria fontinalis (Short and R.Peter) B.L.Rob. (1894)

= Sabulina fontinalis =

Species of flowering plant

Sabulina fontinalis, commonly called American water starwort or Kentucky starwort, is a flowering plant in the family Caryophyllaceae. It is a very rare species, endemic to the Nashville Basin of Tennessee, the Kentucky River Pallisades of Kentucky, and in northern Alabama. It is found in wet limestone areas, often on cliffs or ledges where water seeps over the rocks.

Line drawing

Sabulina fontinalis is a winter annual forming dense colonies, which produce very small green flowers in the spring. It has been taxonomically difficult to place, sometimes being included in the genera Stellaria, Sagina, Minuartia, or Arenaria among others. The most recent phylogenetic analysis suggests that it is best placed in the genus Sabulina.
