= Alsine =

Alsine may refer to:

- Alsine Linnaeus, 1753, a genus of plants in the family Caryophyllaceae, synonym of Stellaria
- Alsine Gaertn., a genus of plants in the family Caryophyllaceae, synonym of Minuartia
- Alsine, a Dean of Canterbury, incumbent in 935
