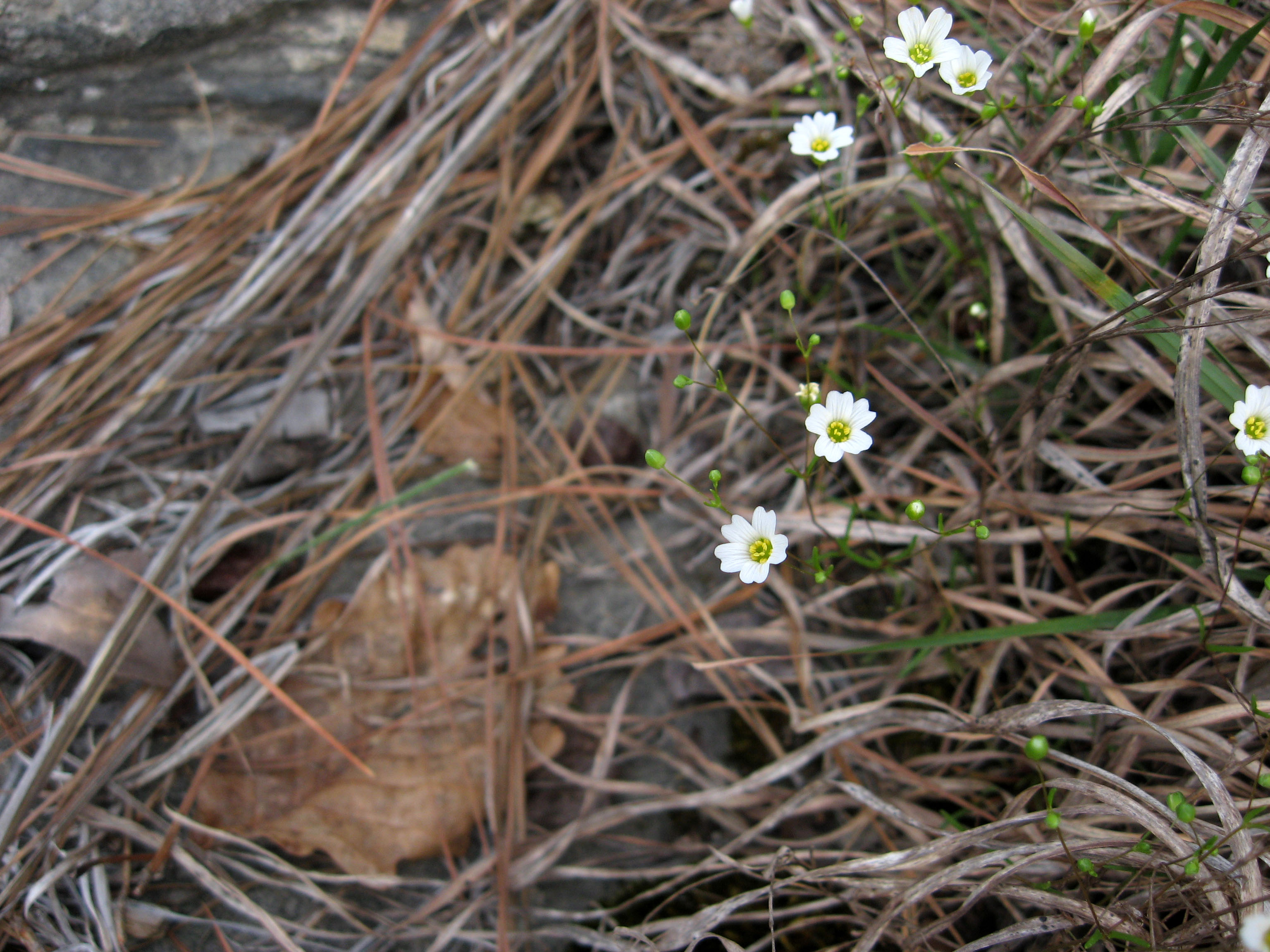

Scientific classification
- Kingdom: Plantae
- Clade: Tracheophytes
- Clade: Angiosperms
- Clade: Eudicots
- Order: Caryophyllales
- Family: Caryophyllaceae
- Genus: Geocarpon
- Species: G. uniflorum

Binomial name
- Geocarpon uniflorum (Walter) E.E.Schill. (2022)

Synonyms
- Alsine brevifolia (Nutt.) Chapm.(1860), nom. illeg.; Alsine uniflora A.Heller (1898); Alsinopsis brevifolia (Nutt.) Small (1903); Alsinopsis uniflora (Walter) Small (1903); Arenaria alabamensis (J.F.McCormick, Bozeman & Spongberg) R.E.Wyatt (1977); Arenaria brevifolia Nutt. (1838); Arenaria glabra Elliott (1821), nom. illeg.; Arenaria uniflora (Walter) Muhl. (1813), nom. illeg.; Minuartia alabamensis J.F.McCormick, Bozeman & Spongberg (1971); Minuartia brevifolia (Nutt.) Mattf. (1921); Minuartia uniflora (Walter) Mattf. (1921); Mononeuria uniflora (Walter) Dillenb. & Kadereit (2014); Sabularia brevifolia (Nutt.) Small (1933); Sabularia uniflora (Walter) Small (1933); Sabulina brevifolia (Nutt.) Small (1933); Sabulina uniflora (Walter) Small (1933); Stellaria uniflora Walter) (1788) – basionym

= Geocarpon uniflorum =

Species of flowering plant

Geocarpon uniflorum, the one-flower stitchwort, is a species of flowering plant in the family Caryophyllaceae. It is native to the Southeastern United States where it is primarily found in the Piedmont. Its preferred habitat is sandy or granitic rock outcrops.

The plants formerly referred to as Minuartia alabamensis have been shown to be a self-pollinating form of Geocarpon uniflorum that has arisen independently at various locations, and it is thus included under this species. Genetic evidence suggested that this species is best placed in the genus Mononeuria, although that classification was not widely adopted. In 2022 it was placed in genus Geocarpon.

This species is distinguished from the similar Geocarpon glabrum by having shorter leaves and petals that are not clawed.
