= Sabulina cismontana =

Conservation status
- Vulnerable (NatureServe)

Scientific classification
- Kingdom: Plantae
- Clade: Tracheophytes
- Clade: Angiosperms
- Clade: Eudicots
- Order: Caryophyllales
- Family: Caryophyllaceae
- Genus: Sabulina
- Species: S. cismontana

Binomial name
- Sabulina cismontana (Meinke & Zika) Dillenb. & Kadereit (2014)

Synonyms
- Minuartia cismontana Meinke & Zika (1992)

Species of flowering plant

Sabulina cismontana is a species of flowering plant in the family Caryophyllaceae known by the common name cismontane minuartia.

It is native to Oregon and northern and central California, where it occurs in woodland and chaparral habitat, often on serpentine soils. It is similar to Sabulina californica and S. pusilla, but it was found to be a different species and was described as new in 1992.

== Description ==
Sabulina cismontana is an ephemeral annual herb producing a stiff, erect, green or reddish purple stem up to about 25 centimeters tall from a thin taproot.

The small, sparse leaves are up to a centimeter long and not more than 1 or 2 millimeters wide. They are green or reddish purple in color, shiny and hairless.

The inflorescence contains up to 20 flowers with white petals, each on a thin branch.
