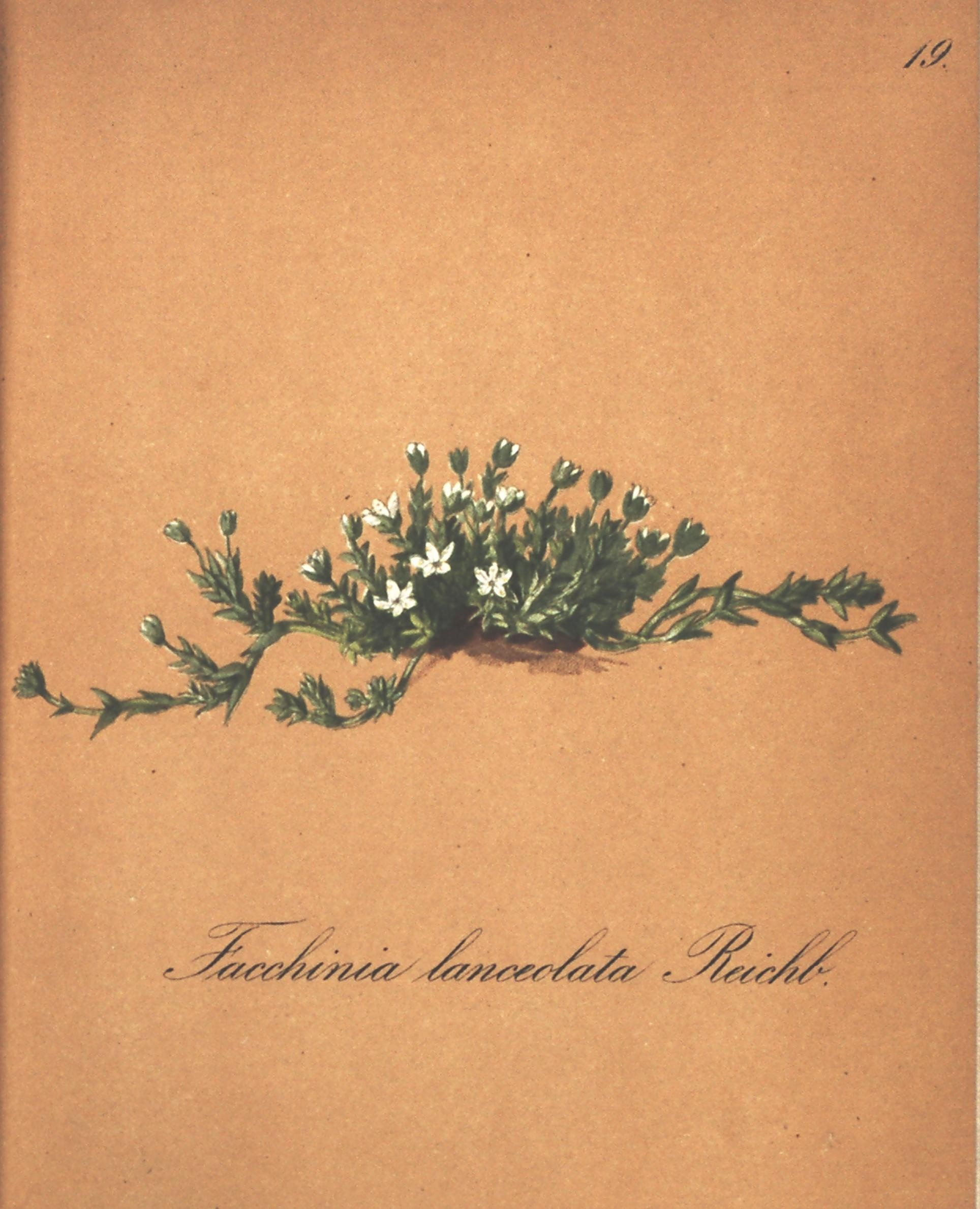
- Facchinia lanceolata botanical illustration

Scientific classification
- Kingdom: Plantae
- Clade: Tracheophytes
- Clade: Angiosperms
- Clade: Eudicots
- Order: Caryophyllales
- Family: Caryophyllaceae
- Tribe: Sagineae
- Genus: Facchinia; Rchb. (1841)

Species
- See text

Synonyms
- Assoella J.M.Monts. (1986); Dufourea Gren. (1837), nom. illeg.; Schmidtia Sieber (1813), nom. illeg.; Siebera Hoppe (1819), nom. rej.; Somerauera Hoppe (1819)

= Facchinia =

Genus of plants in the carnation family

Facchinia is a genus of flowering plants in the pink and carnation family Caryophyllaceae, native to the Pyrenees and the Alps. Many species in this genus were previously placed in Minuartia.

== Species ==
There are seven species and one subspecies in Facchinia:

- Facchinia cerastiifolia (Ramond ex DC.) Dillenb. & Kadereit
- Facchinia cherlerioides (Sieber) Dillenb. & Kadereit
  - F. cherlerioides subsp. aretioides (Port. ex J.Gay) Dillenb. & Kadereit
- Facchinia grignensis (Rchb.) Dillenb. & Kadereit
- Facchinia herniarioides (Rion) Dillenb. & Kadereit
- Facchinia lanceolata (All.) Rchb.
- Facchinia rupestris (Scop.) Dillenb. & Kadereit
- Facchinia valentina (Pau) Dillenb. & Kadereit
