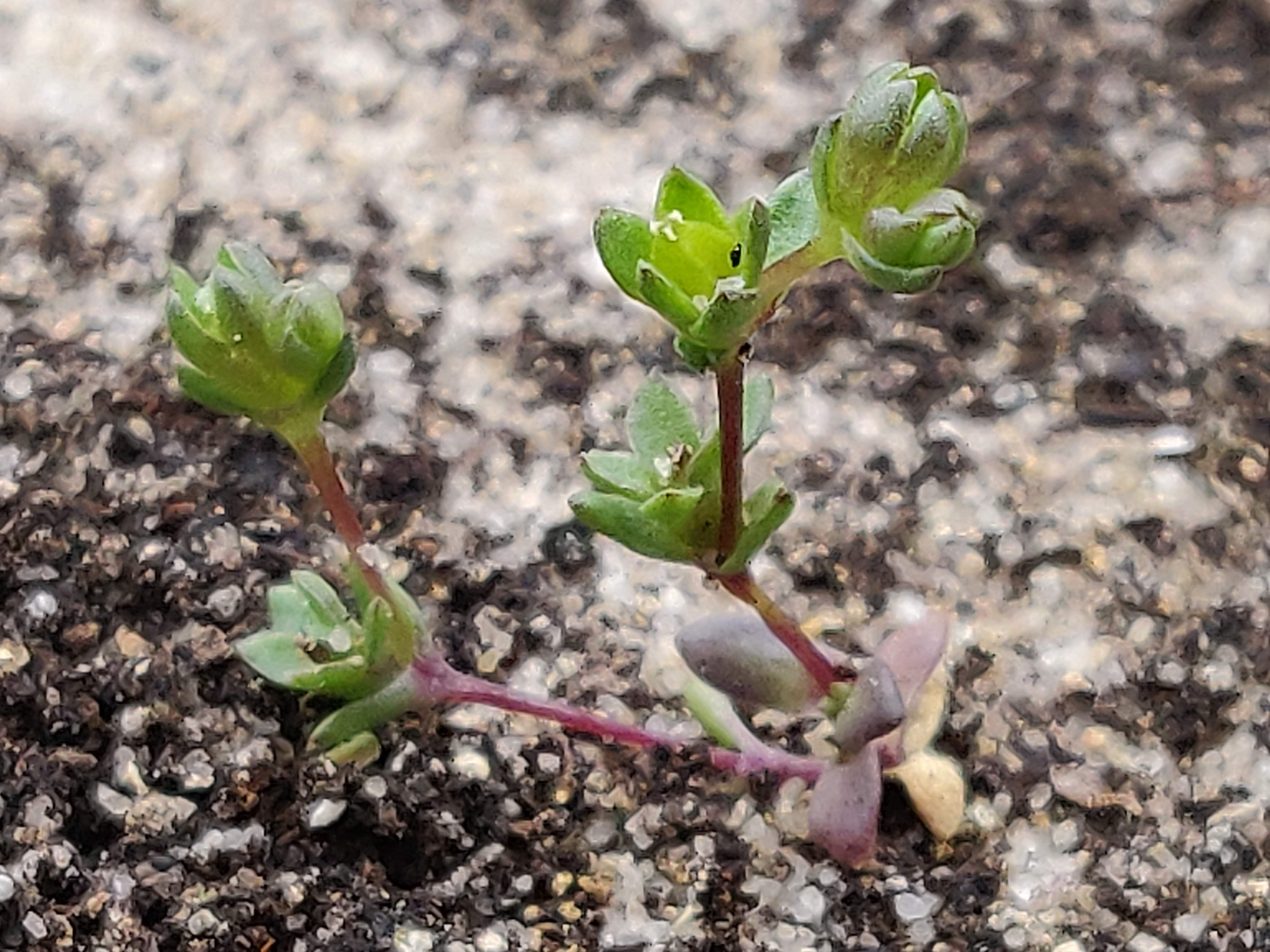

Conservation status
- Imperiled (NatureServe)

Scientific classification
- Kingdom: Plantae
- Clade: Tracheophytes
- Clade: Angiosperms
- Clade: Eudicots
- Order: Caryophyllales
- Family: Caryophyllaceae
- Genus: Geocarpon
- Species: G. minimum

Binomial name
- Geocarpon minimum Mack. (1914)

Synonyms
- Mononeuria minima (Mack.) Dillenb. & Kadereit (2014)

= Geocarpon minimum =

Genus of flowering plants

Geocarpon minimum is a species of flowering plant in the carnation family (Caryophyllaceae) which is known by the common names tinytim and earth-fruit. It is a rare plant known from about 34 populations in the US states of Arkansas, Louisiana, Missouri, Texas, and Oklahoma. There are a number of threats to its survival and it was listed as a threatened species of the United States in 1987.

Most of the populations are located in Missouri, with a few more in nearby states. It was discovered in Anderson County, Texas, in 2004. The plant was probably widespread on the North American continent long ago, but the climate changed, and it now exists as a relict species in a narrow strip of hospitable habitat. It grows on sandstone glades and outcrops as well as bare, sparsely vegetated areas where the soil contains relatively large amounts of magnesium and sodium salts. It can be found on "slicks" with a coating of lichens and Nostoc cyanobacteria that are very wet after winter rain and then dry into a hard crust. Lichens of genus Xanthoparmelia occur on the slicks. Few flowering plants grow in this harsh habitat. It is an ephemeral species, sprouting up and generally undergoing its full life cycle within four weeks around February and March, or as late as June in some areas. The yearly abundance of this tiny annual plant in a particular area depends on the amount of recent rainfall there; populations are small or nonexistent in dry years and can contain thousands of plants in a wet season.

Geocarpon minimum is a petite succulent plant measuring no more than 4 centimeters (1.6 inches) tall with a hair-thin stem. The plant is grayish, brownish, or green when new and then turns magenta, red, bright pink, or purplish as it matures. The red color is from anthocyanins. It has tiny leaves 3 or 4 millimeters long and a red or purplish inflorescence containing one flower no more than 4 millimeters long.

Geocarpon minimum requires a specific type of habitat. The slicks and saline prairies it inhabits have become uncommon as the soil has changed. As the substrate has become more suitable for other types of flowering plants, the tinytim is easily outcompeted. What causes this change in the soils is not clear. They probably require some sort of disturbance, such as fire, to stay bare, eroded, and salty. However, too much disturbance can destroy this type of habitat. For example, cattle grazing tends to alter the soil in such a way that plants can take hold, turning bare patches to prairie, but there is also evidence that intensive grazing can keep larger plants down and allow the tinytim to spring up. Off-road vehicles have been noted to destroy habitat, but the type of disturbance they create may also be helpful in keeping the soil barren. More research may help clarify the ecological relationships of the plant.

Although the tinytim is still quite limited in range and minor threats still exist, it has a "high recovery potential" and is almost ready to be removed from the endangered species list. Since it was listed, more populations have been discovered and a few have been planted in appropriate habitat. However, the populations require more monitoring to make sure they can survive and research should be done to establish the genetic variability of the species across its range.

There has been some disagreement over which family this genus should be assigned to. Mackenzie in his initial description placed it in the Aizoaceae but most present-day taxonomists regard it as part of the Caryophyllaceae.
