= Minuartia sintenisii =

Scientific classification
- Kingdom: Plantae
- Clade: Tracheophytes
- Clade: Angiosperms
- Clade: Eudicots
- Order: Caryophyllales
- Family: Caryophyllaceae
- Genus: Minuartia
- Species: M. sintenisii

Binomial name
- Minuartia sintenisii (H.Lindb.) Rech.f.

Species of flowering plant

Minuartia sintenisii, common name Troodos sandwort, is a dwarf annual, with few erect stems. Leaves linear-subulate, opposite. Sepals with a very narrow-hyaline margin. Petals up to 12 mm long, white, entire or slightly emarginate.

== Distribution ==
It is an endemic of the summits of the Troodos Mountains in Cyprus. Flowers from April to June.
