= Sabulina mediterranea =

Scientific classification
- Kingdom: Plantae
- Clade: Tracheophytes
- Clade: Angiosperms
- Clade: Eudicots
- Order: Caryophyllales
- Family: Caryophyllaceae
- Genus: Sabulina
- Species: S. mediterranea

Binomial name
- Sabulina mediterranea (Ledeb. ex Link) Rchb. (1841)

Synonyms
- Synonymy: Alsine arvatica Guss. (1843); Alsine conferta Jord. (1852); Alsine confertiflora (Fenzl) Rouy & Foucaud (1896); Alsine mediterranea (Ledeb. ex Link) Gren. (1859); Alsine mucronata subsp. conferta (Jord.) Nyman (1878); Alsine subulifolia Guss. (1843); Alsine tenuifolia var. arvatica (Guss.) Caldesi (1879); Alsine tenuifolia proles arvatica (C.Presl) Rouy & Foucaud (1896); Alsine tenuifolia proles conferta (Jord.) Rouy & Foucaud (1896); Alsine tenuifolia subsp. conferta (Jord.) Thell. (1912); Alsine tenuifolia proles confertiflora (Fenzl) Rouy & Foucaud (1896); Alsine tenuifolia subsp. confertiflora (Fenzl) Murb. (1897); Alsine tenuifolia var. confertiflora Fenzl (1842); Alsine tenuifolia var. densiflora Vis. (1852); Alsine tenuifolia var. dunensis Corb. (1894); Alsine tenuifolia var. mucronata Boiss. (1867); Alsine verna var. mediterranea (Ledeb. ex Link) Fenzl (1841); Arenaria arvatica C.Presl (1826); Arenaria mediterranea Ledeb. ex Link (1821) – basionym; Arenaria mucronata Sm. (1821), nom. illeg.; Arenaria subulifolia C.Presl (1826); Arenaria triandra Schrank (1819); Minuartia densiflora (Vis.) Fritsch (1909); Minuartia hybrida subsp. conferta (Jord.) O.Bolòs & Vigo (1990); Minuartia hybrida subsp. mediterranea (Ledeb. ex Link) O.Bolòs & Vigo (1974); Minuartia leptophylla J.Groves (1904); Minuartia mediterranea (Ledeb. ex Link) K.Malý (1908); Minuartia mediterranea var. confertiflora (Fenzl) Molero (1975); Minuartia mediterranea var. densiflora (Vis.) K.Malý (1908); Minuartia tenuifolia Nees ex Mart. (1814); Minuartia tenuifolia var. arvatica (C.Presl) Maire (1932); Minuartia tenuifolia subsp. conferta (Jord.) Thell. (1912); Minuartia tenuifolia subsp. confertiflora (Fenzl) Briq. (1910); Minuartia tenuifolia var. confertiflora (Fenzl) Briq. (1910); Minuartia tenuifolia var. densiflora (Vis.) Cout. (1935); Minuartia tenuifolia var. mediterranea (Ledeb. ex Link) P.Fourn. (1936); Minuartia tenuifolia subsp. mediterranea (Ledeb. ex Link) Briq. (1910); Minuartia viscosa subsp. confertiflora (Fenzl) Breistr. (1947)

Species of plant

Sabulina mediterranea is a species of flowering plant in the family Caryophyllaceae (carpetweeds). It is an annual native to the Mediterranean Basin region, including parts of southern Europe (Albania, Balearic Islands, Bulgaria, Corsica, East Aegean Islands, France, Greece, Italy, Crete, Portugal, Sicily, Spain, European Turkey, and former Yugoslavia), north Africa (Algeria, Egypt, Libya, Morocco, and Tunisia) and western Asia (Cyprus, Israel and Palestine, and Turkey).

== Sources ==
This article incorporates text from a free content work. Licensed under CC0 (license statement/permission). Text taken from Minuartia mediterranea. Encyclopedia of Life.
