= Sandwort =

Sandwort is the common name of several flowering plants in the carnation family, which may be members of the following genera:

- Arenaria
- Minuartia
- Moehringia

== See also ==
- Wort plants
