= Minuartia krascheninnikovii =

Scientific classification
- Kingdom: Plantae
- Clade: Embryophytes
- Clade: Tracheophytes
- Clade: Spermatophytes
- Clade: Angiosperms
- Clade: Eudicots
- Order: Caryophyllales
- Family: Caryophyllaceae
- Genus: Minuartia
- Species: M. krascheninnikovii

Binomial name
- Minuartia krascheninnikovii Schischk.

Species of flowering plant

Minuartia krascheninnikovii is a species of flowering plant in the sandwort genus Minuartia, family Caryophyllaceae, native to East European Russia. It is found in the petrophytic steppes of the southern Ural Mountains.
