= Geocarpon =

Scientific classification
- Kingdom: Plantae
- Clade: Tracheophytes
- Clade: Angiosperms
- Clade: Eudicots
- Order: Caryophyllales
- Family: Caryophyllaceae
- Genus: Geocarpon; Mack. (1914)

Species
- Seven; see text

Genus of flowering plants

Geocarpon is a genus of flowering plants in the carnation family, Caryophyllaceae. It includes seven species native to North America, from the eastern subarctic (including Greenland) through the eastern, southeastern, and central United States.

== Species ==
Seven species are accepted.

- Geocarpon carolinianum (Walter) E.E.Schill.
- Geocarpon cumberlandense (Wofford & R.Kral) E.E.Schill.
- Geocarpon glabrum (Michx.) E.E.Schill.
- Geocarpon groenlandicum (Retz.) E.E.Schill.
- Geocarpon minimum Mack.
- Geocarpon nuttallii (Torr. & A.Gray) E.E.Schill.
- Geocarpon uniflorum (Walter) E.E.Schill.
