= Geocarpon cumberlandense =

Scientific classification
- Kingdom: Plantae
- Clade: Tracheophytes
- Clade: Angiosperms
- Clade: Eudicots
- Order: Caryophyllales
- Family: Caryophyllaceae
- Genus: Geocarpon
- Species: G. cumberlandense

Binomial name
- Geocarpon cumberlandense (B.E.Wofford & Kral) E.E.Schill. (2022)

Synonyms
- Arenaria cumberlandensis Wofford & R.Kral (1979); Minuartia cumberlandensis (Wofford & R.Kral) McNeill (1980); Mononeuria cumberlandensis (Wofford & R.Kral) Dillenb. & Kadereit (2014)

Species of flowering plant

Geocarpon cumberlandense is a rare species of flowering plant in the pink family known by the common names Cumberland stitchwort and Cumberland sandwort. It is endemic to the Cumberland Plateau near the Big South Fork of the Cumberland River in Tennessee and Kentucky. This rare plant is found only in cool sandstone rock shelters, on the moist sandy cave floors behind the drip line. There are 27 occurrences in Tennessee and one in Kentucky. The plant is a federally listed endangered species.

This is a petite perennial herb forming tufts of stems from threadlike taproots. The green stems reach 15 to 20 centimeters in maximum height. The leaves have shiny green linear or lance-shaped blades up to 3 or 4 centimeters long. The inflorescence is a solitary flower or a cluster of up to three flowers. Each has white petals no more than 6 millimeters long. Flowers bloom in the summer.

Threats to this species include damage to its habitat, which may occur during recreational use such as camping and rappelling, or during logging. The rock shelter habitat of the plant is cool, humid, and dark; removal of surrounding trees lets light in and makes it warmer and drier.

The plant was first described to science in 1979 as Arenaria cumberlandensis when specimens once thought to be Geocarpon groenlandicum did not fit its description, or that of any known species. It was renamed Geocarpon cumberlandense in 2022.

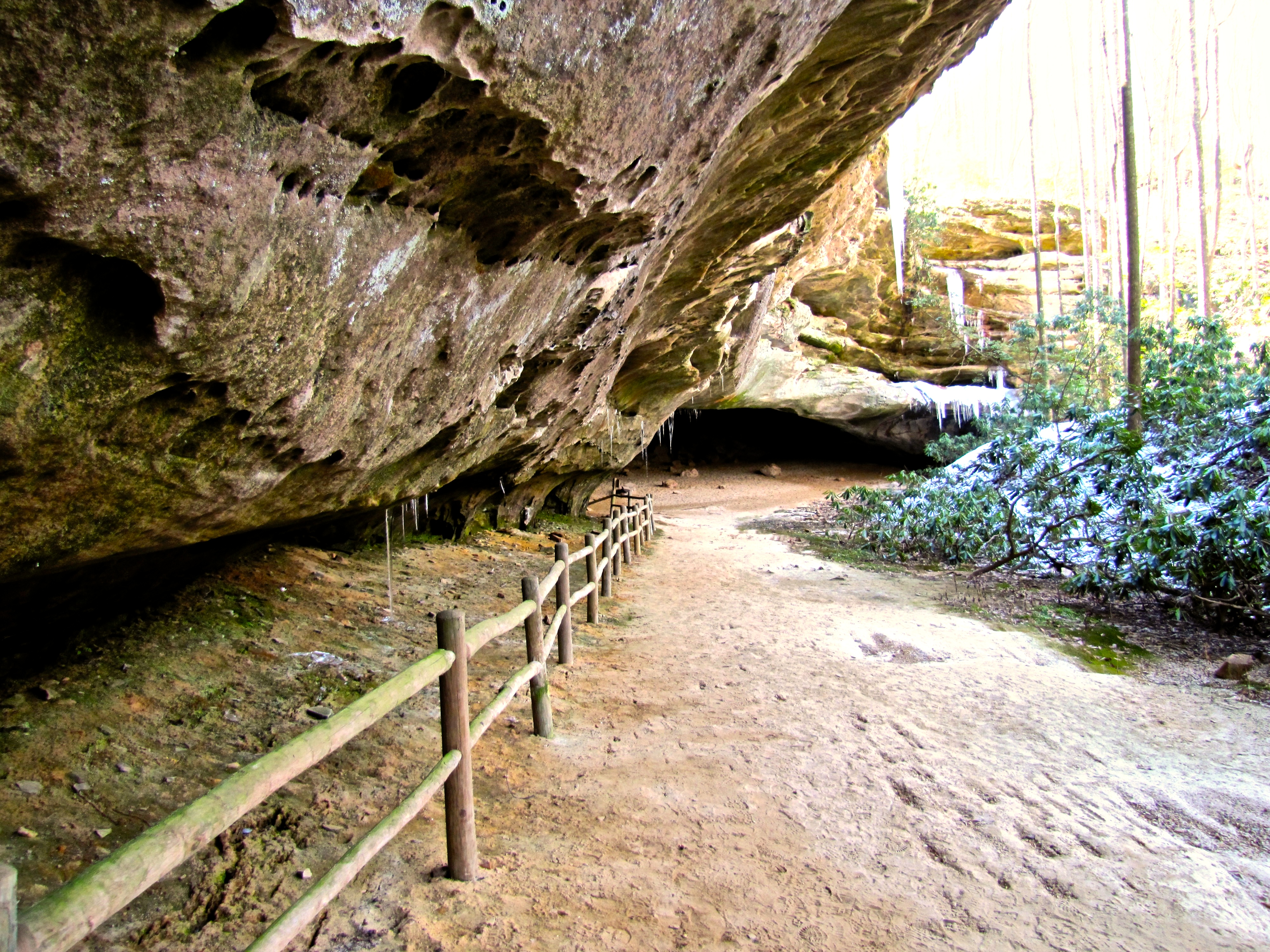
A fence installed at Pickett State Park to protect the stitchwort
