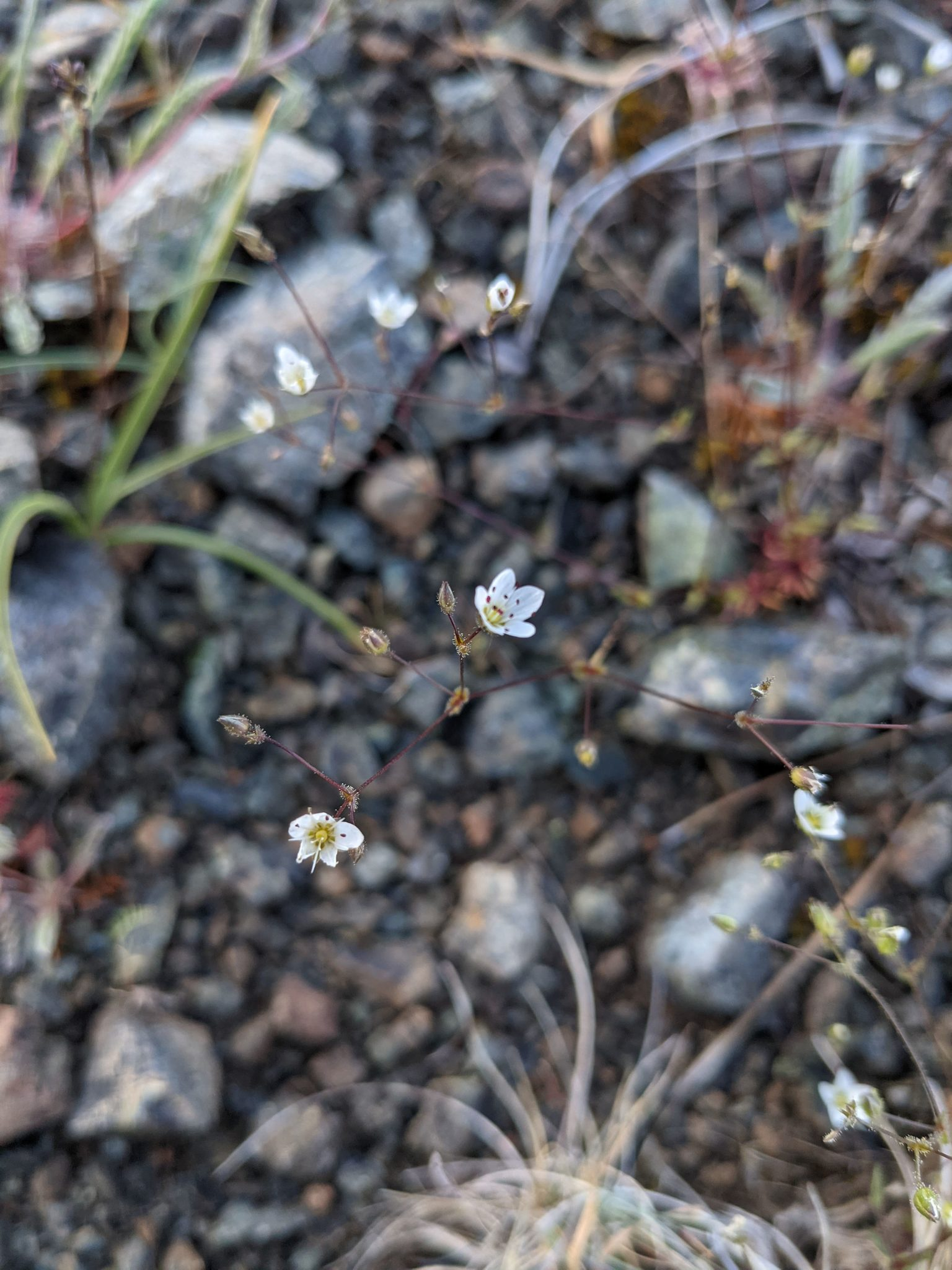

Conservation status
- Apparently Secure (NatureServe)

Scientific classification
- Kingdom: Plantae
- Clade: Tracheophytes
- Clade: Angiosperms
- Clade: Eudicots
- Order: Caryophyllales
- Family: Caryophyllaceae
- Genus: Sabulina
- Species: S. howellii

Binomial name
- Sabulina howellii (S.Watson) Dillenb. & Kadereit (2014)

Synonyms
- Alsinopsis howellii (S.Watson) A.Heller (1912); Arenaria howellii S.Watson (1885); Minuartia howellii (S.Watson) Mattf. (1921)

= Sabulina howellii =

Species of flowering plant

Sabulina howellii is an uncommon species of flowering plant in the family Caryophyllaceae known by the common names Howell's stitchwort and Howell's sandwort.

It is native to the Klamath Mountains of northwestern California and southwestern Oregon. It grows in serpentine soils in chaparral and woodland habitat.

== Description ==
Sabulina howellii is a slightly hairy annual herb growing to a maximum height of 30 centimeters with a slender green stem which turns purple with age.

The thin, rigid, almost needlelike leaves are linear or narrowly lance-shaped, up to 1.5 centimeters long and under 2 millimeters wide.

The tiny flower has five white petals each a few millimeters long and smaller, ribbed sepals.
