= Sabulina decumbens =

Conservation status
- Critically Imperiled (NatureServe)

Scientific classification
- Kingdom: Plantae
- Clade: Tracheophytes
- Clade: Angiosperms
- Clade: Eudicots
- Order: Caryophyllales
- Family: Caryophyllaceae
- Genus: Sabulina
- Species: S. decumbens

Binomial name
- Sabulina decumbens (T.W.Nelson & J.P.Nelson) Dillenb. & Kadereit (2014)

Synonyms
- Minuartia decumbens T.W.Nelson & J.P.Nelson (1981)

Species of flowering plant

Sabulina decumbens is a rare species of flowering plant in the family Caryophyllaceae known by the common names The Lassics sandwort and Lassicus stitchwort.

The species was described in 1981 from the type specimen observed on Mule Ridge in a string of peaks known as The Lassics.

== Description ==
Sabulina decumbens is a low, mat-forming perennial herb growing a in a clump a few centimeters high from a thin, woody taproot. The narrow, rigid, sometimes needle-like leaves are under a centimeter long and no more than 2 millimeters wide.

The tiny flowers have purple-tipped sepals a few millimeters long and five white petals which are slightly smaller.

== Distribution ==
It is endemic to California, where it is known from only a single occurrence in the isolated inland mountains of the North Coast Ranges in Trinity County near the Humboldt County line. It grows in the serpentine soils of the mountain forests among Jeffrey Pines.
