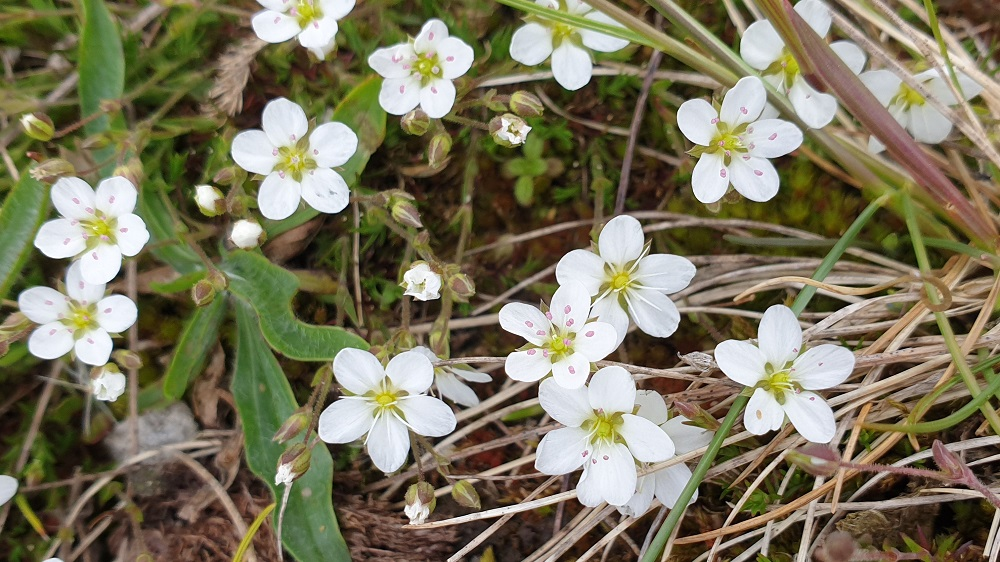

Scientific classification
- Kingdom: Plantae
- Clade: Tracheophytes
- Clade: Angiosperms
- Clade: Eudicots
- Order: Caryophyllales
- Family: Caryophyllaceae
- Genus: Sabulina
- Species: S. verna

Binomial name
- Sabulina verna (L.) Rchb. (1832)

Subspecies
- Sabulina verna subsp. brevipetala (Hartvig & Å.Strid) Dillenb. & Kadereit; Sabulina verna subsp. grandiflora (C.Presl) Dillenb. & Kadereit; Sabulina verna subsp. hercynica (Willk.) Dillenb. & Kadereit; Sabulina verna subsp. kabylica (Pomel) Dillenb. & Kadereit; Sabulina verna subsp. verna

Synonyms
- Alsine verna (L.) Wahlenb. (1812); Alsine verna var. montana Fenzl (1841), not validly publ.; Arenaria verna L. (1767); Cherleria verna (L.) Samp. (1913); Minuartia verna (L.) Hiern (1899); Tryphane verna (L.) Rchb. (1841)

= Sabulina verna =

Species of plant

Sabulina verna is a scarce species of flowering plant in the family Caryophyllaceae, known by the common names spring sandwort, leadwort, golden moss, or Irish moss. It is a small mat-forming, perennial herb. It was first described as Arenaria verna by Carl Linnaeus in 1767 and is known by several synonyms including Minuartia verna.

The small (7–9 mm across), 5-petalled flowers appear on short, downy stems from spring until late summer. The slender leaves have 3 veins.

It ranges across temperate Eurasia and northwestern Africa with a boreal-montane distribution. It is typically found on carboniferous limestone ground. It grows in short grassland, on exposed limestone pavement, on scree slopes and on metal-rich soils, including spoil heaps from lead mining.

== Subspecies ==
Five subspecies are accepted.

- Sabulina verna subsp. brevipetala (Hartvig & Å.Strid) Dillenb. & Kadereit – Turkey
- Sabulina verna subsp. grandiflora (C.Presl) Dillenb. & Kadereit – Sardinia and Sicily
- Sabulina verna subsp. hercynica (Willk.) Dillenb. & Kadereit – Belgium, France, and Germany
- Sabulina verna subsp. kabylica (Pomel) Dillenb. & Kadereit – northwestern Africa (Morocco and Algeria)
- Sabulina verna subsp. verna – Europe, Turkey and the Caucasus, Siberia, Central Asia, Xinjiang, Mongolia, Japan, and the eastern Himalayas.
