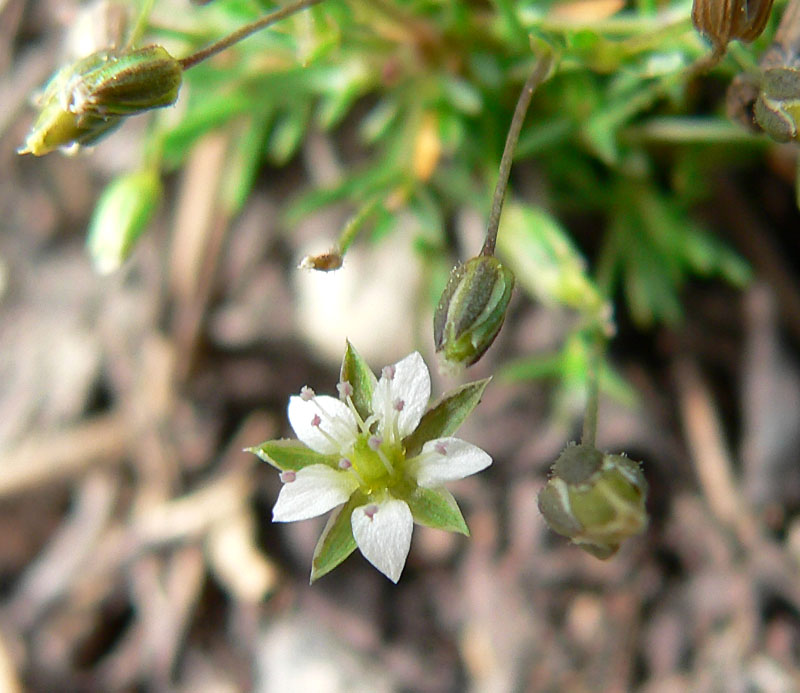

Scientific classification
- Kingdom: Plantae
- Clade: Tracheophytes
- Clade: Angiosperms
- Clade: Eudicots
- Order: Caryophyllales
- Family: Caryophyllaceae
- Genus: Sabulina
- Species: S. rubella

Binomial name
- Sabulina rubella (Wahlenb.) Dillenb. & Kadereit (2014)

Synonyms
- Synonymy: Alsine hirta var. rubella (Wahlenb.) C.Hartm. (1854); Alsine rubella Wahlenb. (1812) (basionym); Alsine rubella f. glaberrima Montell (1935); Alsine verna var. glacialis Fenzl (1842); Alsine verna var. propinqua (Richardson) Lange (1880); Alsinella rubella (Wahlenb.) Sw. (1814); Alsinopsis propinqua (Richardson) Rydb. (1906); Alsinopsis quadrivalvis (R.Br.) Rydb. (1906); Arenaria aequicaulis (A.Nelson) A.Nelson (1909); Arenaria cheirifolia G.Don (1830); Arenaria cherlerifolia G.Don (1830); Arenaria hirta var. glabrata Cham. & Schltdl. (1826); Arenaria propinqua Richardson in Bot. App., ed. 2: 17 (1823); Arenaria quadrivalvis R.Br. (1823); Arenaria rubella (Wahlenb.) Sm. (1814); Arenaria rubella f. epilis (Fernald) Polunin (1939); Arenaria sulcata Willd. ex D.F.K.Schltdl. (1816); Arenaria verna var. aequicaulis A.Nelson (1899); Arenaria verna f. epilis Fernald (1919); Arenaria verna var. propinqua (Richardson) Fernald (1906); Arenaria verna var. rubella (Wahlenb.) Britton ex Hook.f. (1860), nom. superfl.; Minuartia propinqua (Richardson) House (1921); Minuartia quadrivalvis (R.Br.) House (1921); Minuartia rubella (Wahlenb.) Hiern (1899); Minuartia rubella f. epilis (Fernald) J.Cay. (1986); Minuartia rubella var. glabrata (Cham. & Schltdl.) Peschkova (1979); Minuartia verna subsp. glacialis (Fenzl) Kuvaev (1981); Minuartia verna var. rubella Ostenf. (1920); Sabulina propinqua (Richardson) Rydb. (1931); Tryphane rubella (Wahlenb.) Á.Löve & D.Löve ex W.A.Weber (2009); Tryphane rubella subsp. propinqua (Richardson) Á.Löve & D.Löve ex W.A.Weber (2009)

= Sabulina rubella =

Species of flowering plant

Sabulina rubella is a species of flowering plant in the family Caryophyllaceae known by several common names, including beautiful sandwort, mountain sandwort, Arctic sandwort, and boreal stitchwort.

== Description ==
This is a small, mat-forming perennial herb growing in a low, tight clump of hairy, glandular herbage. The green, three-veined leaves are needlelike or flattened, no more than a centimeter long and a millimeter wide. The plant blooms in summer with tiny flowers made up of pointed sepals under 4 millimeters long and five white petals roughly the same length or slightly smaller.

== Distribution and habitat ==
It has a circumboreal distribution, occurring throughout the northernmost Northern Hemisphere from the Arctic Circle on the Arctic tundra into the alpine climates of mountainous areas in temperate Eurasia and North America. It grows in rocky, moist, often barren habitat, including gravelly, sparsely vegetated slopes with little organic matter. It is a calciphile, growing in calcareous substrates such as soils rich in decomposed limestone.
