= Sabulina rosei =

Scientific classification
- Kingdom: Plantae
- Clade: Tracheophytes
- Clade: Angiosperms
- Clade: Eudicots
- Order: Caryophyllales
- Family: Caryophyllaceae
- Genus: Sabulina
- Species: S. rosei

Binomial name
- Sabulina rosei (Maguire & Barneby) McNeill

Synonyms
- Arenaria rosei Maguire & Barneby (1956); Minuartia rosei (Maguire & Barneby) McNeill (1980)

Species of flowering plant

Sabulina rosei is an uncommon species of flowering plant in the family Caryophyllaceae known by the common names peanut sandwort and peanut stitchwort.

It is endemic to northwestern California, in the Klamath Mountains and North California Coast Ranges. It grows in serpentine soils in oak and pine woodlands and forests.

== Description ==
Sabulina rosei is a rhizomatous perennial herb forming a low mat of waxy herbage with thin, erect flowering stems. The tiny green needle-like leaves are up to 1.5 centimeters long and less than 2 millimeters wide.

The hairy, glandular inflorescence bears flowers with five white petals each under a centimeter long.
