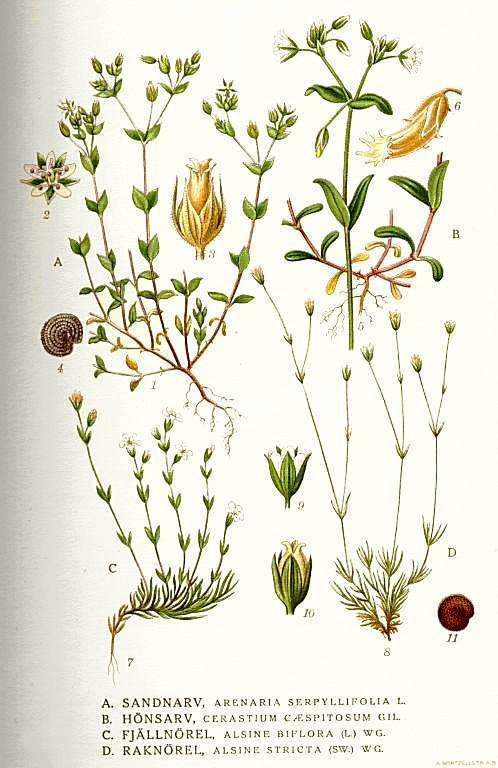
- Fig. D (as Alsine stricta)

Conservation status
- Secure (NatureServe)

Scientific classification
- Kingdom: Plantae
- Clade: Tracheophytes
- Clade: Angiosperms
- Clade: Eudicots
- Order: Caryophyllales
- Family: Caryophyllaceae
- Genus: Sabulina
- Species: S. stricta

Binomial name
- Sabulina stricta (Sw.) Rchb. (1832)

Synonyms
- Synonymy: Alsinanthe stricta (Sw.) Rchb. (1841); Alsinanthe uliginosa (Schleich. ex DC.) Rchb. (1841); Alsine rossii Fenzl in Vers. Darstell. Alsin.: 18 (1833); Alsine stricta (Sw.) Wahlenb. (1812); Alsine stricta Mert. & W.D.J.Koch (1831), nom. illeg.; Alsine uliginosa (Schleich. ex DC.) Syme (1863), nom. illeg.; Alsinella stricta (Sw.) Sw. (1814); Alsinopsis stricta (Sw.) Small (1903); Arenaria baicalensis Steud. (1840); Arenaria muscorum Adans. ex Fisch. (1824), not validly publ.; Arenaria stricta var. uliginosa (Schleich. ex DC.) B.Boivin (1966); Arenaria tenella Turcz. ex Steud. (1840), not validly publ.; Arenaria uliginosa Schleich. ex DC. (1805); Arenaria uliginosa f. albina Polunin (1940); Minuartia pusilla Schischk. (1936), nom. illeg.; Minuartia schischkinii Adylov (1967); Minuartia stricta (Sw.) Hiern (1899); Spergula stricta Sw. (1799) (basionym)

= Sabulina stricta =

Species of flowering plant

Sabulina stricta is a species of flowering plant in the family Caryophyllaceae known by the common names bog stitchwort, Teesdale sandwort and rock sandwort. It has a circumboreal distribution, occurring throughout much of the northernmost Northern Hemisphere from the lower Arctic into the alpine climates of mountainous areas in temperate Eurasia and North America. It grows in several types of habitat, including meadows, marshes, heath, beaches and bars, and arctic and alpine tundra.

This is a small, mat-forming perennial herb just a few centimeters high. The green or purplish, hairless, needlelike leaves are no more than a centimeter long and barely over a millimeter wide. The thin, flowering stems are sometimes erect, bearing tiny flowers with pointed sepals just a few millimeters long. The flowers often lack petals, or may have rudimentary petals no longer than the sepals.

It became a protected species in the UK in 1975 under the Conservation of Wild Creatures and Wild Plants Act.
