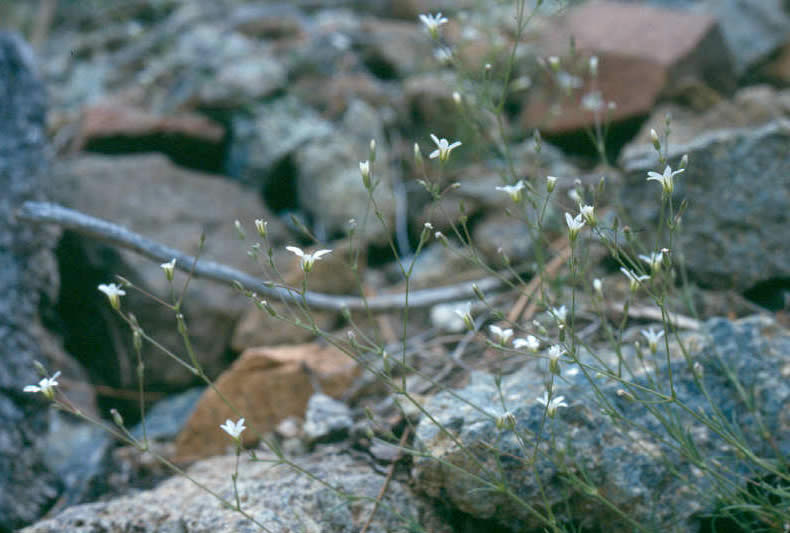

Conservation status
- Imperiled (NatureServe)

Scientific classification
- Kingdom: Plantae
- Clade: Tracheophytes
- Clade: Angiosperms
- Clade: Eudicots
- Order: Caryophyllales
- Family: Caryophyllaceae
- Genus: Sabulina
- Species: S. stolonifera

Binomial name
- Sabulina stolonifera (T.W.Nelson & J.P.Nelson) Dillenb. & Kadereit (2014)

Synonyms
- Minuartia stolonifera T.W.Nelson & J.P.Nelson (1991)

= Sabulina stolonifera =

Species of flowering plant

Sabulina stolonifera is a rare species of flowering plant in the pink family known by the common names Scott Mountain sandwort and stolon sandwort.

It is endemic to Siskiyou County, California, where it is known from only two occurrences in the Scott Mountains of the Klamath Range.

It is a member of the serpentine soils flora in the area, growing amidst Jeffrey Pines with other rare local plants such as the Mt. Eddy lupine (Lupinus lapidicola).

== Description ==
Sabulina stolonifera is a stoloniferous perennial herb forming a low mat of hairless herbage 10 to 20 centimeters high with thin, erect flowering stems. The tiny rigid needle-like leaves are under a centimeter long and a millimeter wide.

The hairy, glandular inflorescence bears flowers with five white petals each under a centimeter long.
