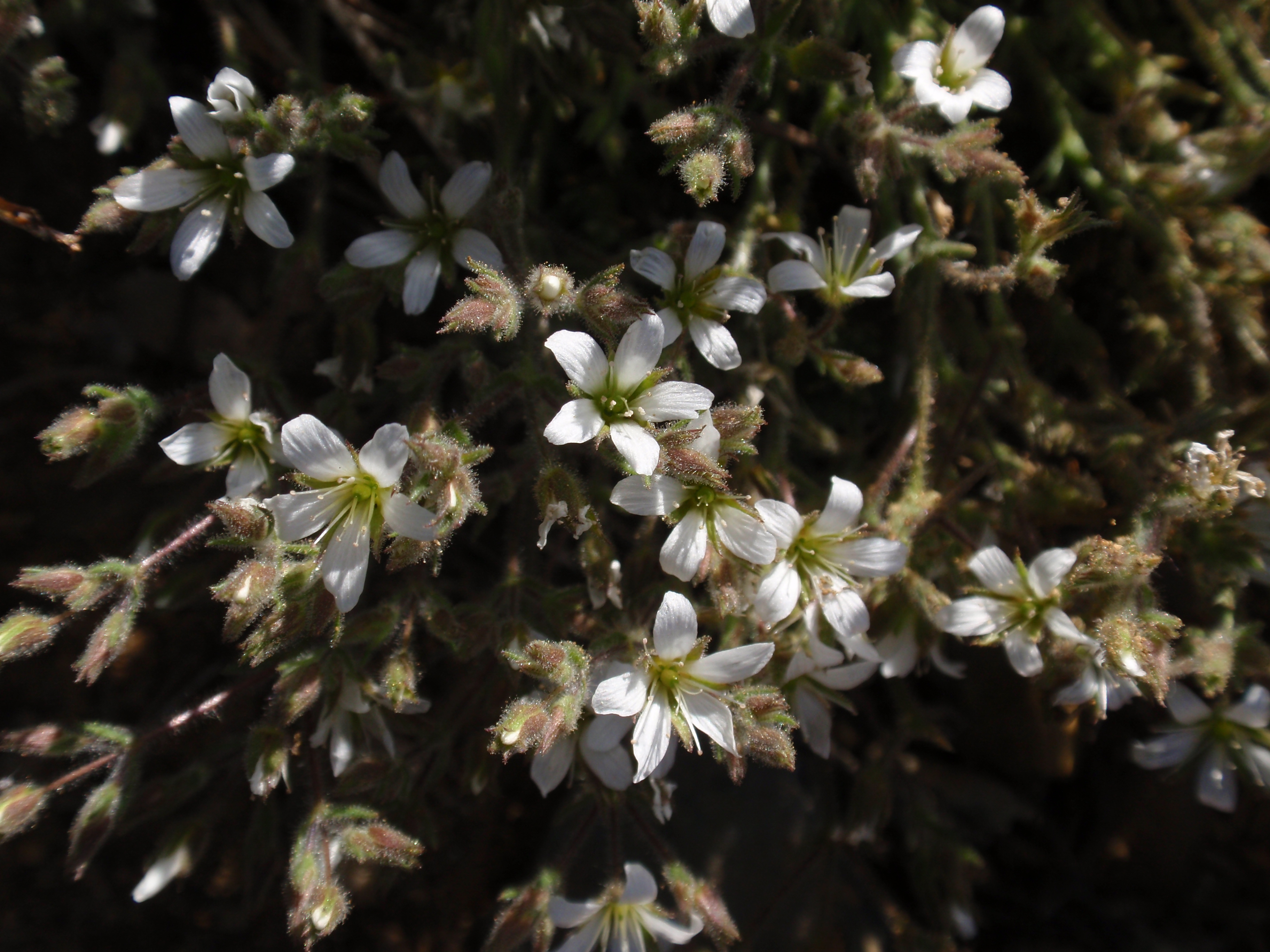

Scientific classification
- Kingdom: Plantae
- Clade: Tracheophytes
- Clade: Angiosperms
- Clade: Eudicots
- Order: Caryophyllales
- Family: Caryophyllaceae
- Genus: Sabulina
- Species: S. nuttallii

Binomial name
- Sabulina nuttallii (Pax) Dillenb. & Kadereit (2014)

Varieties
- Sabulina nuttallii var. fragilis (Maguire & A.H.Holmgren) Dillenb. & Kadereit; Sabulina nuttallii var. gracilis (B.L.Rob.) Dillenb. & Kadereit; Sabulina nuttallii var. gregaria (A.Heller) Dillenb. & Kadereit; Sabulina nuttallii var. nuttallii

Synonyms
- Alsinopsis nuttallii (Pax) Small (1903); Alsinopsis occidentalis A.Heller (1912); Arenaria nuttallii Pax (1893); Arenaria pungens Nutt. (1838), nom. illeg.; Minuartia nuttallii (Pax) Briq. (1911); Minuartia occidentalis (A.Heller) House (1921); Minuartia pungens Mattf. (1921), nom. superfl.; Minuopsis nuttallii (Pax) W.A.Weber (1989)

= Sabulina nuttallii =

Species of flowering plant

Sabulina nuttallii is a species of flowering plant in the family Caryophyllaceae known by the common names Nuttall's sandwort and brittle sandwort.

It is native to western North America from southwestern Canada to California and Nevada, where it grows in several types of habitat, including rocky and barren ridges, chaparral and woodlands, often on serpentine soils.

== Description ==
Sabulina nuttallii is a rhizomatous perennial herb forming low mats of glandular, hairy herbage. The thin, rigid, sometimes needlelike leaves may be just over a centimeter long but are barely a millimeter wide.

The small flowers have five white petals usually under a centimeter long and ribbed, pointed sepals.

== Varieties ==
Four varieties are accepted.

- Sabulina nuttallii var. fragilis (Maguire & A.H.Holmgren) Dillenb. & Kadereit – California, Nevada, and Oregon
- Sabulina nuttallii var. gracilis (B.L.Rob.) Dillenb. & Kadereit – California, Nevada, and Oregon
- Sabulina nuttallii var. gregaria (A.Heller) Dillenb. & Kadereit – southwestern Oregon and northwestern California
- Sabulina nuttallii var. nuttallii – Alberta, British Columbia, Colorado, Idaho, Montana, Oregon, Utah, Washington, and Wyoming
