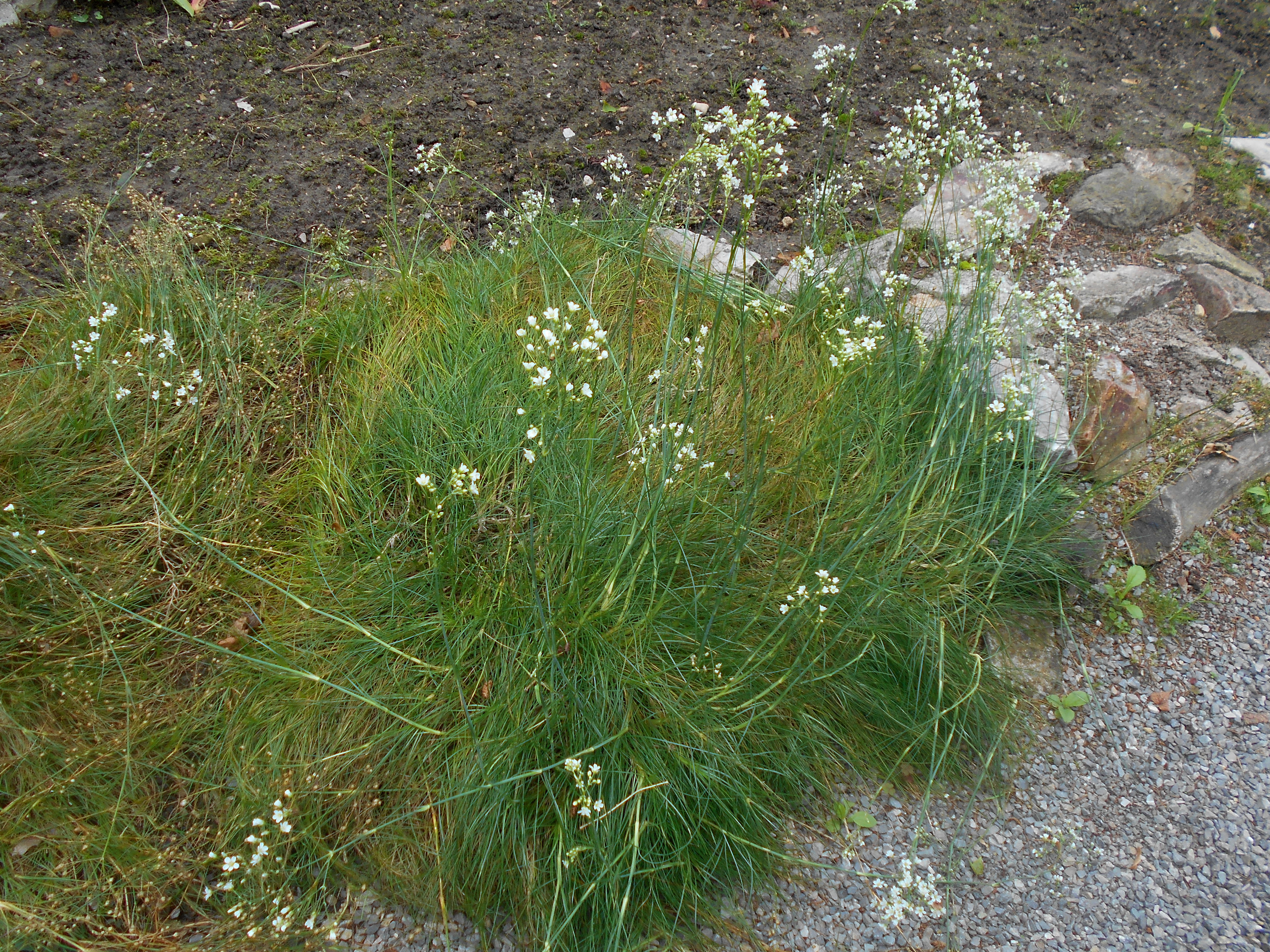

Scientific classification
- Kingdom: Plantae
- Clade: Tracheophytes
- Clade: Angiosperms
- Clade: Eudicots
- Order: Caryophyllales
- Family: Caryophyllaceae
- Genus: Mcneillia
- Species: M. graminifolia

Binomial name
- Mcneillia graminifolia (Ard.) Dillenb. & Kadereit (2014)

Subspecies
- Mcneillia graminifolia subsp. brachypetala (Kamari) Dillenb. & Kadereit; Mcneillia graminifolia subsp. clandestina (Port.) Dillenb. & Kadereit; Mcneillia graminifolia subsp. graminifolia; Mcneillia graminifolia subsp. hungarica (Jáv.) F.Conti & Bartolucci; Mcneillia graminifolia subsp. rosanoi (Ten.) F.Conti, Bartolucci, Iamonico & Del Guacchio

Synonyms
- Alsine arduinoi (Vis.) Fenzl (1833); Alsine graminifolia (Ard.) Bluff, Nees & Schauer (1837), nom. illeg.; Arenaria arduinoi Vis. (1826); Arenaria graminifolia Ard. (1764); Minuartia graminifolia (Ard.) Jáv. (1914); Pettera graminifolia (Ard.) Rchb. (1841); Sabulina graminifolia (Ard.) Rchb. (1832)

= Mcneillia graminifolia =

Species of flowering plant

Mcneillia graminifolia is a species of flowering plant in the carnation family, Caryophyllaceae. It is a subshrub native to southeastern Europe, including Italy, Sicily, the former Yugoslav countries, Albania, Greece, and Romania.

== Subspecies ==
Five subspecies are accepted.

- Mcneillia graminifolia subsp. brachypetala (Kamari) Dillenb. & Kadereit – northwestern Greece
- Mcneillia graminifolia subsp. clandestina (Port.) Dillenb. & Kadereit – northwestern Balkan Peninsula countries to northern and northeastern Albania
- Mcneillia graminifolia subsp. graminifolia – northeastern Italy
- Mcneillia graminifolia subsp. hungarica (Jáv.) F.Conti & Bartolucci – southwestern Romania
- Mcneillia graminifolia subsp. rosanoi (Ten.) F.Conti, Bartolucci, Iamonico & Del Guacchio – central and south-central Italy and northern Sicily
