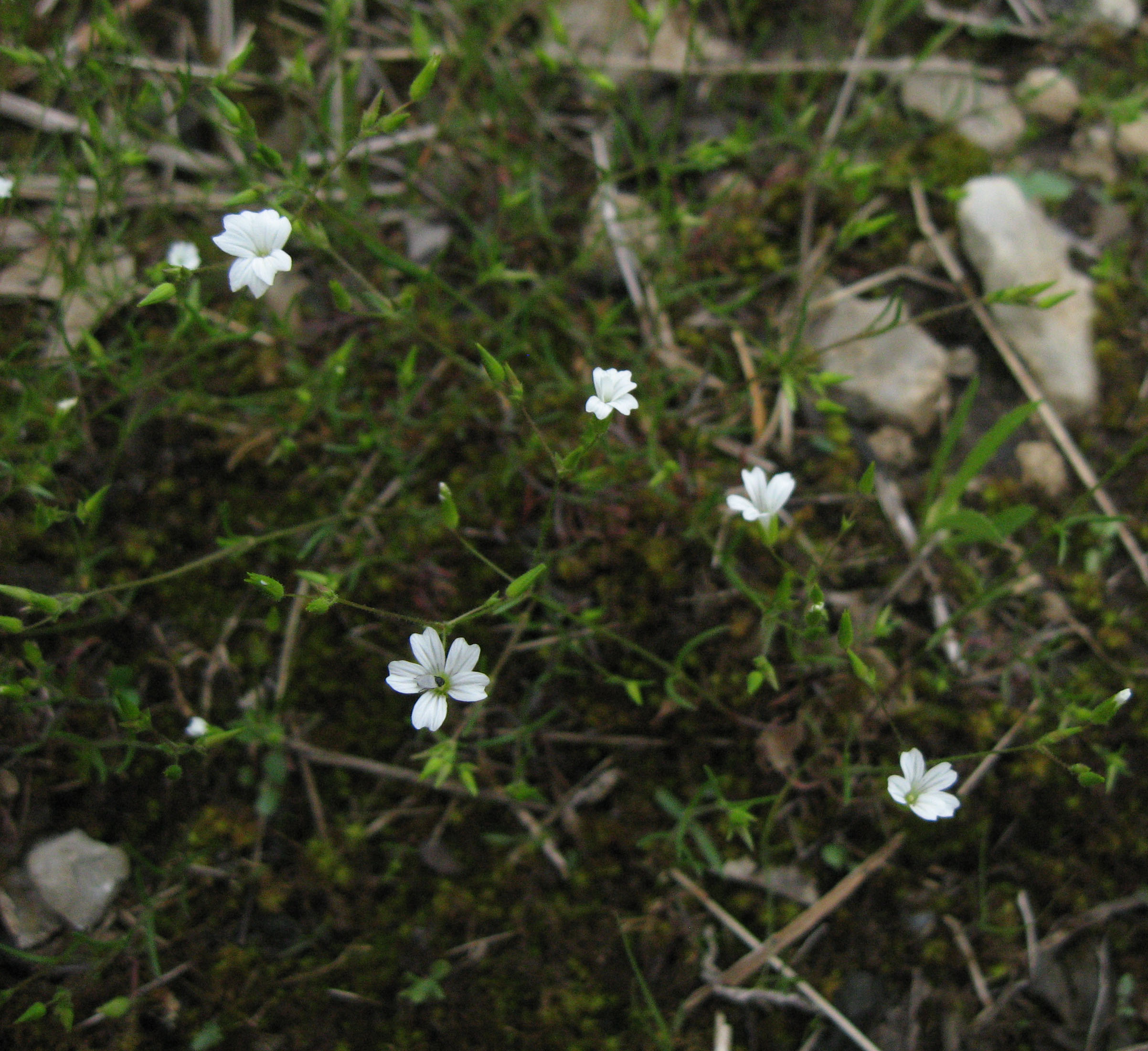

- 1913 illustration

Scientific classification
- Kingdom: Plantae
- Clade: Tracheophytes
- Clade: Angiosperms
- Clade: Eudicots
- Order: Caryophyllales
- Family: Caryophyllaceae
- Genus: Sabulina
- Species: S. patula

Binomial name
- Sabulina patula (Michx.) Small ex Rydb. (1932)

Synonyms
- Alsine microsperma Fenzl ex Torr. & A.Gray (1840); Alsine patula A.Gray in Manual, ed. 2: 58 (1856); Alsine patula var. pitcheri Chapm. (1892); Alsine pitcheri (Nutt.) A.Wood (1845); Alsinopsis patula (Michx.) Small (1903); Arenaria patula Michx. (1803) – basionym; Arenaria patula f. media Steyerm. (1941); Arenaria patula f. pitcheri (Nutt.) Steyerm. (1941); Arenaria pitcheri Nutt. (1838); Arenaria sphaerocarpa Martrin-Donos (1864); Minuartia patula (Michx.) Mattf. (1921); Minuartia patula f. media (Steyerm.) G.Wilh. & Rericha (2016); Mononeuria patula (Michx.) Dillenb. & Kadereit (2014); Stellaria macropetala Torr. & A.Gray (1838)

= Sabulina patula =

Species of flowering plant

Sabulina patula, common names pitcher's stitchwort or lime-barren sandwort, is an annual plant in the family Caryophyllaceae. It is native to sections of the eastern and central United States, primarily the lower Mississippi Valley, the southern Great Plains, and the Tennessee Valley, with additional scattered populations in Georgia, Virginia, Pennsylvania, and the southern Great Lakes region.

Sabulina patula is found on limestone outcrops and in rocky barrens and glades. It is a small, delicate annual species with thin red stems up to 30 centimetres (1 ft) long, erect (upright) or ascending (trailing along the ground at first, then curving upwards). It very often has numerous stems crossing each other so as to form a clump of many stems. Leaves are in pairs, narrow and rarely more than 20 millimetres (0.8 in) long. Flowers are white, forming in the spring then quickly wilting.

Sabulina patula is highly variable throughout its range, and multiple varieties have been named, though none of these is widely accepted today.
