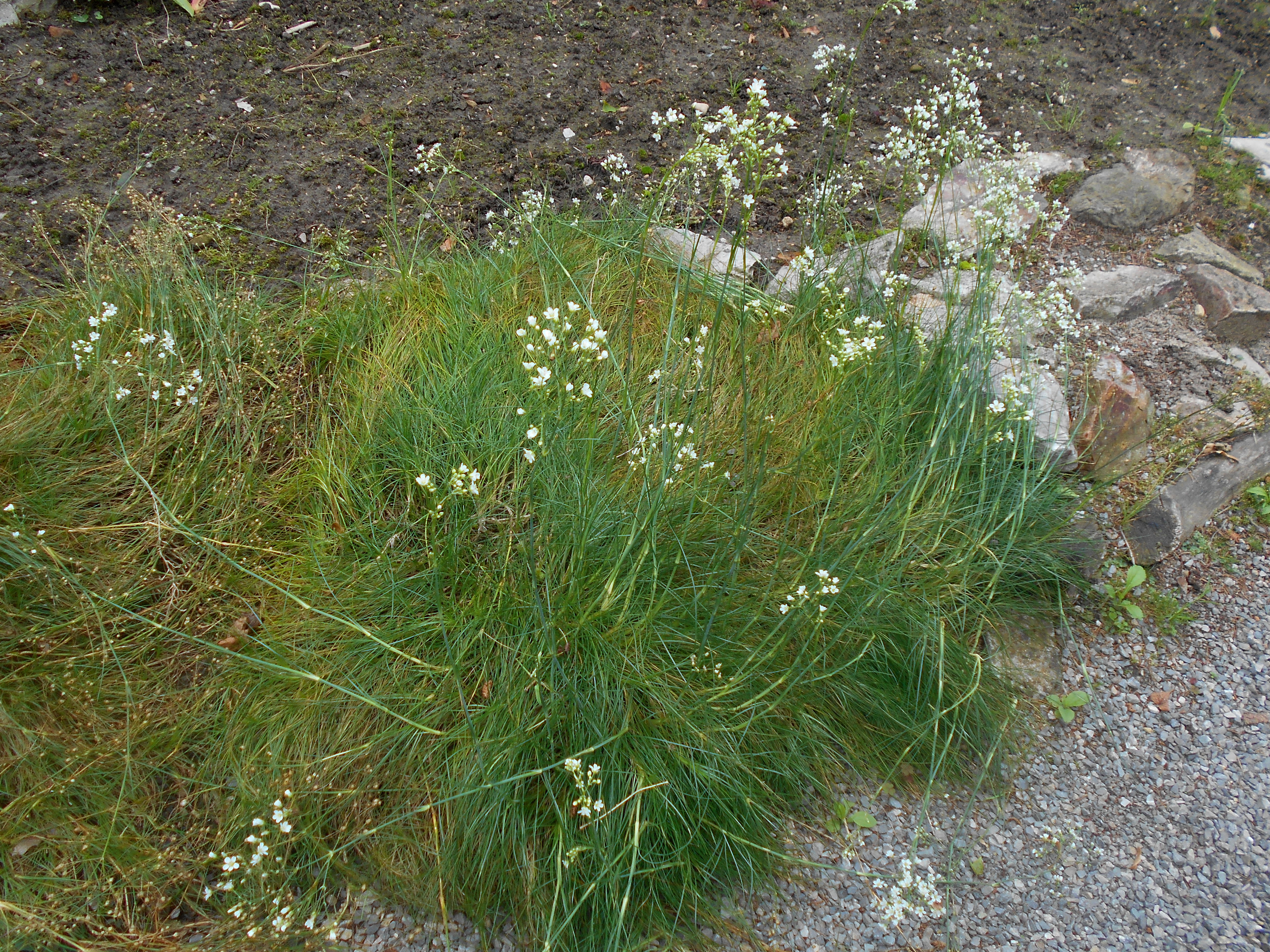
- Mcneillia graminifolia

Scientific classification
- Kingdom: Plantae
- Clade: Tracheophytes
- Clade: Angiosperms
- Clade: Eudicots
- Order: Caryophyllales
- Family: Caryophyllaceae
- Genus: Mcneillia; Dillenb. & Kadereit (2014)

Synonyms
- Pettera Rchb. (1841)

= Mcneillia =

Genus of plants

Mcneillia is a genus of flowering plants belonging to the family Caryophyllaceae.

Its native range is southeastern Europe to Turkey.

== Species ==
Five species are accepted.

- Mcneillia graminifolia (Ard.) Dillenb. & Kadereit
- Mcneillia moraldoi (F.Conti) Dillenb. & Kadereit
- Mcneillia pseudosaxifraga (Mattf.) Dillenb. & Kadereit
- Mcneillia saxifraga (Friv.) Dillenb. & Kadereit
- Mcneillia stellata (E.D.Clarke) Dillenb. & Kadereit
