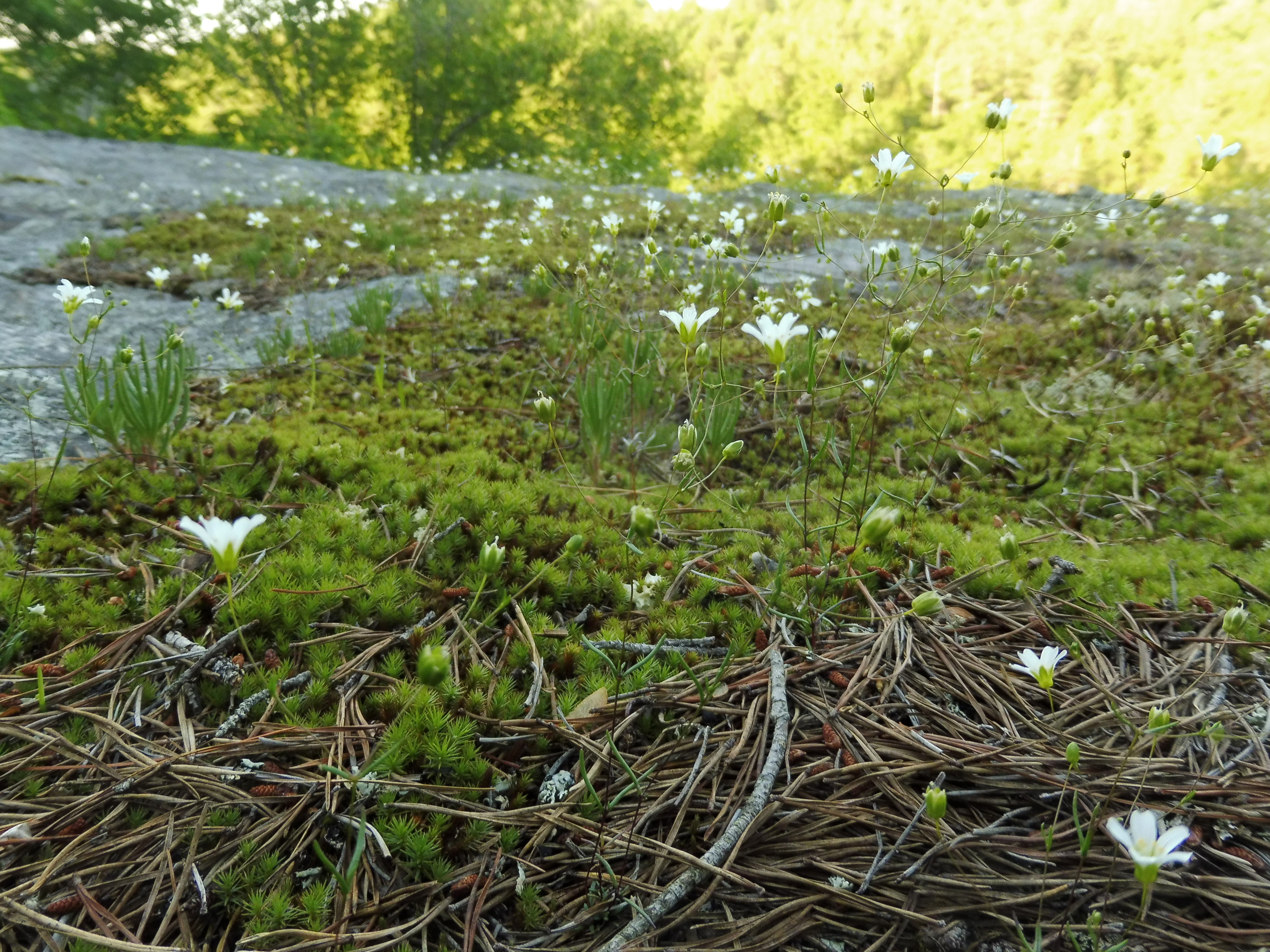

Scientific classification
- Kingdom: Plantae
- Clade: Tracheophytes
- Clade: Angiosperms
- Clade: Eudicots
- Order: Caryophyllales
- Family: Caryophyllaceae
- Genus: Geocarpon
- Species: G. glabrum

Binomial name
- Geocarpon glabrum (Michx.) E.E.Schill. (2022)

Synonyms
- Alsine glabra (Michx.) A.Gray ex Chapm. (1860); Alsine glabra (Michx.) A.Gray (1856); Alsinopsis glabra (Michx.) Small (1903); Arenaria glabra Michx. (1803); Arenaria groenlandica var. glabra (Michx.) Fernald (1919); Arenaria imbricata Banks ex Steud. (1840), not validly publ.; Minuartia glabra (Michx.) Mattf. (1921); Minuartia groenlandica subsp. glabra (Michx.) Á.Löve & D.Löve (1965); Mononeuria glabra (Michx.) Dillenb. & Kadereit (2014); Porsildia groenlandica subsp. glabra (Michx.) Á.Löve & D.Löve (1975 publ. 1976); Sabularia glabra (Michx.) Small (1933); Sabulina glabra (Michx.) Small (1933)

= Geocarpon glabrum =

Species of flowering plant

Geocarpon glabrum, commonly called Appalachian stichwort, is a species of flowering plant in the carnation family (Caryophyllaceae). It is native to the eastern United States, where it has a scattered distribution.

Its natural habitat is areas of siliceous rock outcrops, which include granite, sandstone, gneiss, and schist. In the Cumberland Mountains, this species is a major component of sandstone glade communities. Due to its narrow habitat requirements, this species is uncommon throughout its range.

Geocarpon glabrum is a small, delicate annual. It produces white flowers in late spring and early summer. It is similar to Geocarpon groenlandicum, which it was historically considered a variety of. It can be distinguished from G. groenlandicum by its taller stature, annual habit, upright and not mat-forming growth, smaller petals, and flowers in greater number per cyme. In addition, G. glabrum is found in lower elevations than G. groenlandicum.
