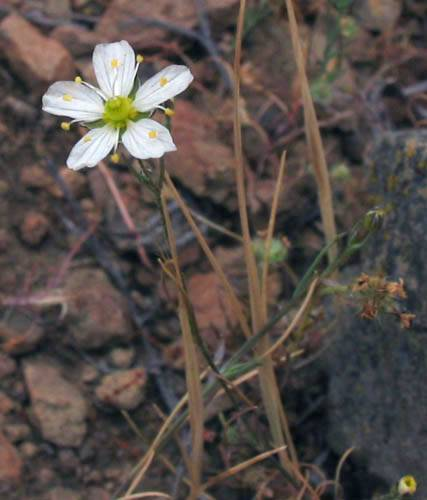

Scientific classification
- Kingdom: Plantae
- Clade: Tracheophytes
- Clade: Angiosperms
- Clade: Eudicots
- Order: Caryophyllales
- Family: Caryophyllaceae
- Genus: Sabulina
- Species: S. douglasii

Binomial name
- Sabulina douglasii (Torr. & A.Gray) Dillenb. & Kadereit (2014)

Synonyms
- Alsine douglasii (Fenzl ex Torr. & A.Gray) Fenzl ex J.Gay (1845); Alsinopsis douglasii (Fenzl ex Torr. & A.Gray) A.Heller (1912); Arenaria douglasii Fenzl ex Torr. & A.Gray (1840) (basionym); Arenaria douglasii var. emarginata H.Sharsm. (1945); Arenaria emarginata (H.Sharsm.) Hoover (1966), nom. illeg.; Minuartia douglasii var. emarginata (H.Sharsm.) McNeill (1980); Greniera douglasii (Fenzl ex Torr. & A.Gray) J.Gay (1845); Minuartia douglasii (Fenzl ex Torr. & A.Gray) Mattf. (1921)

= Sabulina douglasii =

Species of flowering plant

Sabulina douglasii is a species of flowering plant in the family Caryophyllaceae known by the common name Douglas' stitchwort.

It is native to the chaparral and oak woodlands in much of California, southern Oregon, and parts of Arizona.

== Description ==
Sabulina douglasii is an annual herb growing to a maximum height of 30 centimeters with a slender green or purplish stem which sometimes has thin branches. The threadlike, curling leaves may be up to 4 centimeters long but are under a millimeter wide.

The small flower has five white petals each a few millimeters long and smaller, ribbed sepals.
