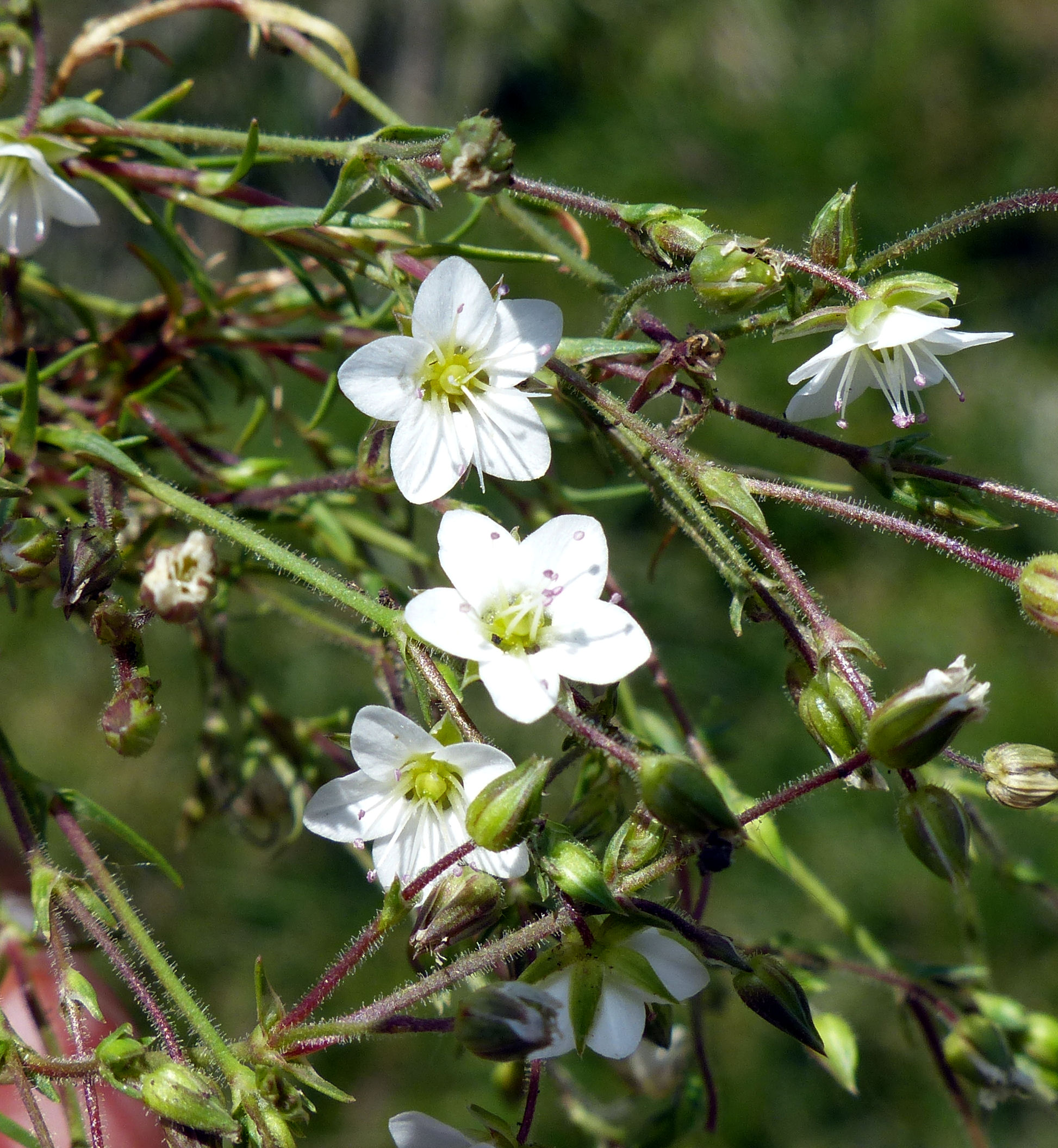
- Sabulina verna

Scientific classification
- Kingdom: Plantae
- Clade: Tracheophytes
- Clade: Angiosperms
- Clade: Eudicots
- Order: Caryophyllales
- Family: Caryophyllaceae
- Genus: Sabulina; Rchb. (1832)

Species
- 74; see text

Synonyms
- Minuopsis W.A.Weber (1989); Mononeuria Rchb. (1841); Neumayera Rchb. (1841); Porsildia Á.Löve & D.Löve (1975 publ. 1976); Sabularia Small (1933), orth. var.; Tryphane (Fenzl) Rchb. (1841); Xeralsine Fourr. (1868)

= Sabulina (plant) =

Genus of flowering plants

Sabulina is a genus of flowering plants in the family Caryophyllaceae. It includes 74 species native to temperate and subtropical North America, Eurasia, and North Africa.

== Species ==
74 species are accepted.

- Sabulina acutiflora (Fenzl ex Endl.) Dillenb. & Kadereit
- Sabulina afghanica (Rech.f.) Dillenb. & Kadereit
- Sabulina armena (Schischk. ex Ikonn.) Dillenb. & Kadereit
- Sabulina asiyeae (H.Duman) Koç & Hamzaoğlu
- Sabulina attica (Boiss. & Spruner) Dillenb. & Kadereit
- Sabulina aucheriana (Boiss.) Dillenb. & Kadereit
- Sabulina austriaca (Jacq.) Rchb.
- Sabulina austromontana (S.J.Wolf & Packer) Dillenb. & Kadereit
- Sabulina basaltica B.S.Legler
- Sabulina biebersteinii (Rupr.) Dillenb. & Kadereit
- Sabulina bilykiana (Klokov) Dillenb. & Kadereit
- Sabulina californica (A.Gray) Dillenb. & Kadereit
- Sabulina chlorosciadia (Rech.f.) Dillenb. & Kadereit
- Sabulina cismontana (Meinke & Zika) Dillenb. & Kadereit
- Sabulina daralagexica (Schischk. ex Ikonn.) Dillenb. & Kadereit
- Sabulina dawsonensis (Britton) Rydb.
- Sabulina decandra (Rchb.) Dillenb. & Kadereit
- Sabulina decumbens (T.W.Nelson & J.P.Nelson) Dillenb. & Kadereit
- Sabulina douglasii (Fenzl ex Torr. & A.Gray) Dillenb. & Kadereit
- Sabulina elegans (Cham. & Schltdl.) Dillenb. & Kadereit
- Sabulina foliosa (Royle ex Edgew. & Hook.f.) Dillenb. & Kadereit
- Sabulina fontinalis (Short & R.Peter) Dillenb. & Kadereit
- Sabulina glandulosa (Boiss. & A.Huet) Dillenb. & Kadereit
- Sabulina glaucina (Dvořáková) Dillenb. & Kadereit
- Sabulina gracilipes (Kom.) Dillenb. & Kadereit
- Sabulina gracilis (McNeill) Dillenb. & Kadereit
- Sabulina helmii (Fisch. ex Ser.) Dillenb. & Kadereit
- Sabulina howellii (S.Watson) Dillenb. & Kadereit
- Sabulina jacutica (Schischk.) Dillenb. & Kadereit
- Sabulina juniperina (L.) Dillenb. & Kadereit
- Sabulina kashmirica (Edgew.) Dillenb. & Kadereit
- Sabulina khorassanica (Assadi & Mostafavi) Dillenb. & Kadereit
- Sabulina kryloviana (Schischk.) Dillenb. & Kadereit
- Sabulina lineata (Boiss.) Dillenb. & Kadereit
- Sabulina litwinowii (Schischk.) Dillenb. & Kadereit
- Sabulina macra (A.Nelson & J.F.Macbr.) Dillenb. & Kadereit
- Sabulina macrantha (Rydb.) Dillenb. & Kadereit
- Sabulina mediterranea (Ledeb. ex Link) Rchb.
- Sabulina mesogitana (Boiss.) Dillenb. & Kadereit
- Sabulina michauxii (Fenzl) Dillenb. & Kadereit
- Sabulina muscorum (Fassett) E.E.Schill.
- Sabulina nerimaniae Koç & Hamzaoğlu
- Sabulina nuristanica (Rech.f.) Dillenb. & Kadereit
- Sabulina nuttallii (Pax) Dillenb. & Kadereit
- Sabulina oxypetala (Woł.) Mosyakin & Fedor.
- Sabulina paludicola (Fernald & B.G.Schub.) E.E.Schill.
- Sabulina patula (Michx.) Small ex Rydb.
- Sabulina pichleri (Boiss.) Dillenb. & Kadereit
- Sabulina pseudohybrida (Klokov) Mosyakin & Fedor.
- Sabulina pusilla (S.Watson) Dillenb. & Kadereit
- Sabulina regeliana (Trautv.) Dillenb. & Kadereit
- Sabulina rimarum (Boiss. & Balansa) Dillenb. & Kadereit
- Sabulina rosei (Maguire & Barneby) Dillenb. & Kadereit
- Sabulina rossii (R.Br. ex Richardson) Dillenb. & Kadereit
- Sabulina rubella (Wahlenb.) Dillenb. & Kadereit
- Sabulina sabalanica (Assadi & Mostafavi) Dillenb. & Kadereit
- Sabulina sororia B.S.Legler
- Sabulina stolonifera (T.W.Nelson & J.P.Nelson) Dillenb. & Kadereit
- Sabulina stricta (Sw.) Rchb.
- Sabulina sublineata (Rech.f.) Dillenb. & Kadereit
- Sabulina subtilis (Fenzl) Dillenb. & Kadereit
- Sabulina subuniflora (Albov) Dillenb. & Kadereit
- Sabulina taurica (Steven) Dillenb. & Kadereit
- Sabulina tenuifolia (L.) Rchb.
- Sabulina thymifolia (Sm.) Dillenb. & Kadereit
- Sabulina tortumensis Koç & Hamzaoğlu
- Sabulina turcomanica (Schischk.) Dillenb. & Kadereit
- Sabulina umbellulifera (Boiss. & Balansa) Dillenb. & Kadereit
- Sabulina uralensis (Clerc) Dillenb. & Kadereit
- Sabulina urumiensis (Bornm.) Koç & Hamzaoğlu
- Sabulina velenovskyi (Rohlena) Dillenb. & Kadereit
- Sabulina verna (L.) Rchb.
- Sabulina villarii (Balb.) Rchb.
- Sabulina viscosa (Schreb.) Rchb.
