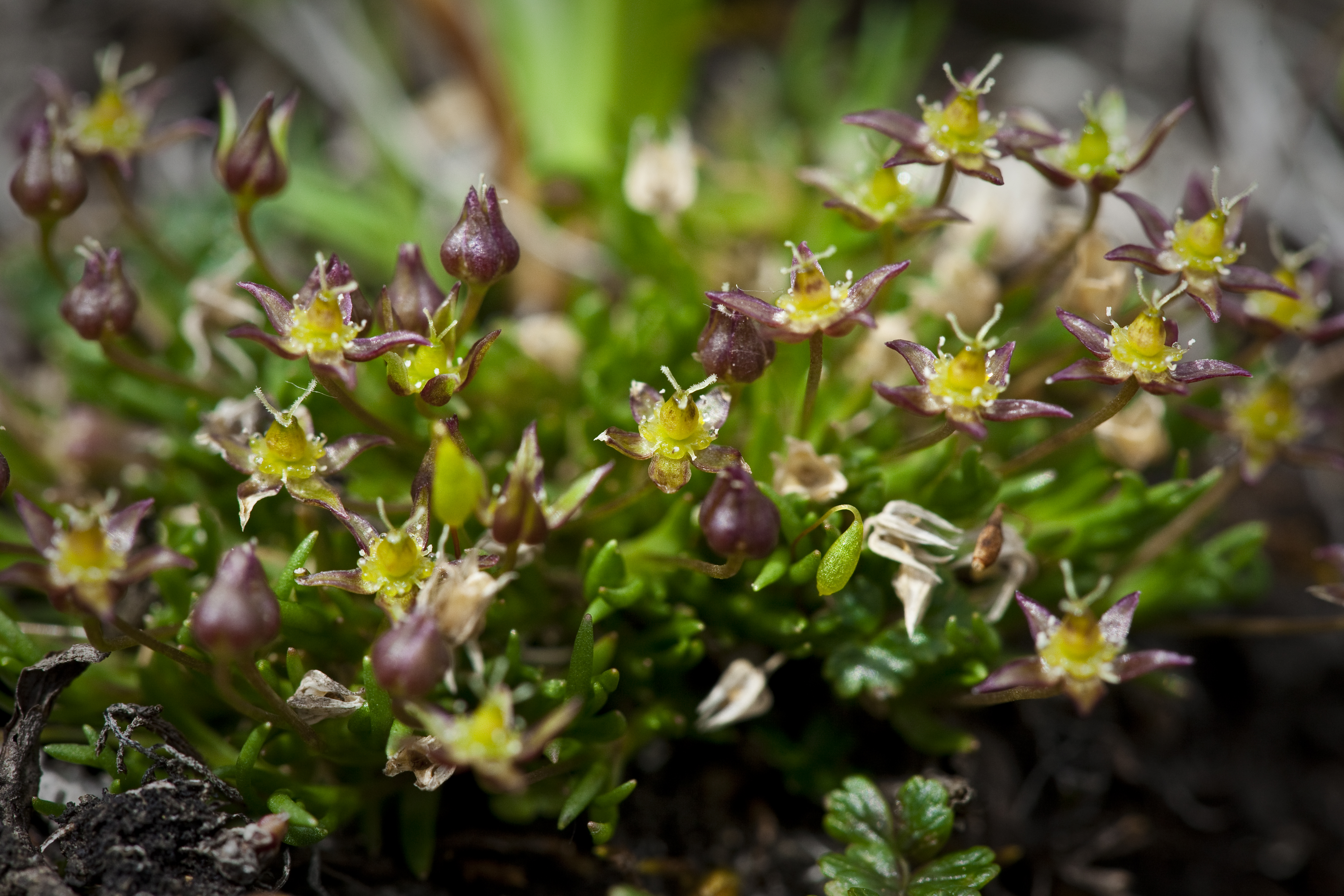

Scientific classification
- Kingdom: Plantae
- Clade: Tracheophytes
- Clade: Angiosperms
- Clade: Eudicots
- Order: Caryophyllales
- Family: Caryophyllaceae
- Genus: Sabulina
- Species: S. elegans

Binomial name
- Sabulina elegans (Cham. & Schltdl.)

Synonyms
- Alsinanthe elegans (Cham. & Schltdl.) Á.Löve & D.Löve (1975 publ. 1976); Alsine elegans (Cham. & Schltdl.) Fenzl (1833); Arenaria elegans Cham. & Schltdl. (1826) (basionym); Arenaria rossii var. columbiana Raup (1934); Arenaria rossii subsp. columbiana (Raup) Maguire (1958); Arenaria rossii subsp. elegans (Cham. & Schltdl.) Maguire (1958); Arenaria rossii var. elegans (Cham. & Schltdl.) S.L.Welsh (1968); Minuartia elegans (Cham. & Schltdl.) Schischk. (1936); Minuartia orthotrichoides Schischk. (1936); Minuartia rossii subsp. elegans (Cham. & Schltdl.) Rebrist. (1971); Minuartia rossii var. elegans (Cham. & Schltdl.) Hultén (1967 publ. 1968); Minuartia rossii var. orthotrichoides (Schischk.) Hultén (1967 publ. 1968); Sabulina orthotrichoides (Schischk.) Mosyakin & Fedor. (2015)

= Sabulina elegans =

Species of flowering plant

Sabulina elegans, the elegant stichwort or Ross' stitchwort, is a species of flowering plant. It is native to Alaska and northwestern Canada (Alberta, British Columbia, Northwest Territories, and Yukon Territory).
