= Sabulina californica =

Scientific classification
- Kingdom: Plantae
- Clade: Tracheophytes
- Clade: Angiosperms
- Clade: Eudicots
- Order: Caryophyllales
- Family: Caryophyllaceae
- Genus: Sabulina
- Species: S. californica

Binomial name
- Sabulina californica (A.Gray) Dillenb. & Kadereit (2014)

Synonyms
- Alsinopsis californica (A.Gray) A.Heller (1912); Arenaria brevifolia var. californica A.Gray (1864); Arenaria californica (A.Gray) Brewer (1876); Minuartia californica (A.Gray) Mattf. (1921); Arenaria pusilla var. diffusa Maguire (1951); Minuartia pusilla var. diffusa (Maguire) McNeill (1980)

Species of flowering plant

Sabulina californica, commonly known as California sandwort, is a species of flowering plant in the family Caryophyllaceae.

It is native to valleys, foothills, and mountains in California and Oregon. It grows in many types of habitat, including chaparral, vernal pools, and roadsides.

== Description ==
Sabulina californica is a small annual herb producing a hair-thin stem no more than 12 centimeters tall, in erect or spreading, branching form. The narrow leaves are just a few millimeters long and under 2 millimeters wide.

The tiny flower has five white petals and five veined, pointed sepals.
