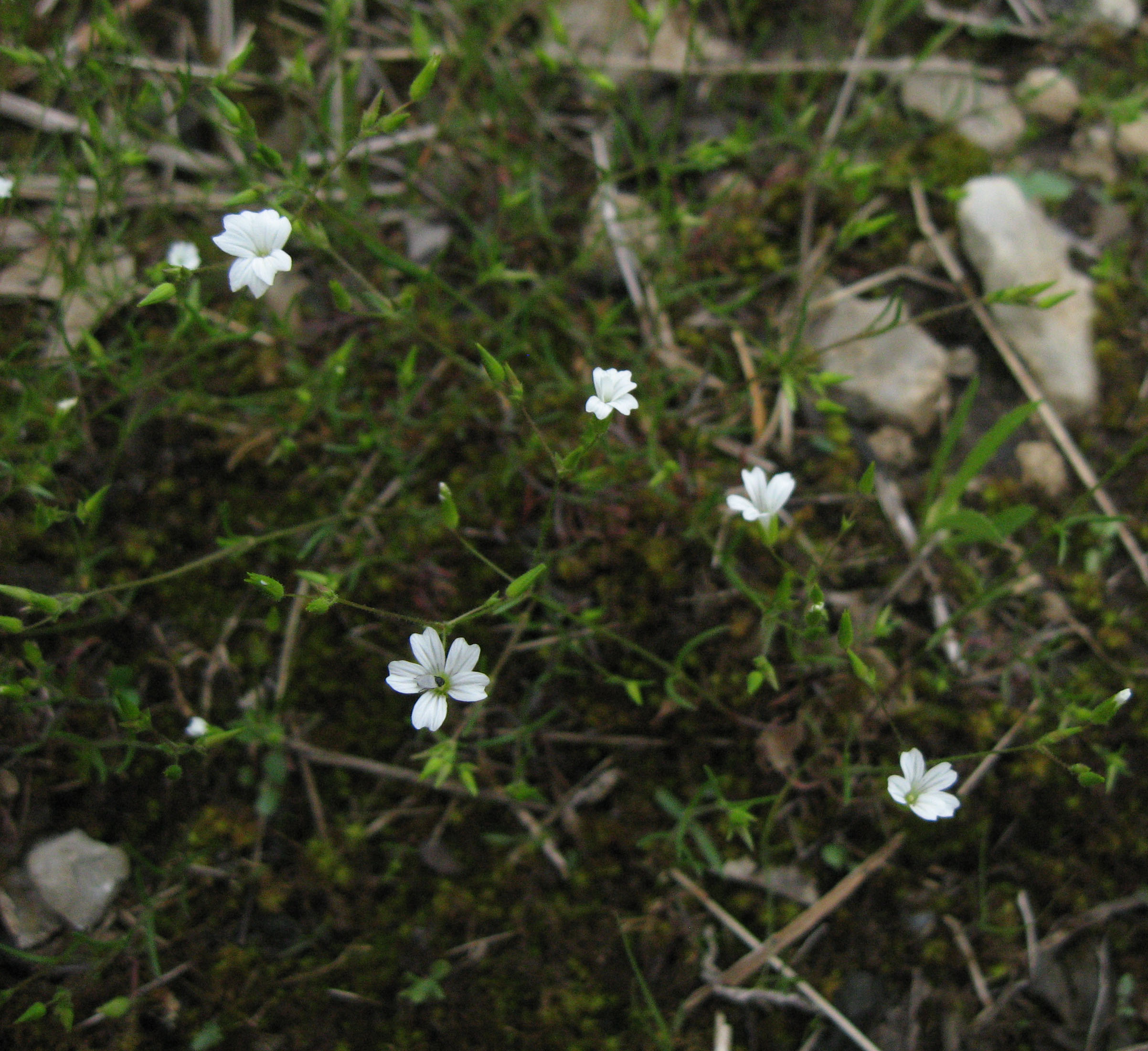
- Minuartia patula

Scientific classification
- Kingdom: Plantae
- Clade: Tracheophytes
- Clade: Angiosperms
- Clade: Eudicots
- Order: Caryophyllales
- Family: Caryophyllaceae
- Genus: Mononeuria; Rchb.

= Mononeuria =

Genus of plants

Mononeuria is a genus of flowering plants belonging to the family Caryophyllaceae.

Its native range is Subarctic America to USA.

== Species ==
Species:

- Mononeuria caroliniana (Walter) Dillenb. & Rabeler
- Mononeuria cumberlandensis (Wofford & R.Kral) Dillenb. & Kadereit
- Mononeuria glabra (Michx.) Dillenb. & Kadereit
- Mononeuria groenlandica (Retz.) Dillenb. & Kadereit
- Mononeuria minima (Mack.) Dillenb. & Kadereit
- Mononeuria muscorum (Fassett) Dillenb. & Kadereit
- Mononeuria nuttallii (Torr. & A.Gray) Dillenb. & Kadereit
- Mononeuria paludicola (Fernald & B.G.Schub.) Dillenb. & Kadereit
- Mononeuria patula (Michx.) Dillenb. & Kadereit
- Mononeuria uniflora (Walter) Dillenb. & Kadereit
