= Sabulina pusilla =

Scientific classification
- Kingdom: Plantae
- Clade: Tracheophytes
- Clade: Angiosperms
- Clade: Eudicots
- Order: Caryophyllales
- Family: Caryophyllaceae
- Genus: Sabulina
- Species: S. pusilla

Binomial name
- Sabulina pusilla (S.Watson) Dillenb. & Kadereit (2014)

Synonyms
- Alsinopsis pusilla (S.Watson) Rydb. (1912); Arenaria pusilla S.Watson (1882); Minuartia pusilla (S.Watson) Mattf. (1921)

Species of flowering plant

Sabulina pusilla is a species of flowering plant in the family Caryophyllaceae known by the common names annual sandwort and dwarf stitchwort.

It is native to western North America from British Columbia to southern California to Utah, from sea level to 2,400 metres (7,900 ft). It grows in mountain pine forests, chaparral, plains, and other habitats.

== Description ==
Sabulina pusilla is a petite annual herb producing a slender, erect stem no more than 5 centimeters tall. The tiny green concave leaves are thready to lance-shaped, up to 5 millimeters long and no more than 1.5 millimeters wide.

The tiny flower has five pointed sepals just a few millimeters long. There may be five white petals which are roughly the same length as the sepals or slightly smaller, though sometimes the flowers lack petals.
