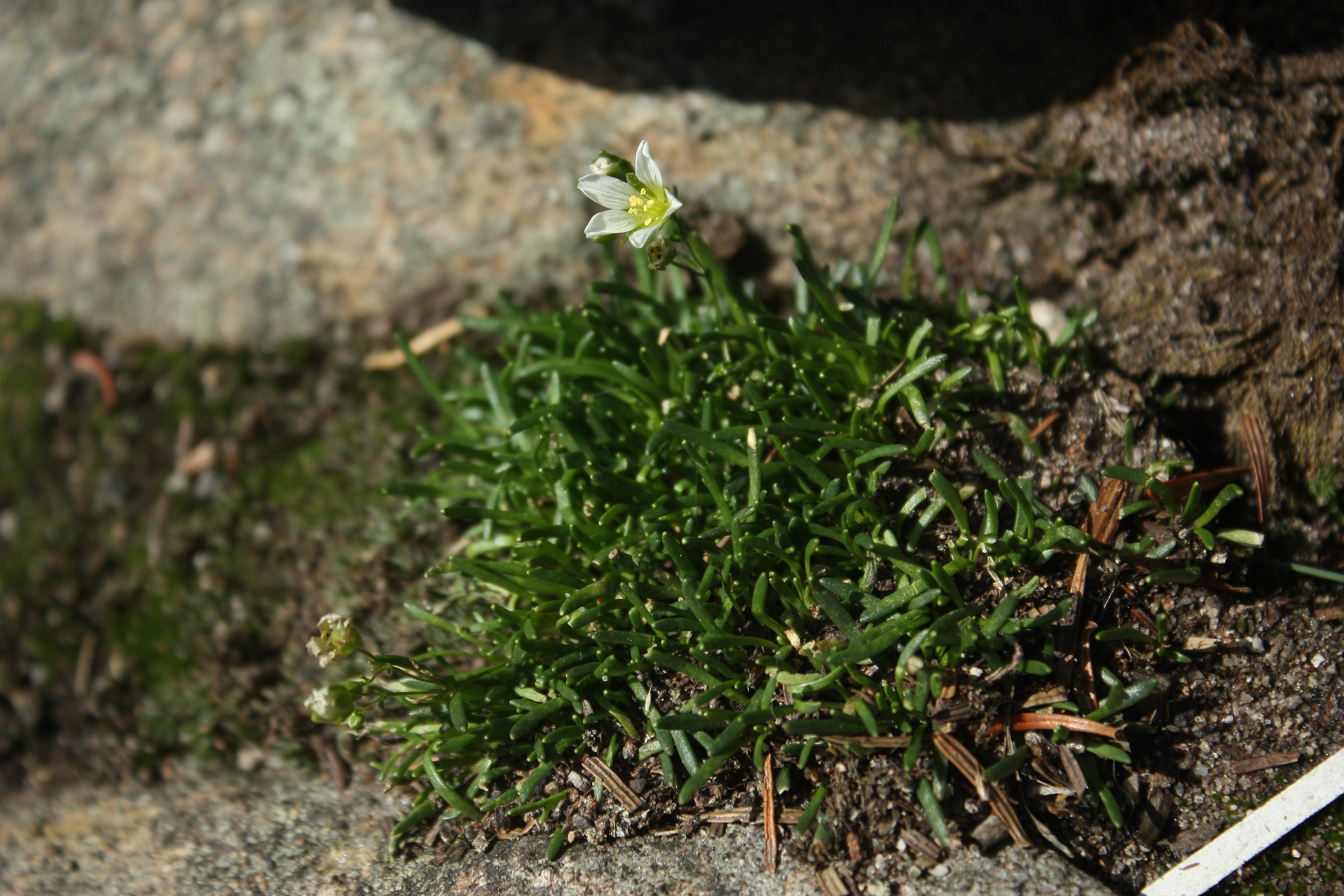
- Geocarpon groenlandicum in Adirondacks Park, New York state

Scientific classification
- Kingdom: Plantae
- Clade: Tracheophytes
- Clade: Angiosperms
- Clade: Eudicots
- Order: Caryophyllales
- Family: Caryophyllaceae
- Genus: Geocarpon
- Species: G. groenlandicum

Binomial name
- Geocarpon groenlandicum (Retz.) E.E.Schill. (2022)

Synonyms
- Alsine groenlandica (Retz.) Fenzl (1833); Alsinopsis groenlandica (Retz.) Small (1903); Arenaria glabra Torr. (1824), nom. illeg.; Arenaria groenlandica (Retz.) Spreng. (1825); Minuartia groenlandica (Retz.) Ostenf. (1920); Mononeuria groenlandica (Retz.) Dillenb. & Kadereit (2014); Porsildia groenlandica (Retz.) Á.Löve & D.Löve (1975 publ. 1976); Sabularia groenlandica (Retz.) Small (1933); Sabulina groenlandica (Retz.) Small (1933); Stellaria groenlandica Retz. (1795) – basionym; Stellaria labradorica Schrank (1818)

= Geocarpon groenlandicum =

Species of flowering plant

Geocarpon groenlandicum, the Greenland stitchwort or mountain stitchwort, Appalachian stitchwort, mountain sandwort, smooth mountain sandwort, and smooth sandwort is a rare perennial which grows low to the ground in clumps linked together at the bottom. It has three to five pairs of leaves in a linear opposite pattern along the length of the slender stem. The main stem breaks into one to thirty cymes which each flower separately. The flowers are white and arise five to ten centimeters above the thick foliage. The white flower petals are six to ten millimeters long. The petals are, in turn, surrounded by five green sepals.

The plant exists in many isolated and elevated areas, such as large mountain plateaus. Its range of distribution includes Nunavut, Ontario, Quebec, Newfoundland and Labrador, and Nova Scotia in Canada. In the United States it is found in Maine, New Hampshire, Vermont, New York, West Virginia, Maryland, Virginia, Tennessee, North Carolina, and South Carolina. It is also found in Greenland. Within Nova Scotia this plant is found in Inverness County and along the south shore in only a few areas.

The plant has a peak flowering time of two weeks in the middle of July, although it does flower anywhere between June and August. In this period pollen grains are transported from flower to flower by insects. The most effective insect to transport pollen grains is the bumblebee Bombus terricola. This is due to tiny hairs on the bee that collect pollen, and the bee's habit of crawling all over the flower in low temperatures when it is too cold to fly.

Greenland stitchwort is found in areas of high elevation where bedrock is exposed. The plant grows on rocky ledges and in fine gravel on slopes. The soil in this area has a pH of 3.1 to 4, and is low in nitrogen and phosphorus, but high in organic matter content. This region is very cloudy, has frequent fog and considerable precipitation. One study area on Mount Washington recorded an annual precipitation average at 1837.5 millimeters, an average wind speed of 50 km/h, and a mean annual temperature of -3.0 °C.

Geocarpon groenlandicum was studied for use on roof tops for insulation and urban greenery but was unable to tolerate drought for long enough to be used successfully.

In Nova Scotia the Greenland stitchwort is sensitive to interference by humans and natural events. The conservation status in Nova Scotia is yellow.

== Conservation status within the United States ==
It is listed as endangered in Connecticut, and Maryland, as threatened in Kentucky, New Hampshire, New York (state), Pennsylvania, and Rhode Island, and as a special concern in Maine.
