= Aurantiosporium =

Scientific classification
- Kingdom: Fungi
- Division: Basidiomycota
- Class: Microbotryomycetes
- Order: Microbotryales
- Family: Ustilentylomataceae
- Genus: Aurantiosporium; M. Piepenbr., Vánky & Oberw. 1996

Species
- Aurantiosporium colombianum Aurantiosporium marisci Aurantiosporium pallidum Aurantiosporium scleriae Aurantiosporium subnitens

Genus of fungi

Aurantiosporium is a genus of fungi found in the family Microbotryaceae. It contains 5 species.
