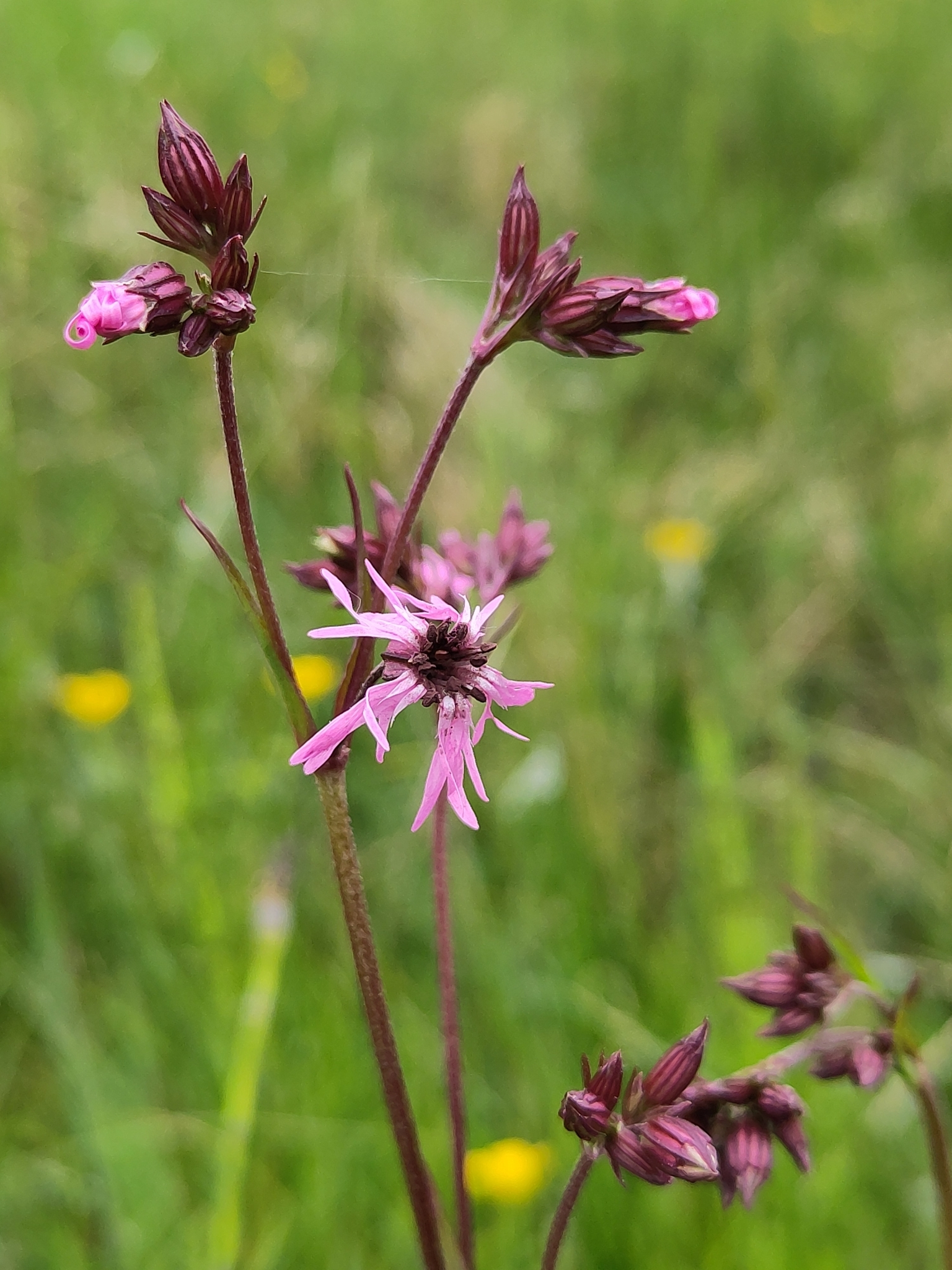
- Flowers of Silene flos-cuculi infected with Microbotryum coronariae.

Scientific classification
- Kingdom: Fungi
- Division: Basidiomycota
- Class: Microbotryomycetes
- Order: Microbotryales
- Family: Microbotryaceae
- Genus: Microbotryum
- Species: M. coronariae

Binomial name
- Microbotryum coronariae (Liro) Denchev, 2011

Synonyms
- Ustilago coronariae Liro, 1924

= Microbotryum coronariae =

Species of smut fungus

Microbotryum coronariae is a smut fungus that infects Silene flos-cuculi. It produces brownish-violet spores in the host plant's anthers. It occurs in Northern Europe, from Ireland east to Russia.
