= Fulvisporium =

Scientific classification
- Kingdom: Fungi
- Division: Basidiomycota
- Class: Microbotryomycetes
- Order: Microbotryales
- Family: Ustilentylomataceae
- Genus: Fulvisporium; Vánky 1997
- Species: F. restifaciens

Binomial name
- Fulvisporium restifaciens (D.E. Shaw) Vánky 1997

Genus of fungi

Fulvisporium is a monotypic genus of fungi found in the family Microbotryaceae. It contains the sole species Fulvisporium restifaciens, a smut fungus found in Australia.
