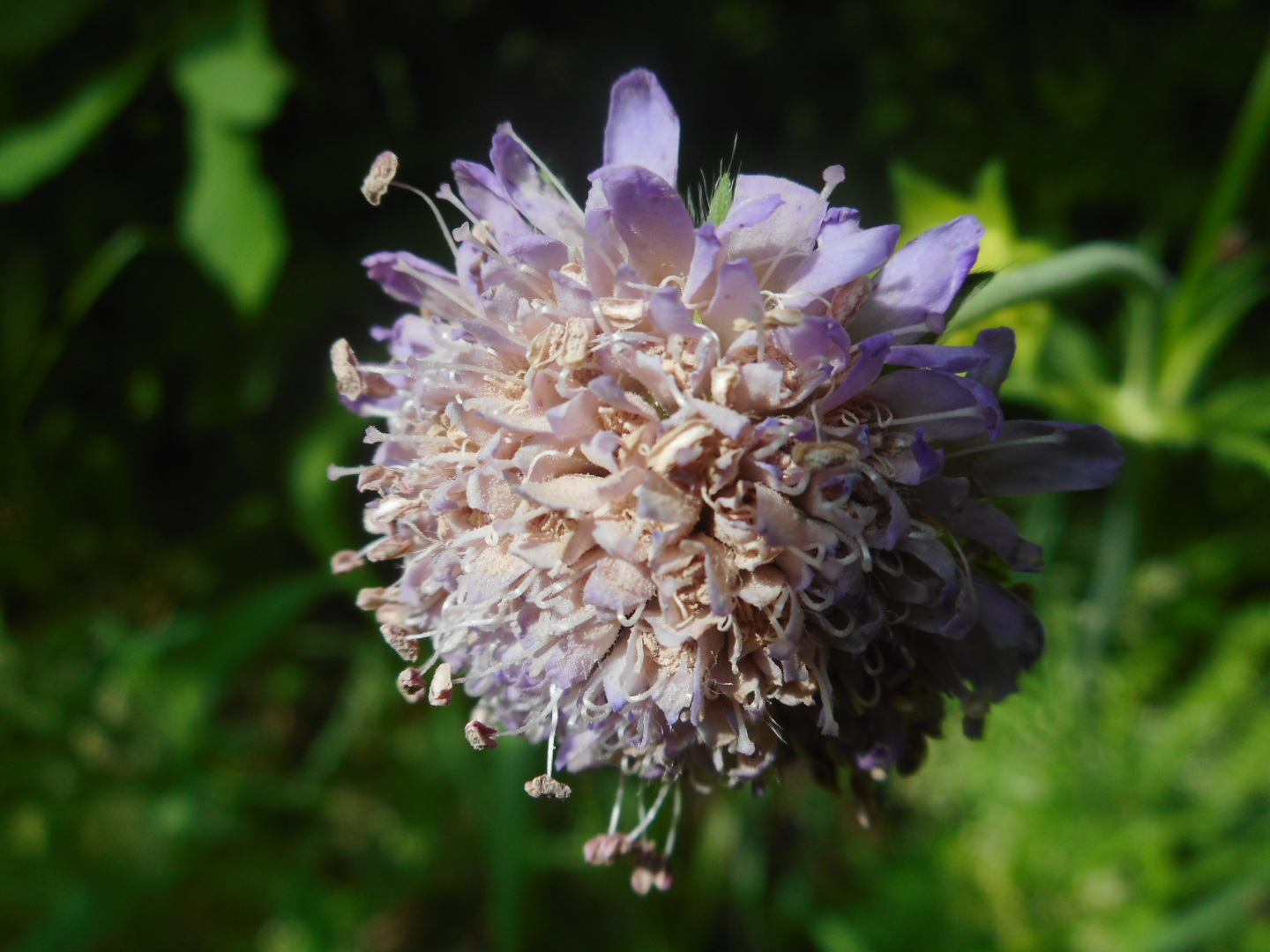
- A flower head of a Knautia species infected with Microbotryum scabiosae.

Scientific classification
- Kingdom: Fungi
- Division: Basidiomycota
- Class: Microbotryomycetes
- Order: Microbotryales
- Family: Microbotryaceae
- Genus: Microbotryum
- Species: M. scabiosae

Binomial name
- Microbotryum scabiosae (Sowerby) Deml & Prillinger 1991

Synonyms
- Bauhinus scabiosae (Sowerby) Moore, 1992; Ustilago scabiosae (Sowerby) Deml & Prillinger, 1991

= Microbotryum scabiosae =

Species of smut fungus

Microbotryum scabiosae is a smut fungus that infects plants in the genus Knautia. It produces pale ochraceous spores in the host plant's anthers.
