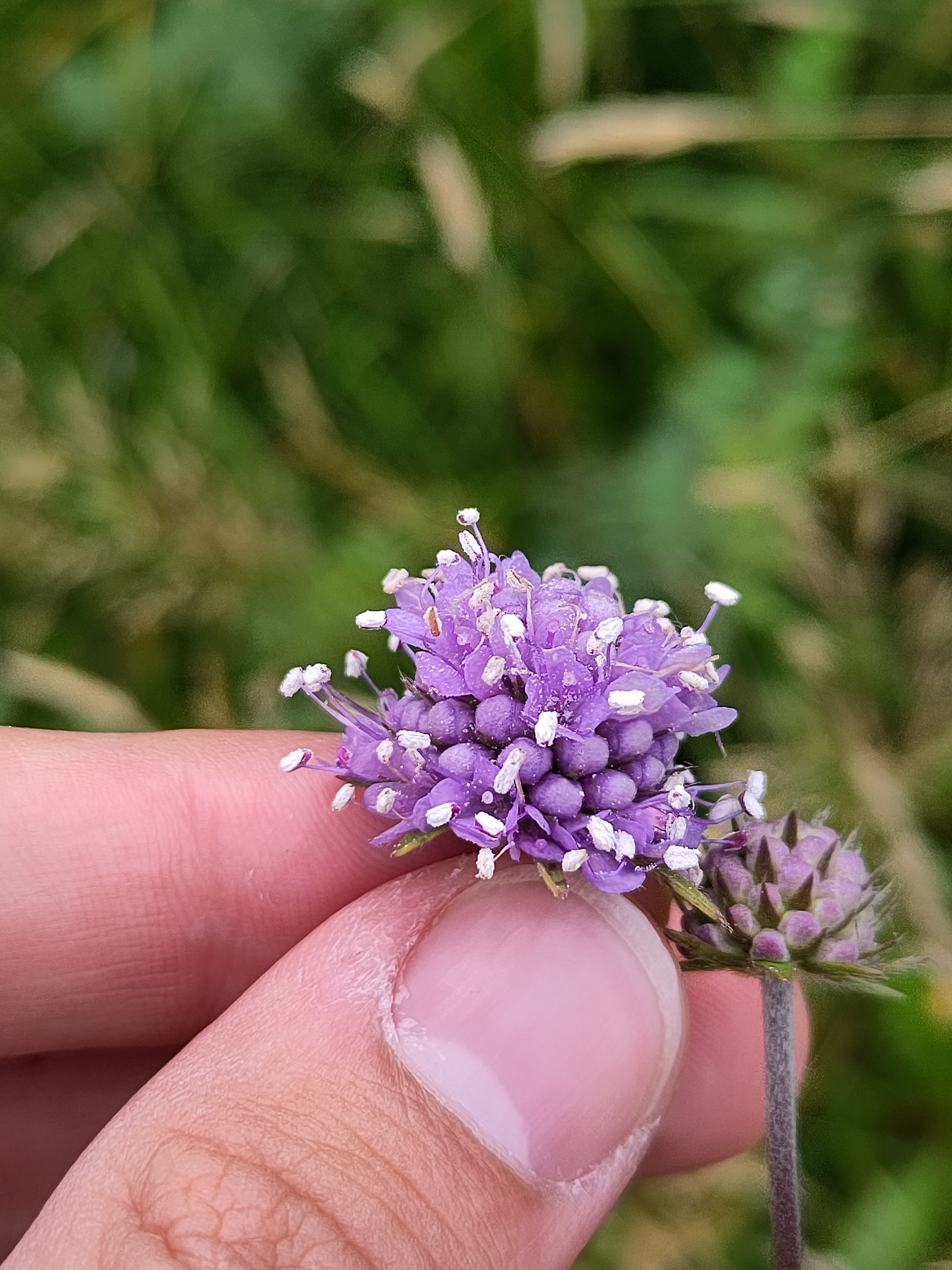
- A flower head of devil's-bit scabious (Succisa pratensis) infected with Microbotryum succisae.

Scientific classification
- Kingdom: Fungi
- Division: Basidiomycota
- Class: Microbotryomycetes
- Order: Microbotryales
- Family: Microbotryaceae
- Genus: Microbotryum
- Species: M. succisae

Binomial name
- Microbotryum succisae (Magnus) Bauer & Oberwinkler, 1997

Synonyms
- Ustilago succisae Magnus, 1875

= Microbotryum succisae =

Smut fungus

Microbotryum succisae is a smut fungus that infects the devil's-bit scabious, Succisa pratensis. It produces whitish to pale yellow spores in the host plant's anthers.
