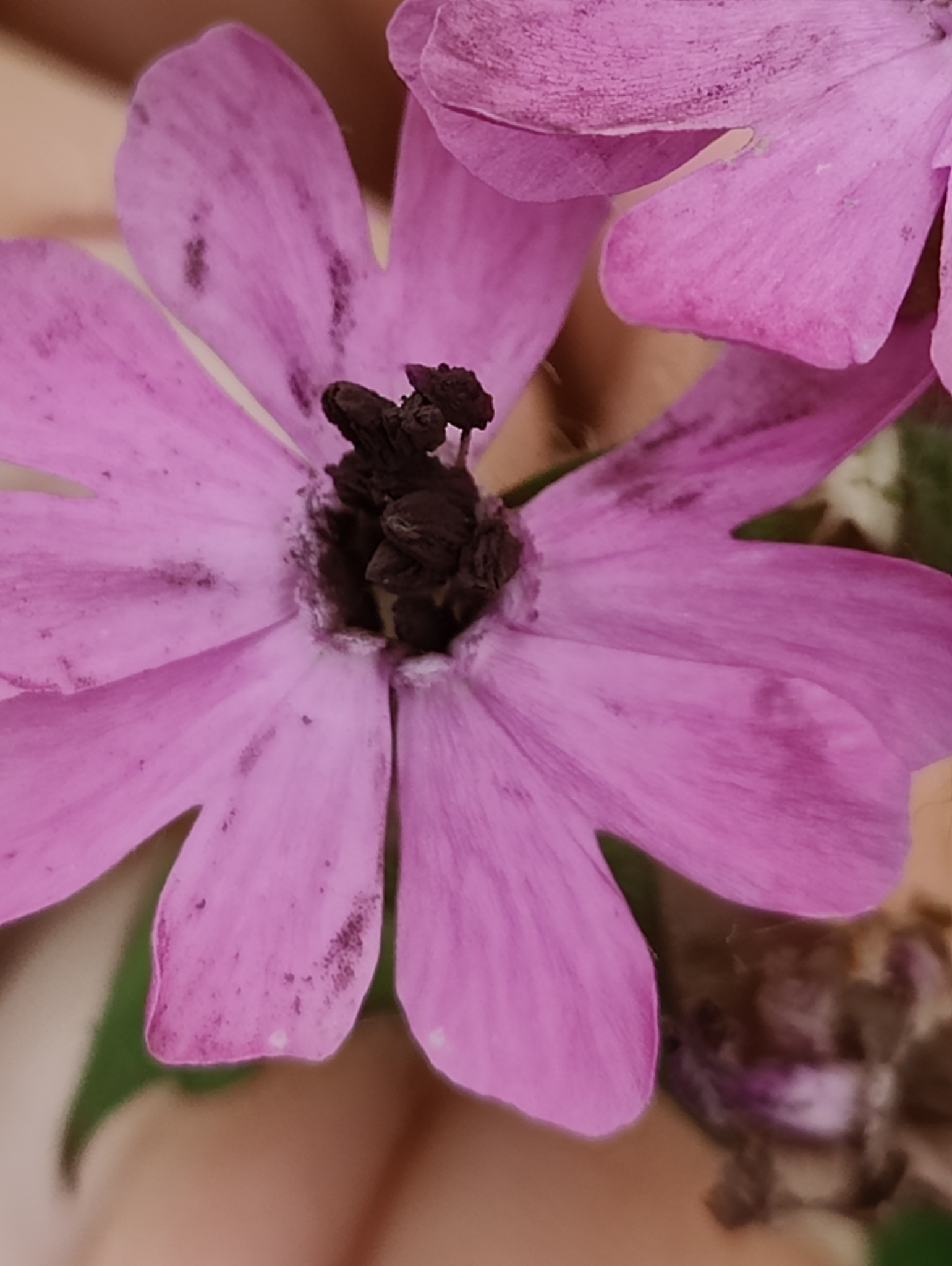

Scientific classification
- Kingdom: Fungi
- Division: Basidiomycota
- Class: Microbotryomycetes
- Order: Microbotryales
- Family: Microbotryaceae
- Genus: Microbotryum
- Species: M. silenes-dioicae

Binomial name
- Microbotryum silenes-dioicae Giraud, Denchev & Hood, 2009

= Microbotryum silenes-dioicae =

Species of fungus

Microbotryum silenes-dioicae is a species of fungus first isolated from Brittany, France. Its name refers to its host species, Silene dioica. The fungus is the cause of anther-smut disease, which results in fungal spores replacing the pollen in the anthers. The species that most resembles ‘’M. silenes-dioicae’’ morphologically is M. lychnidis-dioicae.

== Description ==
This species shows sori arranged in anthers. Its spore mass is powdery and brown. The spores are mainly globose, subglobose or ellipsoidal, measuring 6.5–10.5 by 5.5–9.0 μm and being pale coloured. The spore wall is reticulate, presenting 6–8 meshes per spore diameter, the latter being irregularly polygonal.

== In culture ==
In 1869, the English suffragette Lydia Becker presented to the British Association for the Advancement of Science her theory that the fungus causes female flowers of its host to become hermaphroditic, informing her later work in gender studies.
