= Liroa =

Scientific classification
- Kingdom: Fungi
- Division: Basidiomycota
- Class: Microbotryomycetes
- Order: Microbotryales
- Family: Microbotryaceae
- Genus: Liroa; Cif. 1933
- Species: L. emodensis

Binomial name
- Liroa emodensis (Berk.) Cif. 1933

Genus of fungi

Liroa is a monotypic genus of fungi found in the family Microbotryaceae. It contains the single species Liroa emodensis, common name Microbotryum emodensis.

The genus name of Liroa is in honour of Johan Ivar Lindroth (1872-1943), who was a Finnish botanist (Mycology) and phytopathologist.

The genus was circumscribed by Raffaele Ciferri in Nuovo Giorn. Bot. Ital. ser.2, vol.40 on page 263 in 1933.
