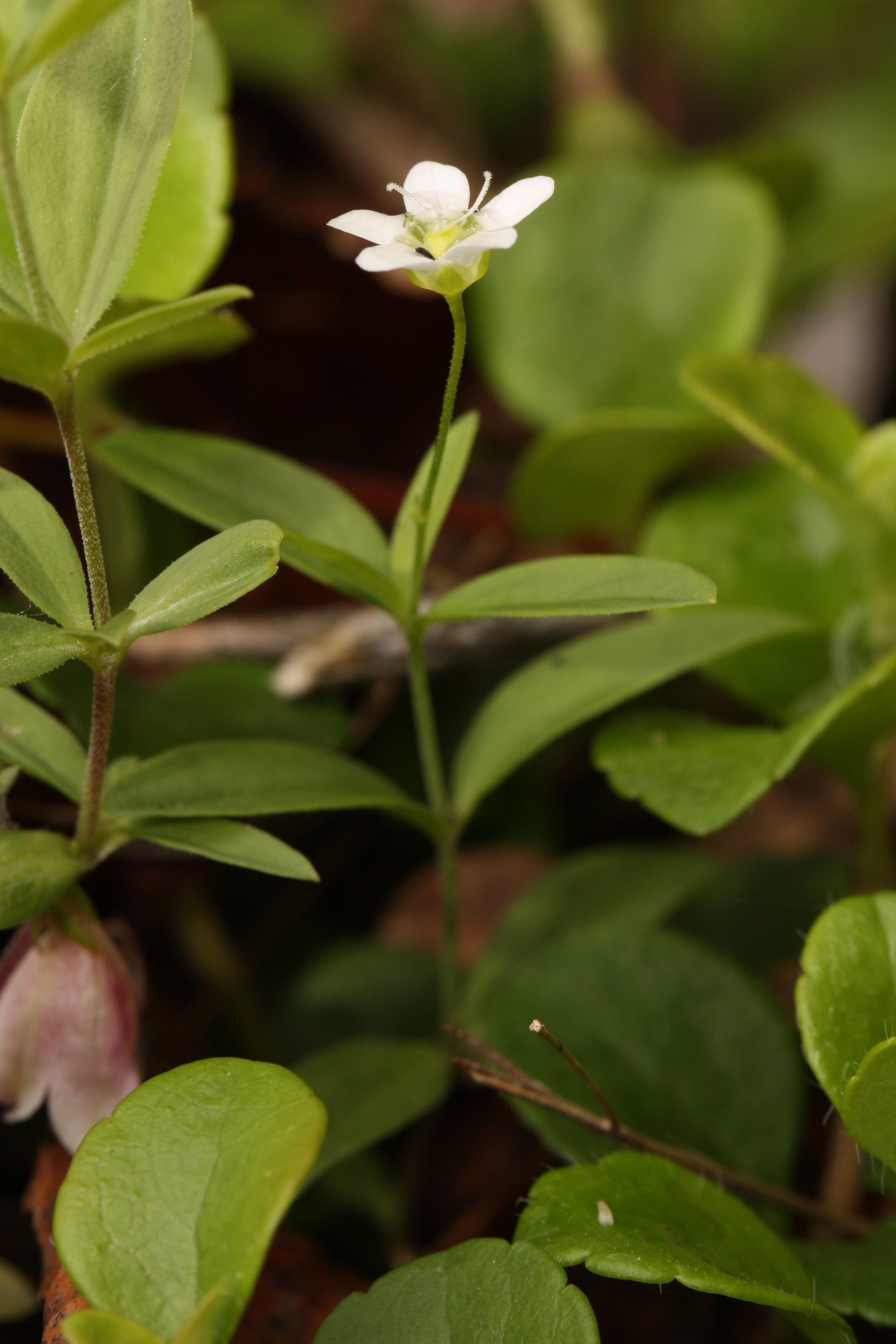

Conservation status
- Secure (NatureServe)

Scientific classification
- Kingdom: Plantae
- Clade: Embryophytes
- Clade: Tracheophytes
- Clade: Angiosperms
- Clade: Eudicots
- Order: Caryophyllales
- Family: Caryophyllaceae
- Genus: Moehringia
- Species: M. lateriflora

Binomial name
- Moehringia lateriflora (L.) Fenzl

Synonyms
- Synonyms (16): Alsinanthus lateriflorus (L.) Desv.; Alsine lateriflora (L.) Crantz; Arenaria buxifolia Poir.; Arenaria haenkeana Bartl.; Arenaria lateriflora L.; Arenaria lateriflora var. angustifolia H. St. John; Arenaria lateriflora var. tayloriae H. St. John; Arenaria lateriflora var. tenuicaulis Blankinship; Arenaria lateriflora var. typica H. St. John; Arenaria pensylvanica Muhl.; Moehringia elongata Schischk.; Moehringia lateriflora var. angustifolia Regel; Moehringia lateriflora var. elongata (Schischk.) Vorosch.; Moehringia lateriflora var. glabrescens Regel; Moehringia lateriflora var. intermedia Regel; Stellaria biflora Pursh

= Moehringia lateriflora =

Species of flowering plant

Moehringia lateriflora, commonly known as the blunt-leaf sandwort, is a plant species in the Alsinoideae subfamily of the carnation family, Caryophyllaceae. It is a small perennial herb that grows in a variety of habitats and is native to much of the Northern Hemisphere, including northern and eastern Europe, Asia, the northern United States, and most of Canada. As with other members of its genus, M. lateriflora has spongy appendages on its seeds, called elaiosomes, that attract ants, which help with its dispersal. It is also a host to several fungal pathogens, including an undescribed species of anther smut spread from flower to flower by pollinating insects.

== Description ==
Moehringia lateriflora is a perennial herb spreading by means of underground rhizomes, often forming large colonies. The stems are erect or decumbent, branched, and 5–30 cm long, with circular cross-sections. Retrorse (downward-pointing) hairs cover the stem. The leaves are arranged in opposite pairs along the stem, attached on very short petioles 0.1–1 mm long. Each leaf has one to three veins and is elliptic or oblong with a rounded or obtuse tip, measuring 6–40 mm long and 5–10 mm wide. The leaf margins are covered in small hairs, and the leaf veins are hairy near the base of the leaf.

Flowers occur singly or in groups of two to five arranged in cymes at the tip of the stem. Each flower is held on an upward-facing pedicel 3–30 mm long and is subtended by a pair of small, thin bracts. The flowers are pentamerous, with five sepals and five petals. The sepals, arranged below the petals, are ovate and 1.7–2.8 mm long, and the petals are white and generally twice as long as the sepals. Each flower has ten white-tipped stamens and a green ovary with three styles. The flowers are not fragrant.

The fruit is a round capsule with a diameter of 3–5 mm. It has six teeth near its tip and six chambers. When dry, the fruit breaks open to release between two and six seeds, which are black or brown, smooth, kidney-shaped, and approximately 1 mm long. The seeds have small, spongy appendages, called elaisomes, that attract ants which aid seed dispersal.

== Distribution ==
Moehringia lateriflora has a wide holarctic distribution. In North America, it has been reported from Saint Pierre and Miquelon, every province and territory in Canada except the Northwest Territories, and the northern half of the United States, extending southward to New Mexico. Its distribution across Asia includes Russia, Korea, Mongolia, Japan, Kazakhstan, and nine provinces across northern China. In Europe, M. lateriflora is native to Finland, Sweden, Norway, Latvia, Estonia, Lithuania, Belarus, Ukraine, and European Russia.

Moehringia lateriflora grows in both upland and wetland habitats in partial to full shade. It occurs in meadows, shores of rivers or lakes, forest margins, and both moist and dry woodlands. Its elevational range is 50–2700 m.

== Ecology ==
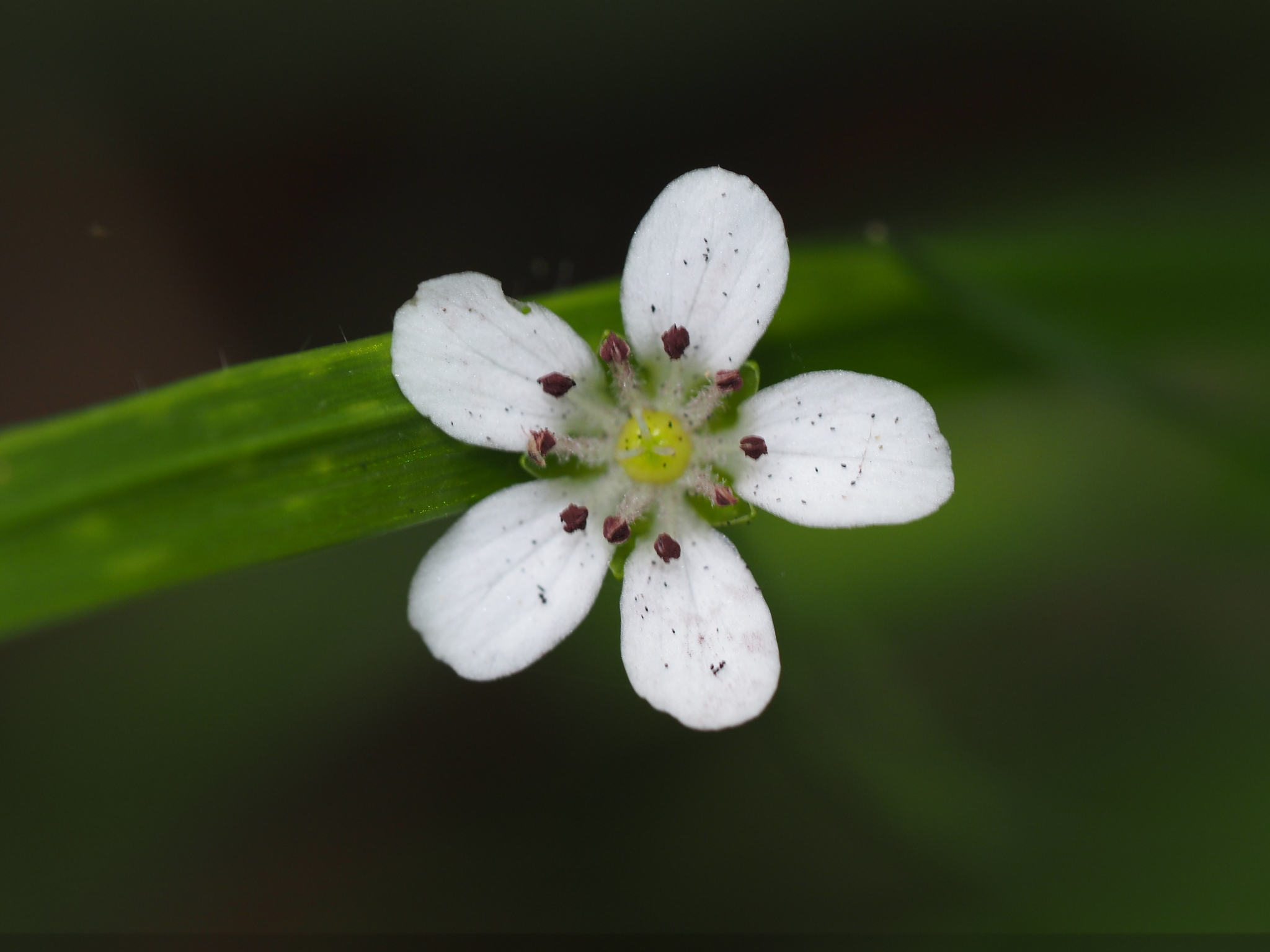
Anther smut infections are characterized by darkened, sterilized anthers, where the fungus produces spores.

=== Insect associations ===
Moehringia lateriflora is pollinated by insects, including bees, flies, and wasps. Like other members of its genus, its seeds have spongy appendages called elaiosomes that attract ants. The ants carry the seeds into their underground nests and eat the elaisomes but not the seeds; in this way, the ants act as dispersal vectors for the plant, a process known as myrmecochory. Water dispersal has also been proposed as the primary seed transport mechanism for M. lateriflora, inferred from its occurrence in fluvial habitats.

=== Fungal associations ===
A species of smut fungus in the genus Microbotryum, known as an anther smut fungus, infects M. lateriflora. It sterilizes the flowers and produces dark masses of spores on the anthers, which pollinators spread by visiting other flowers. This undescribed species of smut fungus has historically been considered part of the Microbotryum violaceum species complex and has been referred to as Microbotryum violaceum lateriflora. A 2020 survey of iNaturalist observations found that 2.592% of M. lateriflora images uploaded to the site showed infection by anther smut, a rate significantly higher than other members of the Arenarieae tribe.

In Japan, the rust fungus Uromyces moehringiae has been documented infecting the plant's leaves. Like many rust fungi, this species is host-specific and is known only to infect M. lateriflora. Infection by U. moehringiae produces powdery, yellow-brown pustules, usually on the lower leaf surfaces, from which the fungus releases its spores. Three other rust fungi are known to infect M. lateriflora in North America. Infections by Puccinia arenariae were reported in Maine and Saskatchewan, and infection by Uromyces acuminatus var. spartinae was reported in Nova Scotia.

The mycologist Pier Andrea Saccardo described a new variety of cup fungus growing on dead leaves of M. lateriflora in Yakutat Bay as Pseudopeziza cerastiorum var. arenariae in 1926. That name is now considered a synonym of Leptotrochila cerastiorum.

== Taxonomy ==
Carl Linnaeus first described Moehringia lateriflora in his 1753 work Species Plantarum based on a specimen from Siberia. He named the species Arenaria lateriflora. In 1766, Crantz placed the species in the genus Alsine, and in 1813, Desvaux placed it in Alsinanthus. At the same time as Linnaeus described Arenaria lateriflora, he also named the genus Moehringia, including in it only the species Moehringia muscosa; in 1833, Fenzl placed Arenaria lateriflora in the genus Moehringia. Over the course of the nineteenth and early twentieth centuries M. lateriflora accumulated a long list of taxonomic synonyms.

McNeill revised the classification of the subfamily Alsinoideae, arguing that M. lateriflora and other closely-related species with strophioles on their seeds should be placed in Moehringia, an interpretation supported by Bittrich's treatment of the genus Caryophyllaceae in 1993. Currently, taxonomic authorities including Flora of North America, Flora of China, and Plants of the World Online (POWO) accept the name Moehringia lateriflora.

According to POWO Moehringia lateriflora has 16 synonyms.

Table of Synonyms
| Name | Year | Rank | Notes |
|---|---|---|---|
| Alsinanthus lateriflorus (L.) Desv. | 1816 | species | ≡ hom. |
| Alsine lateriflora (L.) Crantz | 1766 | species | ≡ hom. |
| Arenaria buxifolia Poir. | 1804 | species | = het. |
| Arenaria haenkeana Bartl. | 1831 | species | = het. |
| Arenaria lateriflora L. | 1753 | species | ≡ hom. |
| Arenaria lateriflora var. angustifolia H.St.John | 1917 | variety | = het. |
| Arenaria lateriflora var. tayloriae H.St.John | 1917 | variety | = het. |
| Arenaria lateriflora var. tenuicaulis Blank. | 1905 | variety | = het. |
| Arenaria lateriflora var. typica H.St.John | 1917 | variety | = het., not validly publ. |
| Arenaria pensylvanica Muhl. | 1793 | species | = het., nom. nud. |
| Moehringia elongata Schischk. | 1936 | species | = het. |
| Moehringia lateriflora var. angustifolia Regel | 1862 | variety | = het. |
| Moehringia lateriflora var. elongata (Schischk.) Vorosch. | 1985 | variety | = het. |
| Moehringia lateriflora var. glabrescens Regel | 1862 | variety | = het. |
| Moehringia lateriflora var. intermedia Regel | 1862 | variety | = het. |
| Stellaria biflora Pursh | 1813 | species | = het., nom. illeg. homonym. post. |
Notes: ≡ homotypic synonym; = heterotypic synonym

Common names in English for M. lateriflora include grove sandwort and blunt-leaf sandwort (also spelled blunt-leaved sandwort or bluntleaf sandwort).
