= Ustilentyloma =

Scientific classification
- Kingdom: Fungi
- Division: Basidiomycota
- Class: Microbotryomycetes
- Order: Microbotryales
- Family: Ustilentylomataceae
- Genus: Ustilentyloma; Savile

Genus of fungi

Ustilentyloma is a genus of fungi found in the family Ustilentylomataceae.

There are five species assigned to this genus:

- Ustilentyloma brefeldii (Krieg.) Vánky
- Ustilentyloma fluitans (Liro) Vánky
- Ustilentyloma graminis (Rodr.Mir. & H.G.Diem) Q.M.Wang, F.Y.Bai, M.Groenew. & Boekhout
- Ustilentyloma oreochloae (Durrieu) Vánky
- Ustilentyloma pleuropogonis Savile
