= George Lorenzo Zundel =

American mycologist and phycologist

George Lorenzo Ingram Zundel (Brigham City, Utah, December 23, 1885 – March 10, 1950) was an American mycologist, phycologist, and plant pathologist.

== Biography ==
He studied at Brigham Young University in 1909, and afterwards at the Agricultural College of Utah (now Utah State University), where in 1911, he received a degree. He taught botany at the university, and middle school biology in Brigham City. In 1913 he moved to New York and two years later received a M.Sc. from Cornell University. In 1926 he began studying at Yale University; where he defended a doctoral thesis, dedicated to Ustilaginomycetes. From 1928 to 1946, he worked at the University of Pennsylvania, and then retired for health reasons. Zundel died March 10, 1950, in Brigham City.

== Some publications ==
The standard author abbreviation Zundel is used to indicate this person as the author when citing a botanical name.

- 1937. Raspberry Disease Control

=== Books ===
- 1939. (Ustilaginales): Additions and Corrections. North American Flora 7, splits 14. With John Hendley Barnhart. Ed. New York Botanical Garden, 75 pp.
- 1938. The Ustilaginales of South Africa
- 1938. To New Smut from Southern Chile
- 1937. Miscellaneous Notice on the Ustilaginales

== Honors ==
=== Eponymy ===
Genus

- Zundeliomyces Vánky, 1987
- Zundelula Thirum. & Naras., 1952 without. Dermatosorus Sawada, 1949

Species

- Sorosporium zundelianum Cif., 1933 without. Sporisorium tembuti (Henn. & Pole-Evans) Vánky, 2007
- Sphacelotheca zundelii Hirschh., 1986, nom. inval.
- Sporisorium zundelianum Vánky, 1995
- Tilletiazundelii Hirschh., 1943
