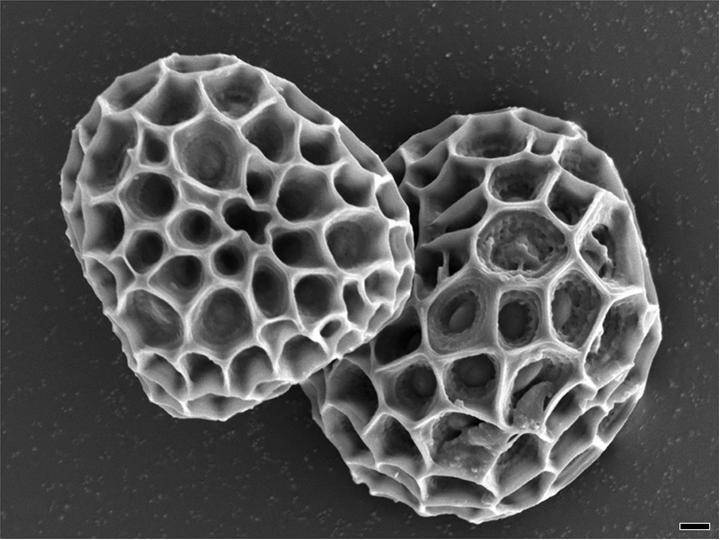
- Two spores of B. vuyckii, each some 14 μm across

Scientific classification
- Kingdom: Fungi
- Division: Basidiomycota
- Class: Microbotryomycetes
- Order: Microbotryales
- Family: Microbotryaceae
- Genus: Bauerago; Vánky 1999

Species
- See text.

= Bauerago =

Genus of fungi

Bauerago is a genus of fungi found in the family Microbotryaceae. It contained 9 species before being reduced to 5 species.

The genus name of Bauerago is in honour of Robert Bauer (1950–2014), who was a German mycologist, specialising in rust (Uredinales) and smut (Ustilaginomycetes) fungi.

The genus was circumscribed by Kálmán Géza Vánky in Mycotaxon vol.70 on pages 44 and 46 in 1999.

== Species ==
As accepted by Species Fungorum;

- Bauerago abstrusa (Malençon) Vánky (1999)
- Bauerago capensis (Reess) Vánky (1999)
- Bauerago cyperi-lucidi (J. Walker) Vánky
- Bauerago gardneri (McKenzie & Vánky) Vánky (1999)
- Bauerago vuyckii (Oudem. & Beij.) Vánky (1999)

Former species;

- B. boliviana M. Piepenbr. (2002) = Kalmanago boliviana
- B. combensis (Vánky) Denchev (2003) = Kalmanago combensis
- B. commelinae (Kom.) Denchev (2003) = Kalmanago commelinae
- B. tinantiae (J.C. Lindq.) Vánky (2009) = Kalmanago tinantiae
