= Paul Möhring =

German naturalist (1710–1792)

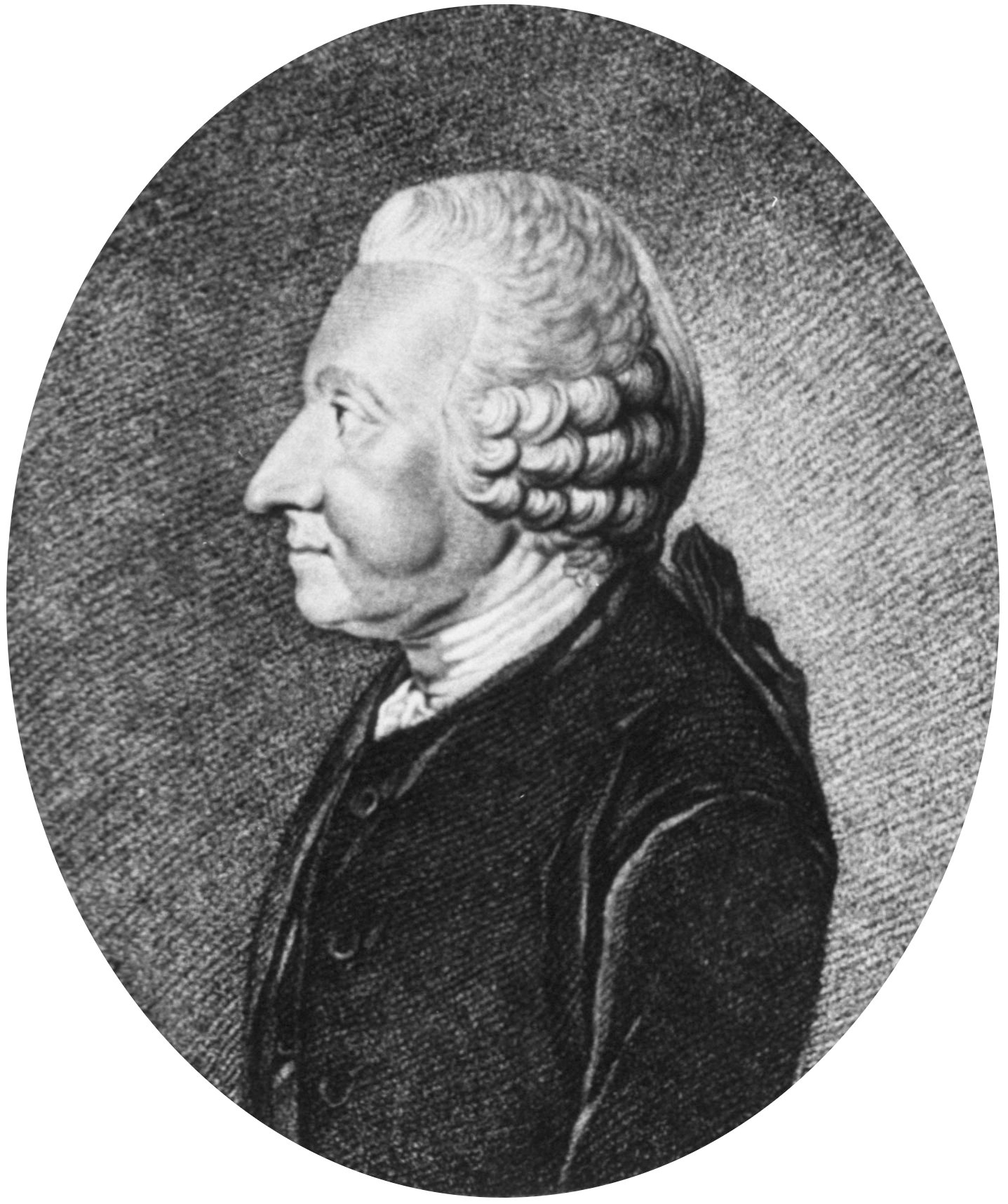
- Portrait of Möhring, 1782
- Born: Paul Heinrich Gerhard Möhring; 21 July 1710; Jever, Lower Saxony, Germany
- Died: 28 October 1792 (aged 82); Jever, Lower Saxony
- Other name: Paul Mohr
- Education: Danzig, Wittenberg
- Known for: Avium Genera, an early attempt to classify bird species
- Scientific career
- Fields: Physician, botanist, zoologist
- Author abbrev. (botany): Möhring

Paul Heinrich Gerhard Möhring (also Paul Mohr; 21 July 1710 in Jever – 28 October 1792) was a German physician, botanist and zoologist.

He studied medicine in Danzig and Wittenberg, and following graduation (1733), he settled as a general practitioner in his hometown of Jever. Möhring was a physician to the Prince of Anhalt. In 1752 he published Avium Genera, an early attempt to classify bird species, which divided birds into four classes and shows the beginnings of the modern groupings.

During his long career, he maintained correspondence with Albrecht von Haller, Lorenz Heister, Carl Linnaeus, Hans Sloane and Paul Gottlieb Werlhof. The plant genus Moehringia (family Caryophyllaceae) was named in his honor by Carl Linnaeus.

== Principal works ==
- "De inflammationis sanguineae theoria mechanica", 1733.
- "Historiae medicinales", 1739.
- "Avium genera", 1752.
- Geslachten der Vogelen 1758.
