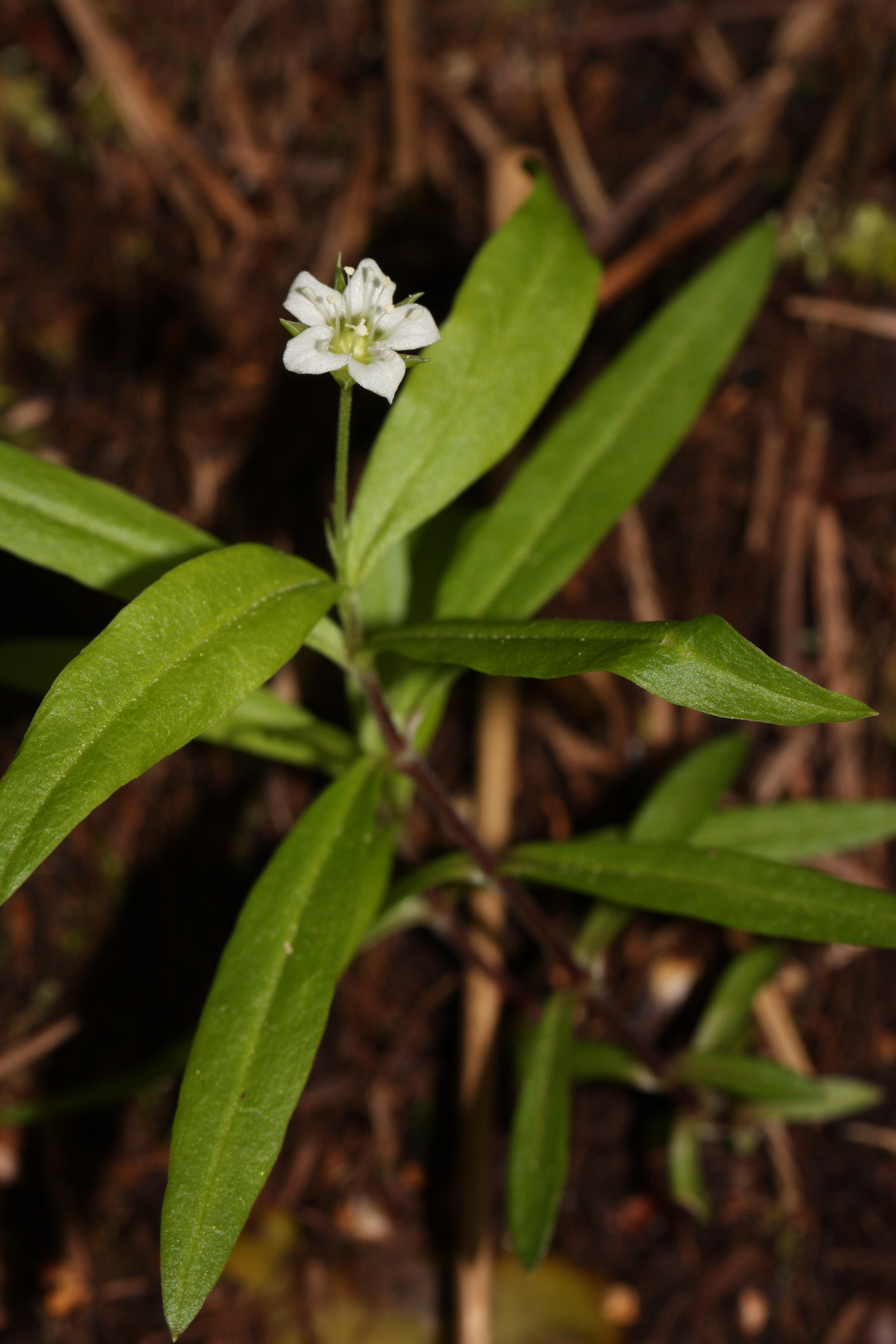

Conservation status
- Secure (NatureServe)

Scientific classification
- Kingdom: Plantae
- Clade: Tracheophytes
- Clade: Angiosperms
- Clade: Eudicots
- Order: Caryophyllales
- Family: Caryophyllaceae
- Genus: Moehringia
- Species: M. macrophylla

Binomial name
- Moehringia macrophylla (Hook.) Fenzl

= Moehringia macrophylla =

Species of flowering plant

Moehringia macrophylla, commonly known as the largeleaf sandwort, is a species of flowering plant in the family Caryophyllaceae. It is native to parts of eastern and western North America, where it can be found in moist, shady habitat types, such as mountain forests. It is a rhizomatous perennial herb growing erect to about 18 centimeters in maximum height. The lance-shaped leaves are up to 5 centimeters long and oppositely arranged about the stem. The inflorescence is a cyme of 2 to 5 flowers, each with 5 pointed green sepals and 5 rounded white petals. The fruit is a toothed black capsule.
