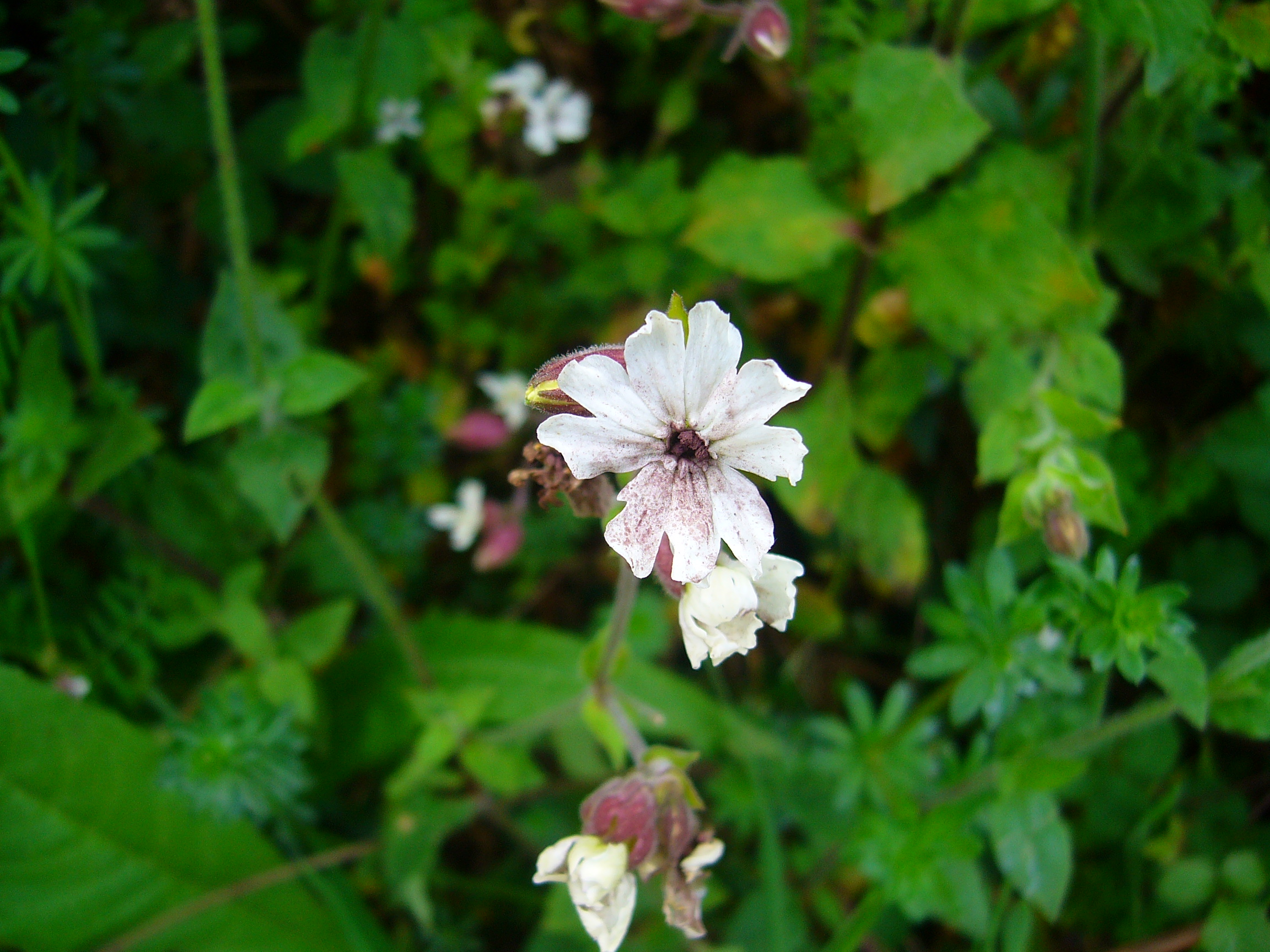
- Microbotryum violaceum on Silene alba

Scientific classification
- Kingdom: Fungi
- Division: Basidiomycota
- Class: Microbotryomycetes
- Order: Microbotryales
- Family: Microbotryaceae
- Genus: Microbotryum; Lév. 1847

Species
- See text

= Microbotryum =

Genus of fungi

Microbotryum is a genus of smut fungi found in the family Microbotryaceae. It contains about 89 species, which are parasites of plants.

== Species ==
- Microbotryum adenopetalae
- Microbotryum afromontanum
- Microbotryum ahmadianum
- Microbotryum alsines
- Microbotryum anomalum
- Microbotryum arenariae-bryophyllae
- Microbotryum aviculare
- Microbotryum bardanense
- Microbotryum betonicae
- Microbotryum bistortarum
- Microbotryum bosniacum
- Microbotryum calandriniae
- Microbotryum calandriniicola
- Microbotryum calyptratae
- Microbotryum cardui
- Microbotryum carthusianorum
- Microbotryum cephalariae
- Microbotryum chloranthae-verrucosum
- Microbotryum cichorii
- Microbotryum cilinode
- Microbotryum claytoniae
- Microbotryum cordae
- Microbotryum coronariae
- Microbotryum coronatum
- Microbotryum dehiscens
- Microbotryum dianthorum
- Microbotryum dumosum
- Microbotryum duriaeanum
- Microbotryum emodensis
- Microbotryum filamenticola
- Microbotryum flosculorum
- Microbotryum gaussenii
- Microbotryum gayophyti
- Microbotryum goeppertianum
- Microbotryum himalense
- Microbotryum holostei
- Microbotryum intermedium
- Microbotryum jehudanum
- Microbotryum koenigiae
- Microbotryum kuehneanum
- Microbotryum lagerheimii
- Microbotryum lewisiae
- Microbotryum longisetum
- Microbotryum lychnidis-dioicae
- Microbotryum major
- Microbotryum marginale
- Microbotryum minuartiae
- Microbotryum moehringiae
- Microbotryum moelleri
- Microbotryum moenchiae-manticae
- Microbotryum montagnei
- Microbotryum morinae
- Microbotryum nannfeldtii
- Microbotryum nelsonianum
- Microbotryum nepalense
- Microbotryum nivale
- Microbotryum ocrearum
- Microbotryum onopordi
- Microbotryum parlatorei
- Microbotryum paucireticulatum
- Microbotryum perfoliatae
- Microbotryum picaceum
- Microbotryum pinguiculae
- Microbotryum piperi
- Microbotryum polygoni-alati
- Microbotryum primulae
- Microbotryum prostratum
- Microbotryum pustulatum
- Microbotryum radians
- Microbotryum receptaculorum
- Microbotryum reticulatum
- Microbotryum rhei
- Microbotryum salviae
- Microbotryum saponariae
- Microbotryum savilei
- Microbotryum scabiosae
- Microbotryum scolymi
- Microbotryum scorzonerae
- Microbotryum shastense
- Microbotryum shykoffianum
- Microbotryum silenes-acaulis
- Microbotryum silenes-dioicae
- Microbotryum silenes-inflatae
- Microbotryum silybum
- Microbotryum stellariae
- Microbotryum stewartii
- Microbotryum stygium
- Microbotryum succisae
- Microbotryum superbum
- Microbotryum tenuisporum
- Microbotryum tovarae
- Microbotryum tragopogonis-pratensis
- Microbotryum tuberculiforme
- Microbotryum tumeforme
- Microbotryum vinosum
- Microbotryum violaceoirregulare
- Microbotryum violaceoverrucosum
- Microbotryum violaceum
- Microbotryum warmingii
