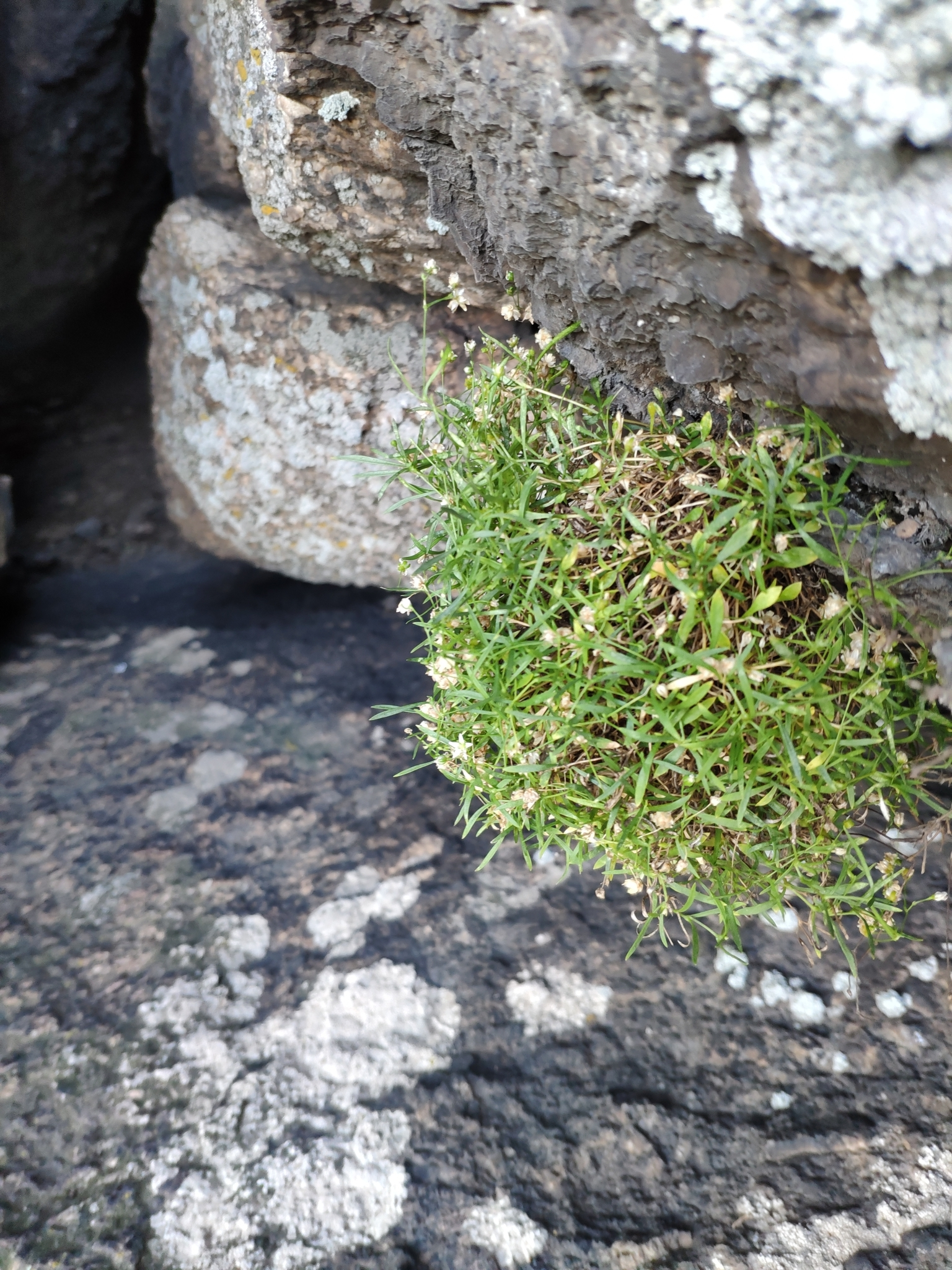
- Habit

Conservation status
- Vulnerable (IUCN 3.1)

Scientific classification
- Kingdom: Plantae
- Clade: Tracheophytes
- Clade: Angiosperms
- Clade: Eudicots
- Order: Caryophyllales
- Family: Caryophyllaceae
- Genus: Moehringia
- Species: M. hypanica

Binomial name
- Moehringia hypanica Grin & Klokov

= Moehringia hypanica =

Species of plant

Moehringia hypanica is a species of flowering plant in the family Caryophyllaceae. It is found only in southern Ukraine, north of Odessa. A perennial, it is typically found in rocky situations such as cliffsides and mountain summits. With only an estimated 250 adult individuals in five stations, it has been assessed as Vulnerable.
