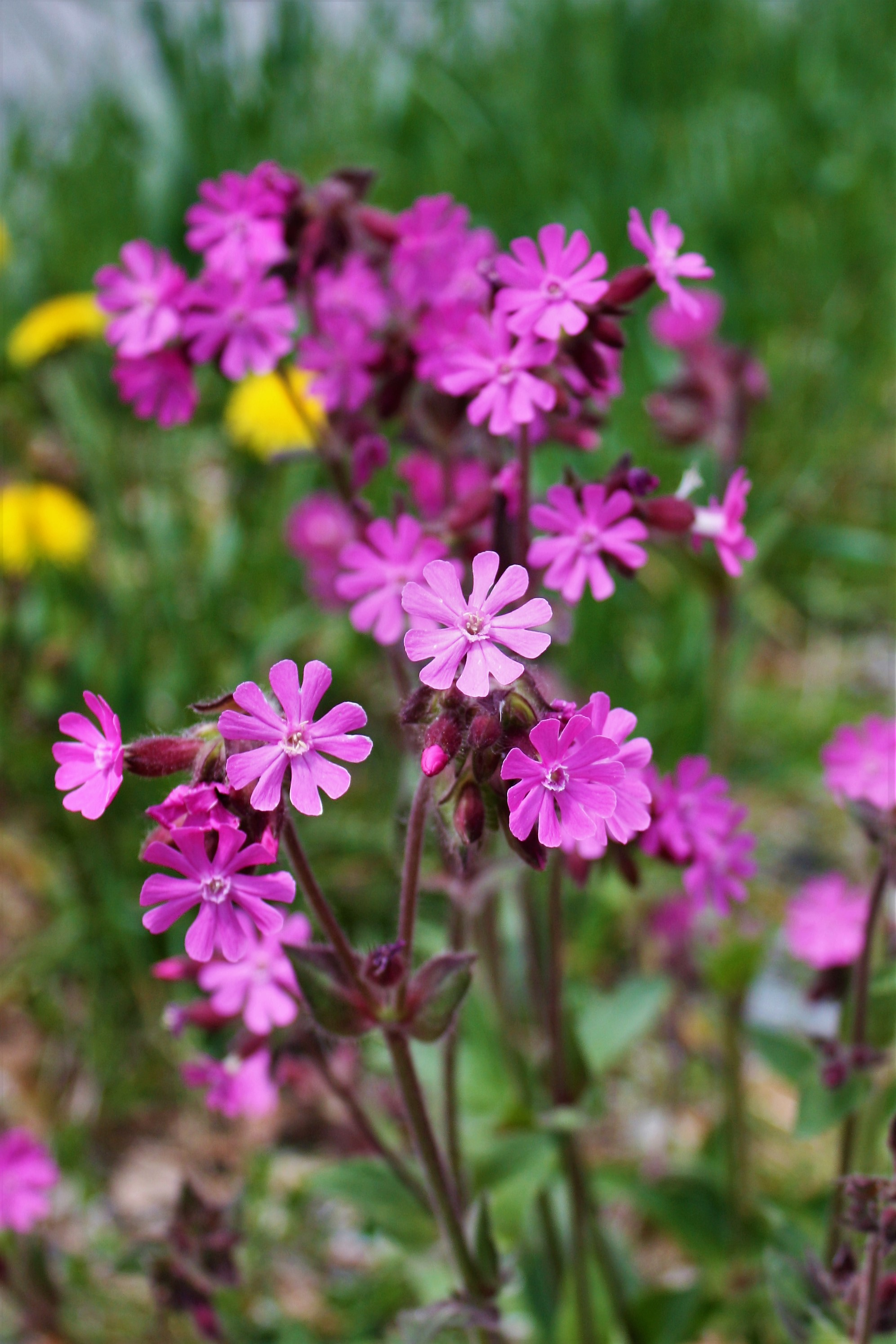
- Silene dioica (red campion)

Scientific classification
- Kingdom: Plantae
- Clade: Embryophytes
- Clade: Tracheophytes
- Clade: Spermatophytes
- Clade: Angiosperms
- Clade: Eudicots
- Order: Caryophyllales
- Family: Caryophyllaceae
- Genus: Silene
- Species: S. dioica

Binomial name
- Silene dioica (L.) Clairv.

Synonyms
- List: Agrostemma sylvestre (Schkuhr) G.Don; Lychnis arvensis G.Gaertn., B.Mey. & Scherb.; Lychnis dioecia Mill.; Lychnis dioica L.; Lychnis dioica subsp. rubra Weigel; Lychnis diurna Sibth.; Lychnis diurna var. glaberrima Sekera; Lychnis preslii Sekera; Lychnis rosea Salisb.; Lychnis rubra Patze, E.Mey. & Elkan; Lychnis silvestris Rafn; Lychnis sylvestris Schkuhr; Lychnis vespertina Sibth.; Melandrium dioicum (L.) Coss. & Germ.; Melandrium dioicum f. glaberrimum (Sekera) D.Löve; Melandrium dioicum f. lacteum (Hartm.) D.Löve; Melandrium dioicum subsp. glaberrimum (Celak.) Soják; Melandrium dioicum subsp. rubrum (Weigel) D.Löve; Melandrium dioicum var. zetlandicum Compton; Melandrium diurnum Fr.; Melandrium preslii (Sekera) Nyman; Melandrium purpureum Rupr.; Melandrium rubrum (Weigel) Garcke; Melandrium stenophyllum Schur; Saponaria dioica (L.) Moench; Silene dioica f. lactea (Hartm.) Meusel & K.Werner; Silene dioica subsp. glaberrima (Celak.) Soják; Silene dioica var. glaberrima (K.Malý) Meusel & K.Werner; Silene dioica var. glabrescens (Schur) Meusel & K.Werner; Silene dioica var. glandulosa (Brügger) Kerguélen; Silene dioica var. pygmaea (Ser.) Meusel & K.Werner; Silene dioica var. serpentinicola (Rune) Ericsson; Silene dioica var. smithii (Rune) Ericsson; Silene dioica var. stenophylla (Schur) Meusel & K.Werner; Silene dioica var. zetlandica (Compton) Kerguélen; Silene diurna Gren. & Godr.; Silene hornemannii Steud.; Silene latifolia Hornem.; Silene rubra Burnat

= Silene dioica =

Species of flowering plant in the carnation family

Silene dioica (syn. Melandrium rubrum), known as red campion and red catchfly, is a herbaceous flowering plant in the family Caryophyllaceae, native to Europe and introduced to the Americas.

== Description ==
It is a biennial or perennial plant, which grows to 30–90 centimetres (12–35 inches) tall, with branching stems. The deep green leaves are in opposite and decussate pairs, simple acute ovate, 3–8 cm (1–3 in) long with an untoothed margin; both the leaves and stems of the plant are hairy and slightly sticky. The upper leaves are stalkless.

Blooming from May to October, the unscented flowers are dark pink to red, each 1.8–2.5 cm (3/4–1 in) across. There are five petals which are deeply notched at the end, narrowed at the base and all go into an urn-shaped calyx. As indicated by the specific name, male and female flowers are borne on separate plants (dioecious), the male with 10 stamens and a 10-veined calyx, the female with 5 styles and a 20-veined calyx.

The fruit, produced from July onwards, is an ovoid capsule containing numerous seeds, opening at the apex by 10 teeth which curve back.

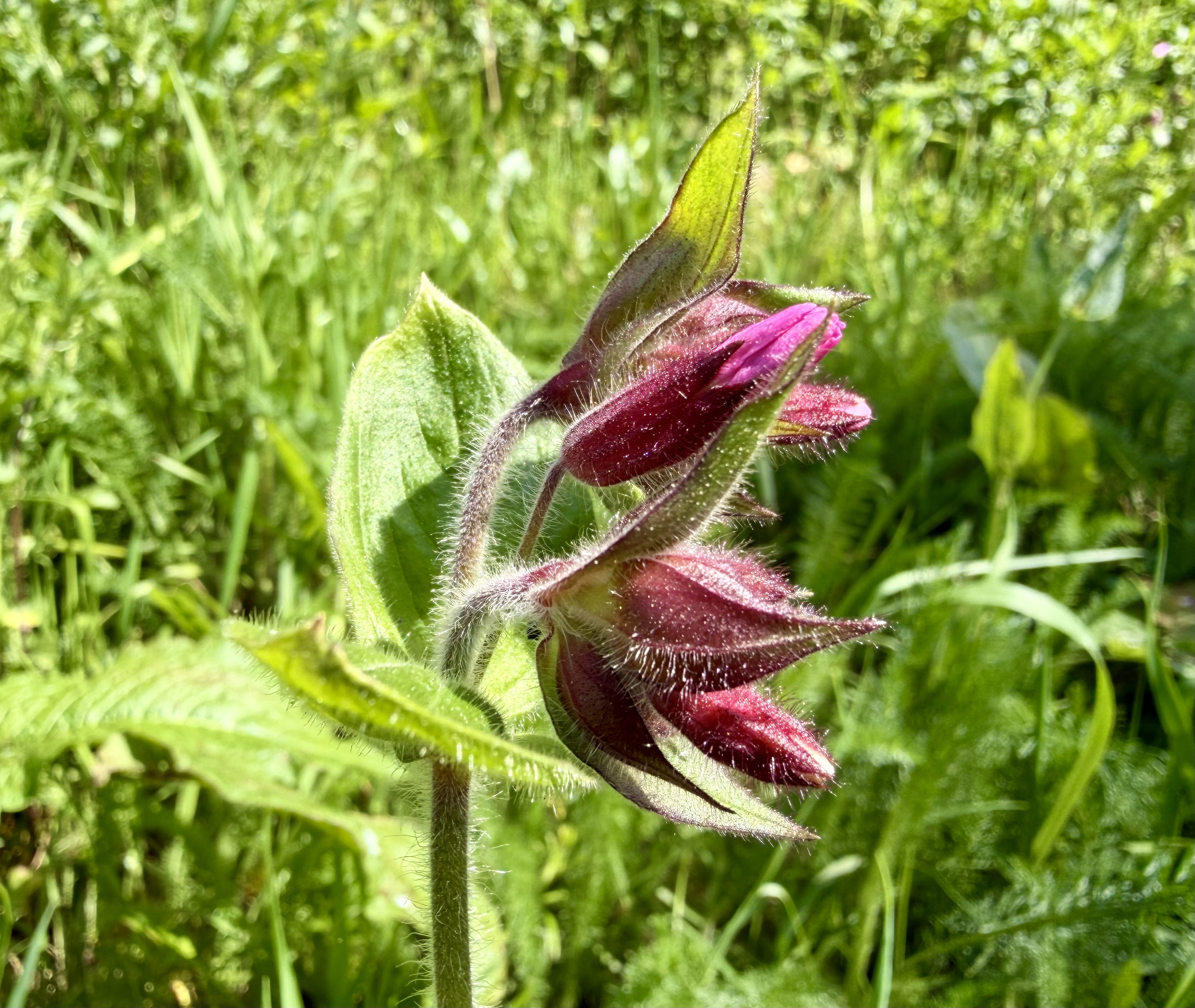
Buds

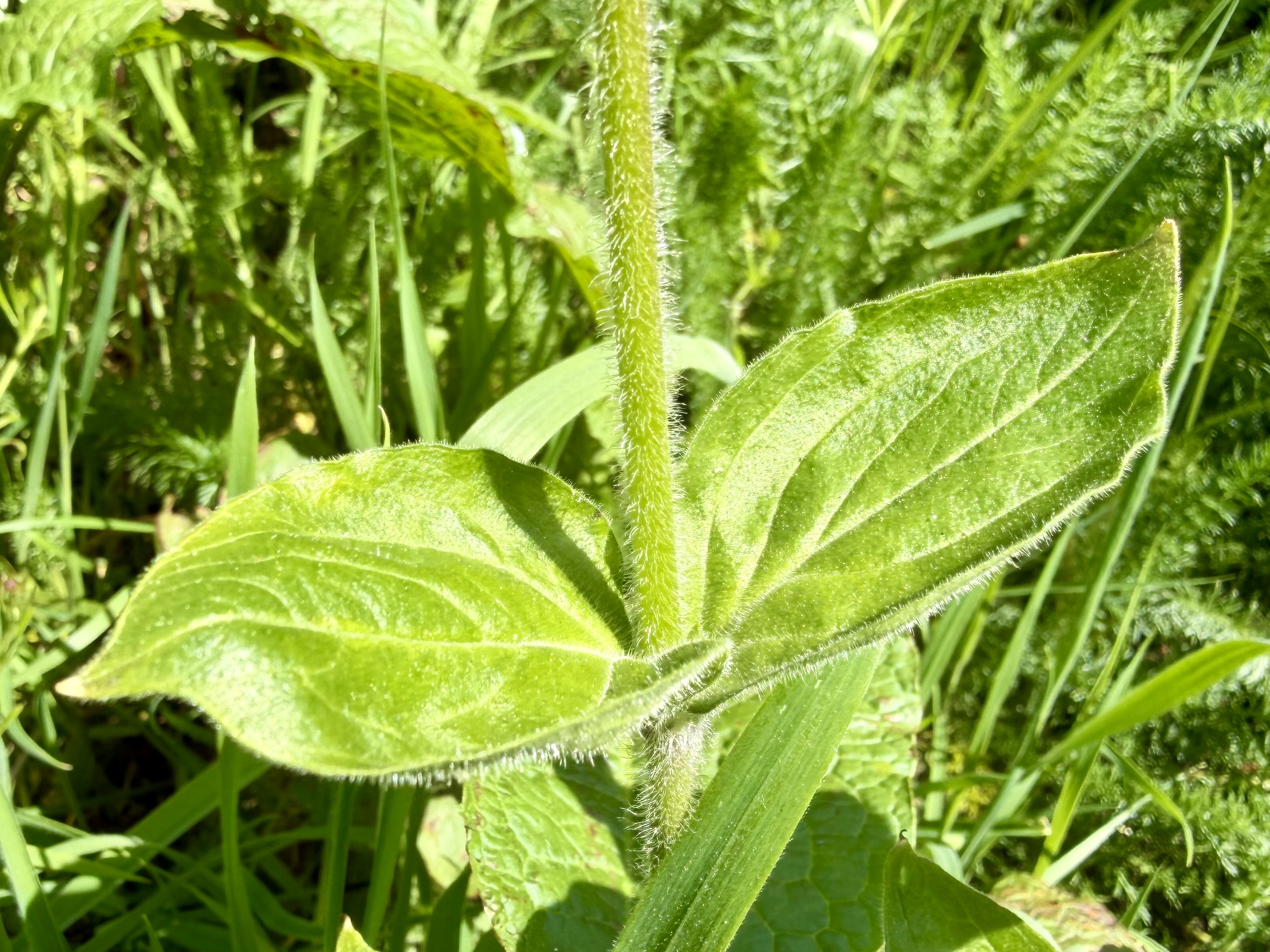
Leaves and stem

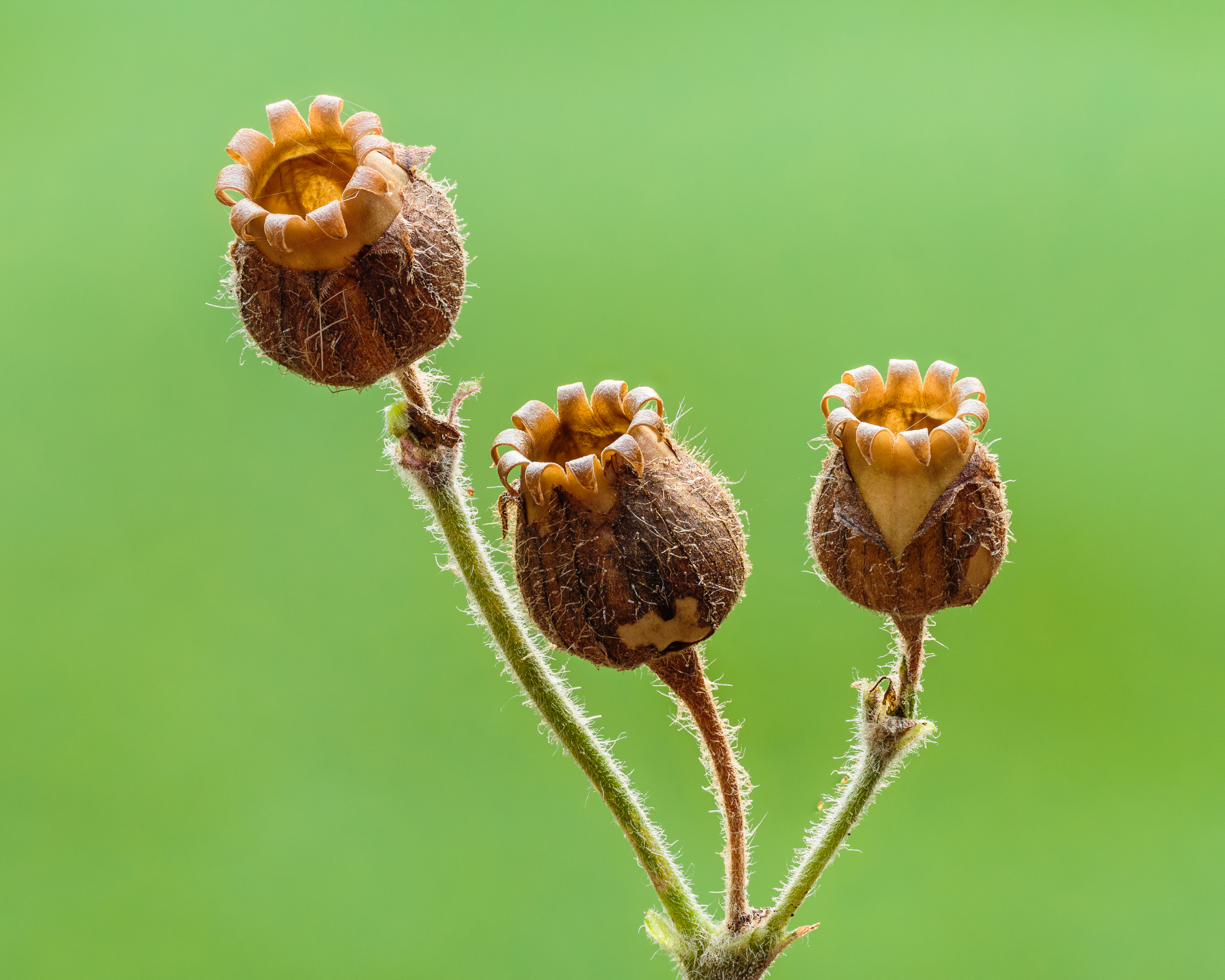
Seed pods

== Taxonomy ==
Plants of Silene latifolia × Silene dioica = Silene × hampeana that are fertile hybrids with the closely related white campion (Silene latifolia) are common in some areas. They may have paler pink flowers and be intermediate between the two species in other characters.

== Distribution and habitat ==
Silene dioica is native to northern and central Europe and is locally abundant throughout the British Isles. It is generally common in Northern Ireland, but rare elsewhere in Ireland. It is common on the Isle of Man. It has been introduced in Iceland, Canada, the US, and Argentina.

Red campion grows in roadsides, woodlands, and rocky slopes. It prefers to grow on damp, non-acid soils.

== Ecology ==
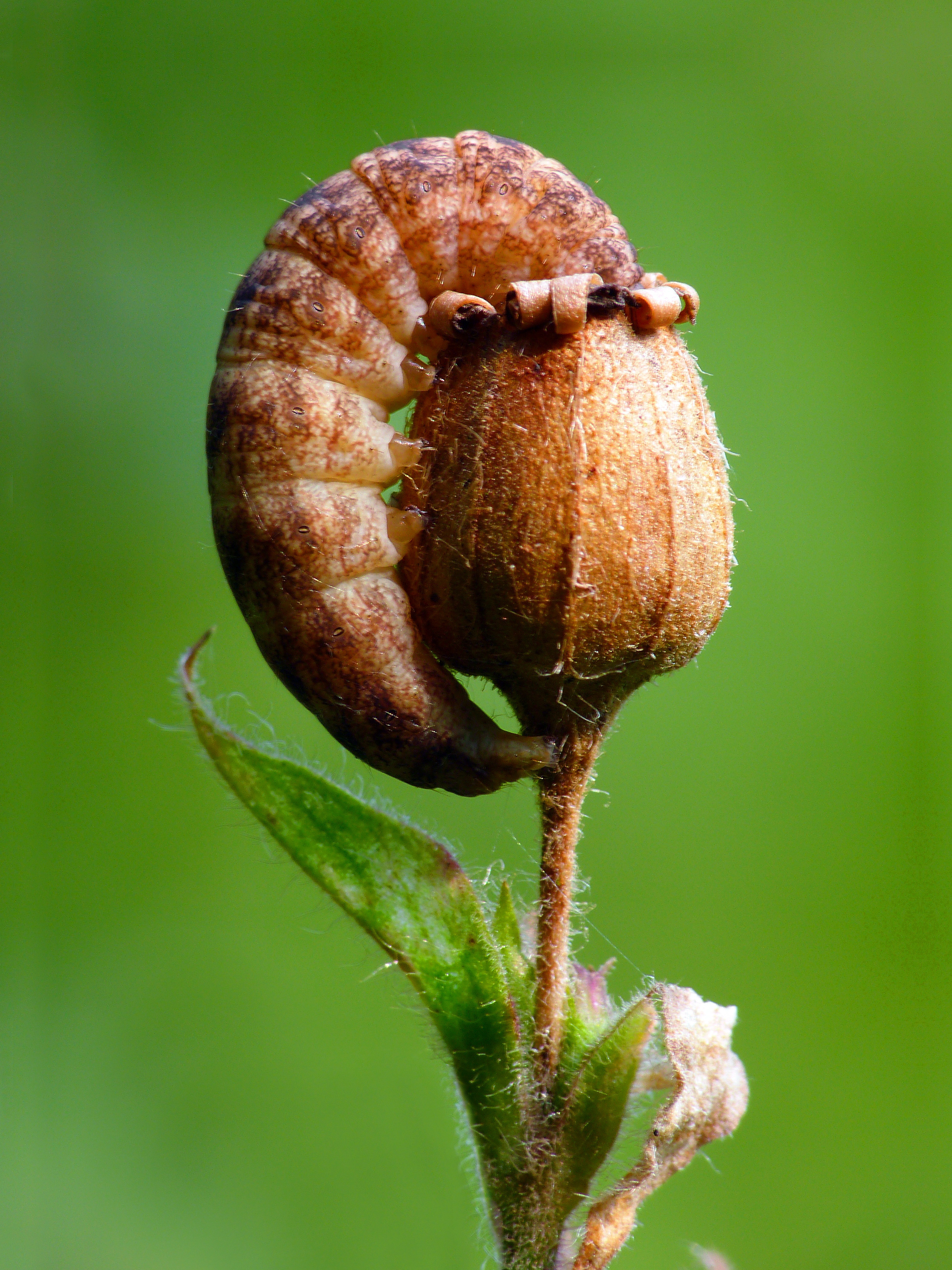
A Lychnis moth caterpillar feeding on the seeds of red campion (Silene dioica)

The flowers are frequently visited by flies such as Rhingia campestris. The nectar of the flowers is utilised by bumblebees and butterflies, and several species of moth feed on the foliage.

The flowers of red-campion along with a number of other Caryophyllaceae members, are very susceptible to a smut infection. In this case by Microbotryum silenes-dioicae known as anther-smut which appears as a mass of brown spores in the mouth of the flower where the anthers would normally be.

== Cultivation ==
This plant is used as an ornamental perennial flower for the perennial border. One particularly notable variety is a hot pink, double flowered variety with deep green leaves called 'Firefly'.

== Medicinal and culinary uses ==
The young leaves and flowers of red campion are edible, although cooking or blanching is recommended to remove the bitter aftertaste.

Nicholas Culpeper recommended red campion for the treatment of warts, corns, kidney disease, internal bleeding, insect stings, and adder bites.

== In culture ==
On the Isle of Man, it is known as "blaa ny ferrishyn" or "fairy flower", and there is a local taboo against picking it.

In the Catholic Church, red campion flowers are associated with the Jesuit martyr Edmund Campion.
