= Zundeliomyces =

Scientific classification
- Kingdom: Fungi
- Division: Basidiomycota
- Class: Microbotryomycetes
- Order: Microbotryales
- Family: Microbotryaceae
- Genus: Zundeliomyces; Vánky 1987

Species
- Zundeliomyces polygoni Vánky 1987

Genus of fungi

Zundeliomyces is a monotypic genus of fungi found in the family Microbotryaceae. It contains the single species Zundeliomyces polygoni.
