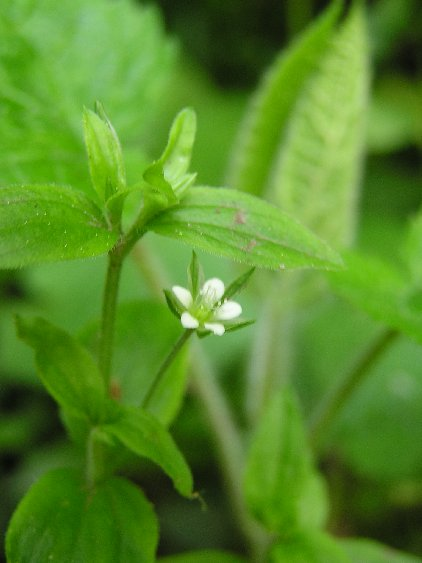

Scientific classification
- Kingdom: Plantae
- Clade: Tracheophytes
- Clade: Angiosperms
- Clade: Eudicots
- Order: Caryophyllales
- Family: Caryophyllaceae
- Genus: Moehringia
- Species: M. trinervia

Binomial name
- Moehringia trinervia (L.) Clairv.

= Moehringia trinervia =

Species of flowering plant

Moehringia trinervia, commonly known as apetalous sandwort or three-nerved sandwort, is a herbaceous flowering plant in the family Caryophyllaceae. A native of Eurasia, it has been introduced into North America.

== Description ==
Three-nerved sandwort is a small, slender, slightly pubescent annual growing 10 – 40 cm tall. The leaves are 6 – 25 mm long with three conspicuous longitudinal veins, although some leaves may have up to five veins. The flowers measure approximately 6 mm in diameter, with each bearing ten stamens and three styles. The three-veined sepals are longer than the petals. The flowering period is April until July.

== Habitat and distribution ==
The plant is widely distributed in Britain and much of mainland Europe, although it is absent from the Hebrides, Orkney, and Shetland. It favours fertile, well-drained soils in old lowland deciduous woodland and hedgerows, occurring up to 425 m. In Britain, it is considered an ancient woodland indicator in southern England, East Anglia, and Carmarthen. However, three-nerved sandwort may also be found in secondary woodland and can recolonize relatively rapidly after habitat disturbance.

A Polish study in the Niepołomice Forest found that three-nerved sandwort accumulated high amounts of heavy metals from pollutive industrial emissions in its tissues, especially of cadmium. The conclusion was that a high level of heavy metal ions in three-nerved sandwort reflects levels of heavy metal pollutants in the soil and atmosphere, so that this plant may serve as a useful bioindicator of environmental pollution with such metals.

== Similar species ==
Three nerved sandwort superficially resembles chickweed but is distinguished from the latter by its deep longitudinal leaf veins and undivided petals. .
