= Ustilentylomataceae =

Scientific classification
- Kingdom: Fungi
- Division: Basidiomycota
- Class: Microbotryomycetes
- Order: Microbotryales
- Family: Ustilentylomataceae; R. Bauer & Oberw. 1997

Genera
- Aurantiosporium; Fulvisporium; Ustilentyloma

Family of fungi

Ustilentylomataceae is a family of Basidiomycota fungi in the order Microbotryales. It contains 3 genera.
