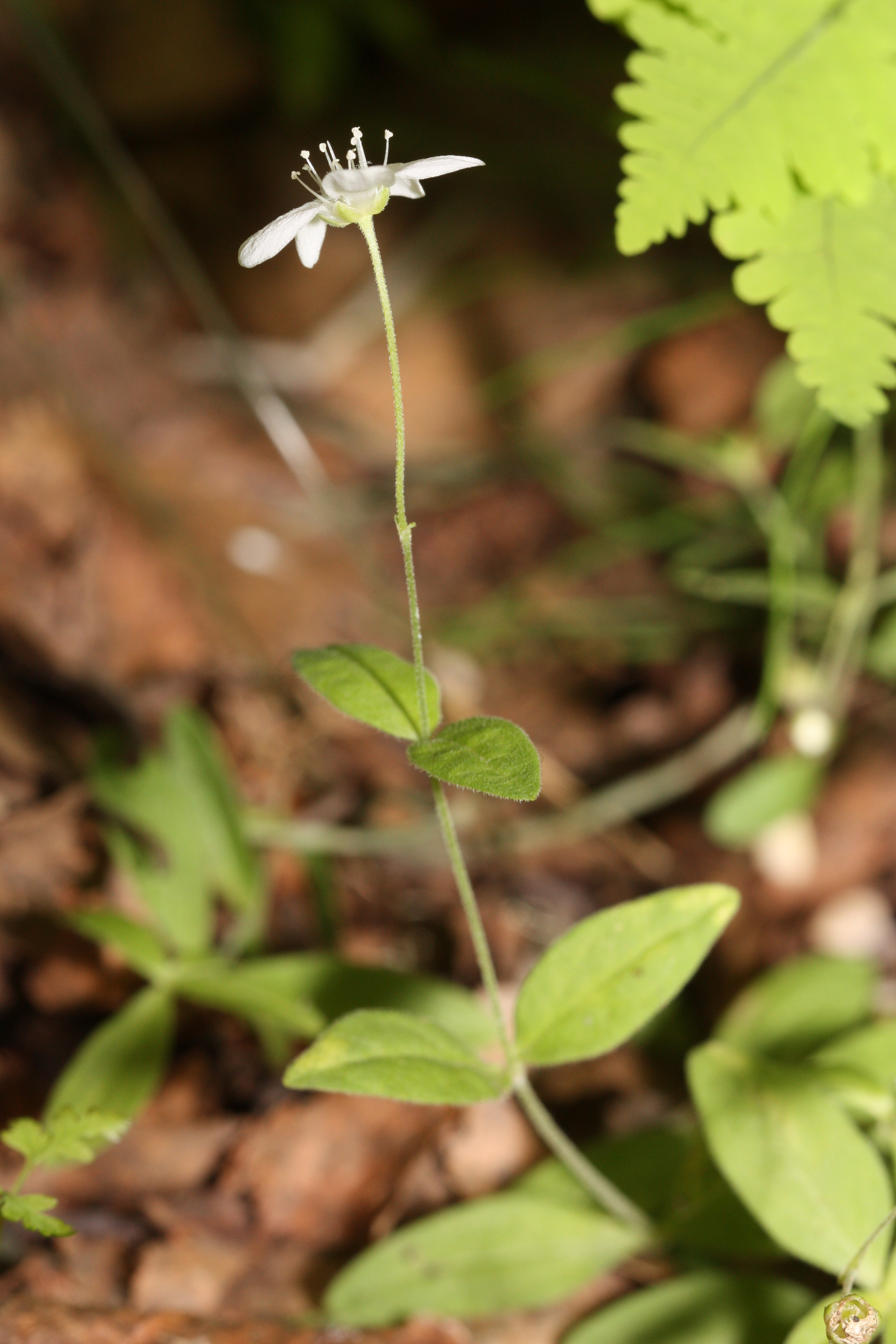
- Moehringia lateriflora

Scientific classification
- Kingdom: Plantae
- Clade: Tracheophytes
- Clade: Angiosperms
- Clade: Eudicots
- Order: Caryophyllales
- Family: Caryophyllaceae
- Genus: Moehringia; L.

Species
- 27 species

= Moehringia =

Genus of flowering plants in the carnation family

Moehringia is a genus of flowering plants in the family Caryophyllaceae. Members of this genus and of some other genera in Caryophyllaceae are commonly called sandworts. They are found only in the north temperate zone. The genus Moehringia was first formally named by Carl Linnaeus in 1753. It is named after the German naturalist Paul Möhring (1710–1792).

Its type species is Moehringia muscosa. By 1992, there were 31 recognized species. In 2007, Fior and Karis transferred four species from Moehringia to Arenaria, leaving Moehringia with 27 species. M. fontqueri, M. intricata, M. tejedensis, and M. glochidisperma were renamed A. funiculata, A. suffruticosa, A. tejedensis, and A. glochidisperma, respectively.

== Species ==
Currently accepted species are:

- Moehringia argenteria Casazza & Minuto
- Moehringia bavarica (L.) Gren.
- Moehringia castellana (J.M.Monts.) Rivas Mart., Cantó & J.M.Pizarro
- Moehringia ciliata (Scop.) Dalla Torre
- Moehringia concarenae F.Fen. & F.Martini
- Moehringia × coronensis Behr
- Moehringia dielsiana Mattf.
- Moehringia diversifolia Dolliner ex W.D.J.Koch
- Moehringia glaucovirens Bertol.
- Moehringia grisebachii Janka
- Moehringia × hybrida A.Kern. ex Mazzetti
- Moehringia hypanica Grin & Klokov
- Moehringia insubrica Degen
- Moehringia intermedia (Loisel.) Panizzi
- Moehringia jankae Griseb. ex Janka
- Moehringia lateriflora (L.) Fenzl
- Moehringia lebrunii Merxm.
- Moehringia macrophylla (Hook.) Fenzl
- Moehringia markgrafii Merxm. & Gutermann
- Moehringia minutiflora Bornm.
- Moehringia muscosa L.
- Moehringia papulosa Bertol.
- Moehringia pendula (Waldst. & Kit.) Fenzl
- Moehringia pentandra J.Gay
- Moehringia pichleri Huter
- Moehringia sedoides (Pers.) Cumino ex Loisel.
- Moehringia stellarioides Coss.
- Moehringia tommasinii Marches.
- Moehringia trinervia (L.) Clairv.
- Moehringia umbrosa (Bunge) Fenzl
- Moehringia villosa (Wulfen) Fenzl
