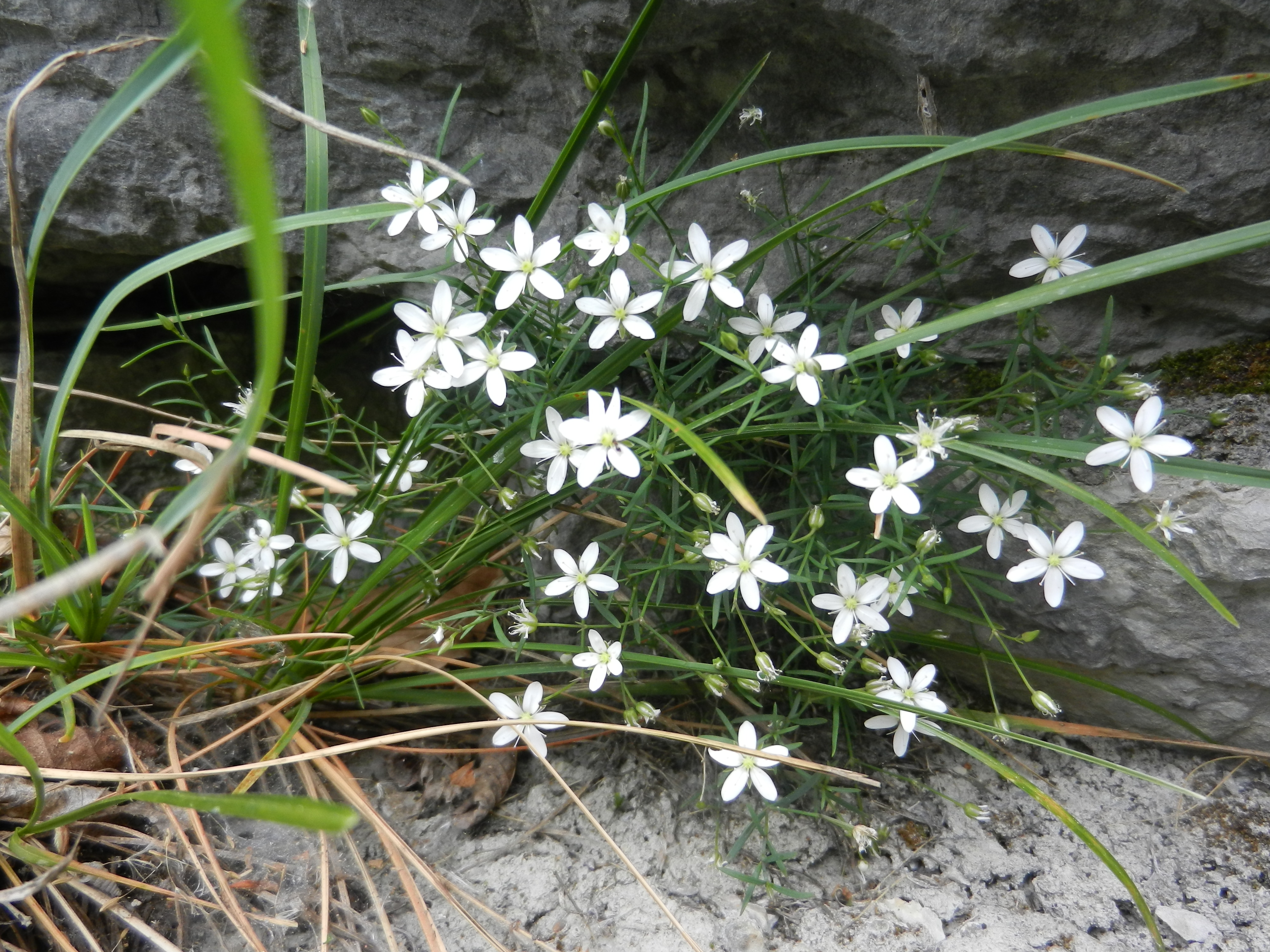

Conservation status
- Data Deficient (IUCN 3.1)

Scientific classification
- Kingdom: Plantae
- Clade: Tracheophytes
- Clade: Angiosperms
- Clade: Eudicots
- Order: Caryophyllales
- Family: Caryophyllaceae
- Genus: Moehringia
- Species: M. villosa

Binomial name
- Moehringia villosa (Wulfen) Fenzl

= Moehringia villosa =

Species of plant

Moehringia villosa, commonly known as the short-haired sandwort, is a flowering plant of the family Caryophyllaceae. It is endemic to Slovenia where it has a very limited range with an extent of occurrence of less than 1,000 square kilometres (390 sq mi) in the southern parts of the Julian Alps. It grows in cracks in sunny, rocky and dry areas.

== Habitat, distribution, and ecology ==
Moehringia villosa is endemic to Slovenia, with a restricted distribution in the southern Julian Alps and their foothills. Its known distribution area spans from its easternmost locality under Mt. Hoč above the village of Podporezen (Železniki municipality), to its northeasternmost locality under Skopska Crna Gora in the area of Home (Bohinj municipality). The southernmost populations occur at Hudičev rob under Mt. Kojca (Cerkno municipality), while the northwesternmost locality—which represents the extreme northwestern boundary of the species' entire global range—is at Curk waterfall under Mt. Krn (Kobarid municipality). The majority of known localities are situated in the upper Bača valley in the Tolmin municipality.

The species inhabits crevices in limestone, dolomite, marlstone, and chert rocks. It typically grows on steep to vertical rock faces with slopes of 80–100 degrees, at elevations ranging from approximately 445 to 1,475 metres above sea level. These rock faces vary in aspect, though many localities have southern, southeastern, or eastern exposures.

Phytosociologically, M. villosa primarily occurs in the plant community Campanulo carnicae–Moehringietum villosae, often associated with other specialized rock-dwelling plants including Campanula carnica, Paederota lutea, Asplenium trichomanes, and Sesleria caerulea. Based on variations in habitat conditions and associated species, researchers have identified several variants of this community, including those characterized by Carex mucronata, Paederota lutea, Festuca stenantha, and Campanula carnica.

While predominantly found in relatively dry rock crevices, M. villosa occasionally appears in more water-loving (hydrophilic) plant communities with dominant Viola biflora, particularly at sites like Curk waterfall. The species shows morphological variation, with specimens at some localities (including Curk waterfall) corresponding to the less hairy form Moehringia villosa f. glabrescens. As of 2021, the species was assessed as vital with generally unthreatened populations, as its rocky habitats are not subject to direct human intervention.
