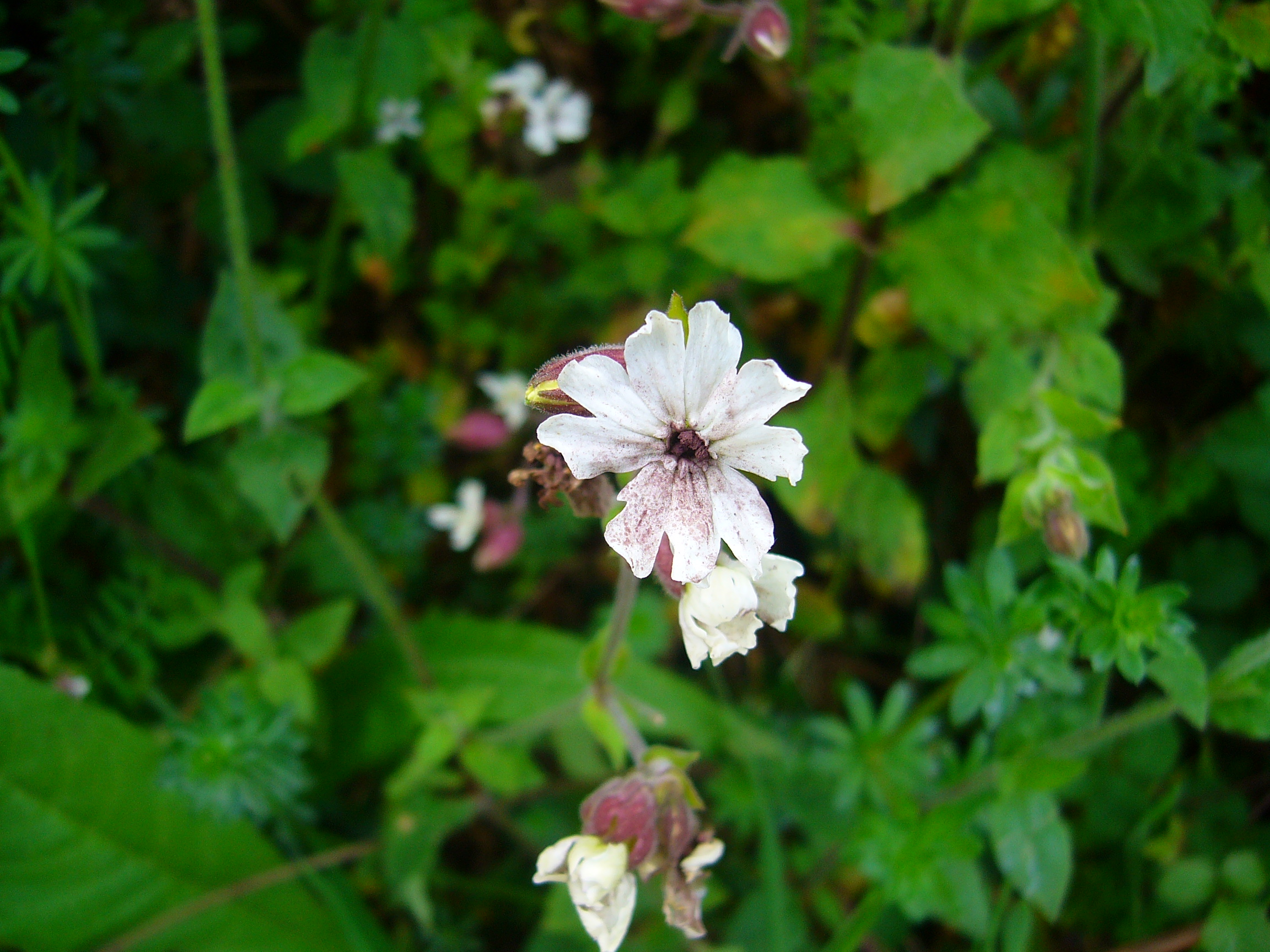

Scientific classification
- Kingdom: Fungi
- Division: Basidiomycota
- Class: Microbotryomycetes
- Order: Microbotryales
- Family: Microbotryaceae; R.T.Moore (1996)

Genera
- Bauerago; Liroa; Microbotryum; Sphacelotheca; Zundeliomyces

= Microbotryaceae =

Family of fungi

Microbotryaceae is a family of Basidiomycota fungi in the order Microbotryales.
