= Microbotryales =

Scientific classification
- Kingdom: Fungi
- Division: Basidiomycota
- Class: Microbotryomycetes
- Order: Microbotryales; R.Bauer & Oberw. (1997)

Families
- Microbotryaceae; Ustilentylomataceae

Order of fungi

The Microbotryales are an order of fungi in the Microbotryomycetes class of the Basidiomycota. The order contains 2 families, 9 genera, and 114 species. The order was circumscribed in 1997.
