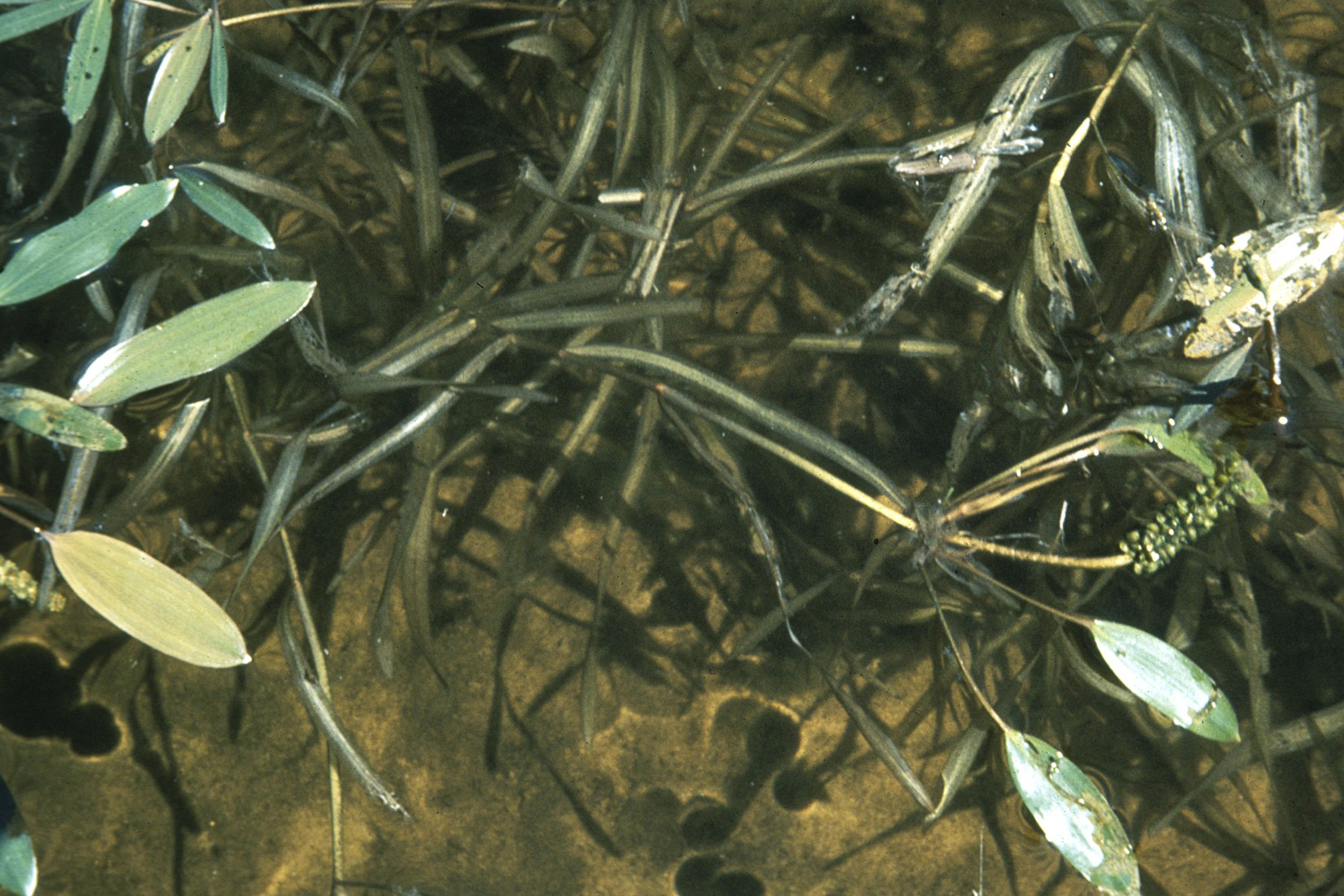

Scientific classification
- Kingdom: Plantae
- Clade: Tracheophytes
- Clade: Angiosperms
- Clade: Monocots
- Order: Alismatales
- Family: Potamogetonaceae
- Genus: Potamogeton
- Species: P. epihydrus

Binomial name
- Potamogeton epihydrus Raf.

Synonyms
- Potamogeton cayugensis (Wiegand) Hagstr.; Potamogeton claytonii Tuck.; Potamogeton nuttallii Cham. & Schltdl.; Potamogeton pennsylvanicus Willd. ex Cham. & Schltdl.; Potamogeton pumilus Wolfg.; Potamogeton purshii Tuck. ex Jennison

= Potamogeton epihydrus =

Species of aquatic plant

Potamogeton epihydrus is a perennial aquatic plant known by the common names ribbonleaf pondweed and Nuttall's pondweed (not to be confused with Elodea nuttallii), and American pondweed in the United Kingdom. It is native to much of North America, where it grows in water bodies such as ponds, lakes, ditches, and slow-moving streams.

== Description ==
The plant is a perennial rhizomatous herb producing narrow, compressed, unspotted stems, up to a length of about 1 m, which are unbranched or sparingly branched. It has two types of leaf:

- Submersed leaves, which are sessile and 5–25 cm long, 0.1–1 cm wide, translucent, linear in shape and ribbonlike, and red-brown to light green in colour, with a blunt to acute tip
- Floating leaves, similar to the floating leaves of other Potamogeton, which are petiolate and opaque, and up to 8 centimeters long and 3 wide

The inflorescence is a small spike of flowers that arises from the water on a peduncle 1.5–5 (rarely, up to 16) cm.

It is a diploid species, with 2n = 26. Hybrids have been described with P. gramineus, P. nodosus (P. × subsessilis Hagstrom), P. bicupulatus (P. × aemulans Z. Kaplan, Hellq. and Fehrer), and P. perfoliatus (P. × versicolor Z. Kaplan, Hellq. and Fehrer).

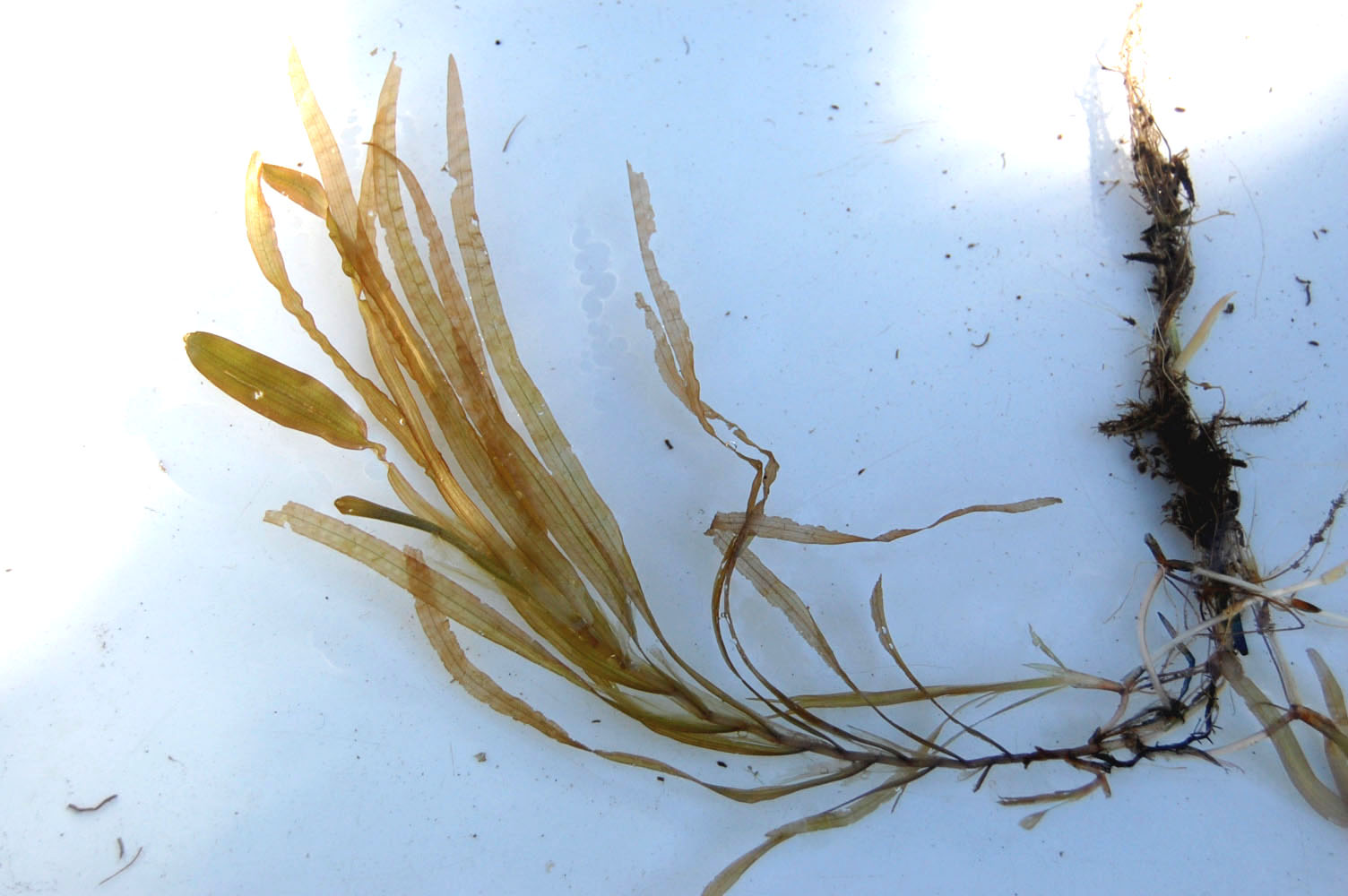
Potamogeton epihydrus, whole plant. Photo: Barre Hellquist.

== Taxonomy ==
Potamogeton epihydrus (meaning 'on the water surface') was described by Rafinesque in 1808, one of the earlier North American species to be named.

DNA analysis indicates that, despite the presence of floating leaves, P. epihydrus is closely related to P. tennesseensis, both of which are within the basal members of the large clade of fine-leaved pondweeds including P. diversifolius, P. pusillus and P. compressus.

== Distribution ==
Ribbonleaf pondweed is predominantly a North American species, widespread in boreal and temperate areas. Its centres of distribution are the northeastern US; southeastern Canada, from the Atlantic to the Great Lakes; and the Pacific seaboard from northern California to British Columbia. There are scattered populations in Alabama and Louisiana, Alaska, Wyoming, Montana and central Canada.

There are two isolated populations in Britain, where it was identified as recently as 1944: in the Outer Hebrides, where it is thought to be naturally occurring; and an accidentally introduced population in the Rochdale and Calder & Hebble Canals.

== Ecology and conservation ==
Ribbonleaf pondweed generally grows in shallow, standing to slow-flowing standing and running waters at up to 1900 m altitude. It tolerates acid waters as low as pH 5 and has a preference for oligotrophic, soft water conditions. Liming experiments suggest that it is sensitive to severe acidification. It is a poor disperser relative to many other aquatic plants occurring in Connecticut lakes.

It is generally common and widespread in North America; however, it is listed as Endangered in Indiana and Special Concern in Tennessee. In Britain it is Nationally Rare and listed as Vulnerable. British populations lack detectable genetic variation, suggesting a strong founder effect.

== Cultivation ==
P. epihydrus is not in cultivation, but would be worth attempting to grow. Its fairly small size, ribbonlike underwater leaves and scattered floating leaves could be effectively used in garden ponds, tubs or streams. Introduced populations in Britain have not proved invasive, so there is little chance of it becoming problematic. Like other pondweeds, it must be planted with the root in contact with a suitable substrate such as aquatic compost.
