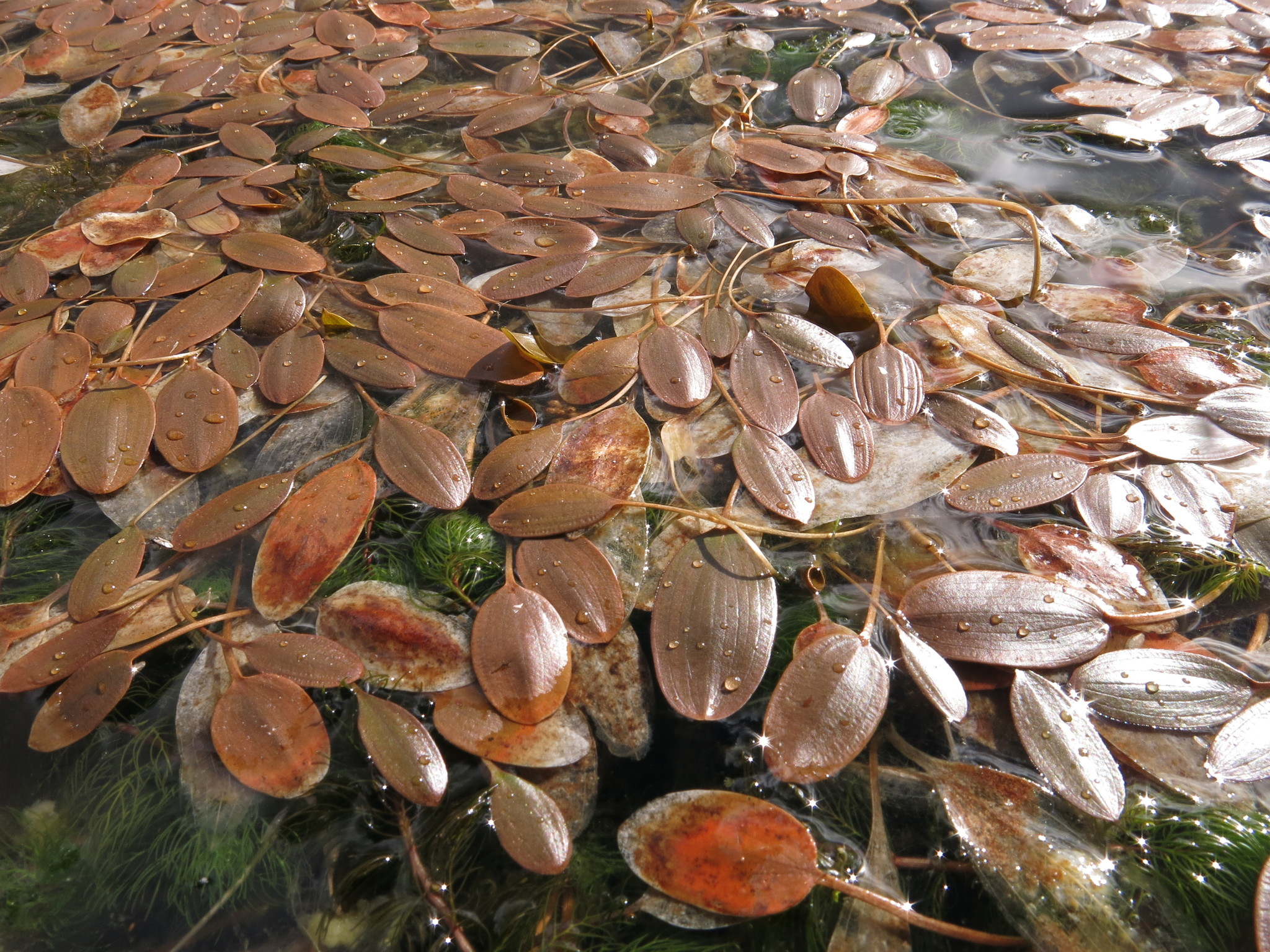
- Potamogeton cheesemanii in the Manuherikia River

Conservation status
- Not Threatened (NZ TCS)

Scientific classification
- Kingdom: Plantae
- Clade: Tracheophytes
- Clade: Angiosperms
- Clade: Monocots
- Order: Alismatales
- Family: Potamogetonaceae
- Genus: Potamogeton
- Species: P. cheesemanii

Binomial name
- Potamogeton cheesemanii A.Benn.

= Potamogeton cheesemanii =

Species of plant

Potamogeton cheesemanii or red pondweed (rērēwai or mānihi in Māori) is a species of plant, indigenous to New Zealand and Australia. It is a vascular monocot.

== Description ==
The rhizomes root at nodes, and produce long branches with few leaves. The leaves take two shapes: those underwater are longer and translucent, while the ones that float are oval and opaque. The flowers, a dense spike, float, although they submerge when they begin to fruit. The flowers are cream, red, or pink. The species flowers from November to February, and fruits from December to March.

This species can be told from Potamogeton suboblongus by the dimorphic leaves, and from P. ochreatus by its well separated longitudinal nerves.

The biomass of this plant varies seasonally, with less biomass found in the winter months than in the summer and spring. While height-restricted, P. cheesemanii is one of the taller plants in native hydrophyte communities.

== Range ==
This species is found across New Zealand, on all of the major islands including the Chatham Islands, and some of the minor islands such as Great Barrier. It also grows in southern Australia and Tasmania, although at least one authority considers it endemic to New Zealand.

Macrofossils of P. cheesemanii seeds have been found from the Aranuian era in Canterbury, roughly 14k-10k ybp.

== Habitat ==
Potamogeton cheesemanii grows on slow rivers, ponds, lakes, and ditches. It grows from the coast to the montane areas. They can grow in tarns at at least 1000 m in elevation.

== Ecology ==
Potamogeton cheesemanii is associated with some macroinvertebrate communities, but not as many as other native hydrophytes according to at least one study. Some attempts at using Grass Carp to eat pond weeds has found that they will eat P. cheesemanii, but generally prefer other plants.

Multiple species of dragonfly lay their eggs on the leaves.

== Etymology ==
Potamogeton means 'river dweller' in Greek. Cheesemanii is named after Thomas Cheeseman, who sent specimens to Arthur Bennett from Lake Waiatarua near Auckland.

== Taxonomy ==
This species was described under three separate names in 1916 by Johan Oscar Hagström: Potamogeton cheesemanii f. tasmanicus, Potamogeton porrigens, and Potamogeton sessilifolius. These are now considered synonyms.
