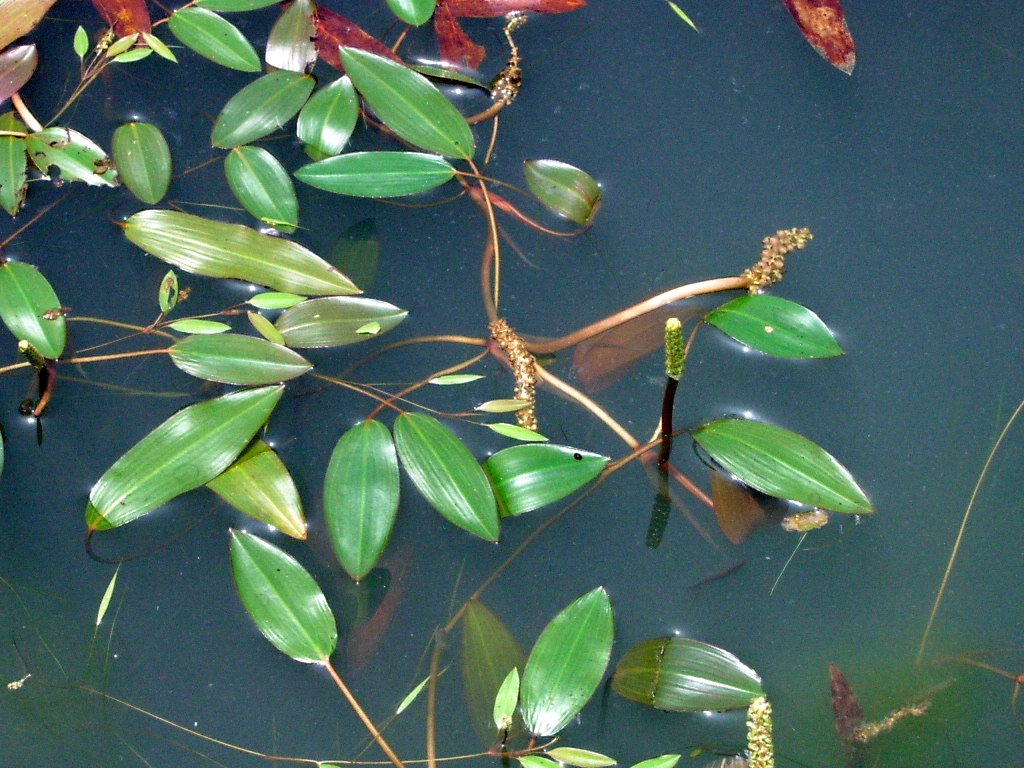

Scientific classification
- Kingdom: Plantae
- Clade: Tracheophytes
- Clade: Angiosperms
- Clade: Monocots
- Order: Alismatales
- Family: Potamogetonaceae
- Genus: Potamogeton
- Species: P. distinctus

Binomial name
- Potamogeton distinctus A.Benn.

= Potamogeton distinctus =

Species of aquatic plant

Potamogeton distinctus, the pondweed, is an aquatic plant species in the genus Potamogeton. It is found in slow moving fresh water. It is widely distributed in the east of temperate Asia (the Russian Far East, China and Eastern Asia), tropical Asia (the Indian subcontinent, Indo-China and Malesia) and also grows in the Southwestern Pacific.

== Description ==
Aquatic herb.
