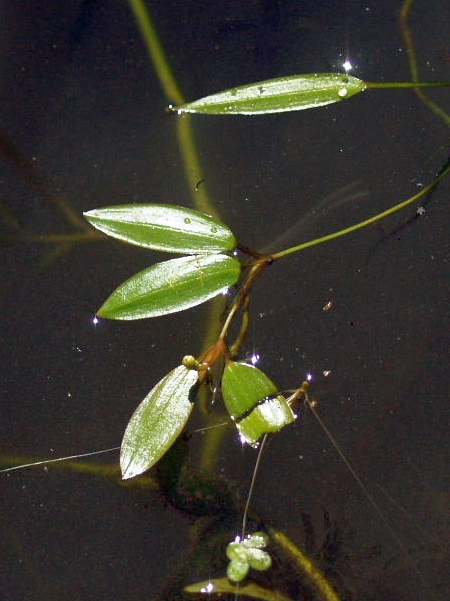

Scientific classification
- Kingdom: Plantae
- Clade: Tracheophytes
- Clade: Angiosperms
- Clade: Monocots
- Order: Alismatales
- Family: Potamogetonaceae
- Genus: Potamogeton
- Species: P. cristatus

Binomial name
- Potamogeton cristatus Regel & Maack

= Potamogeton cristatus =

Species of aquatic plant

Potamogeton cristatus, the little-leaf pondweed, is an aquatic plant species in the genus Potamogeton. It is found in slow moving fresh water.

== Distribution ==
It is native to the Russian Far East and Eastern Asia.
