= Shining pondweed =

Shining pondweed is a common name for several aquatic plants and may refer to:

- Potamogeton illinoensis, native to North America
- Potamogeton lucens, native to Eurasia and north Africa
