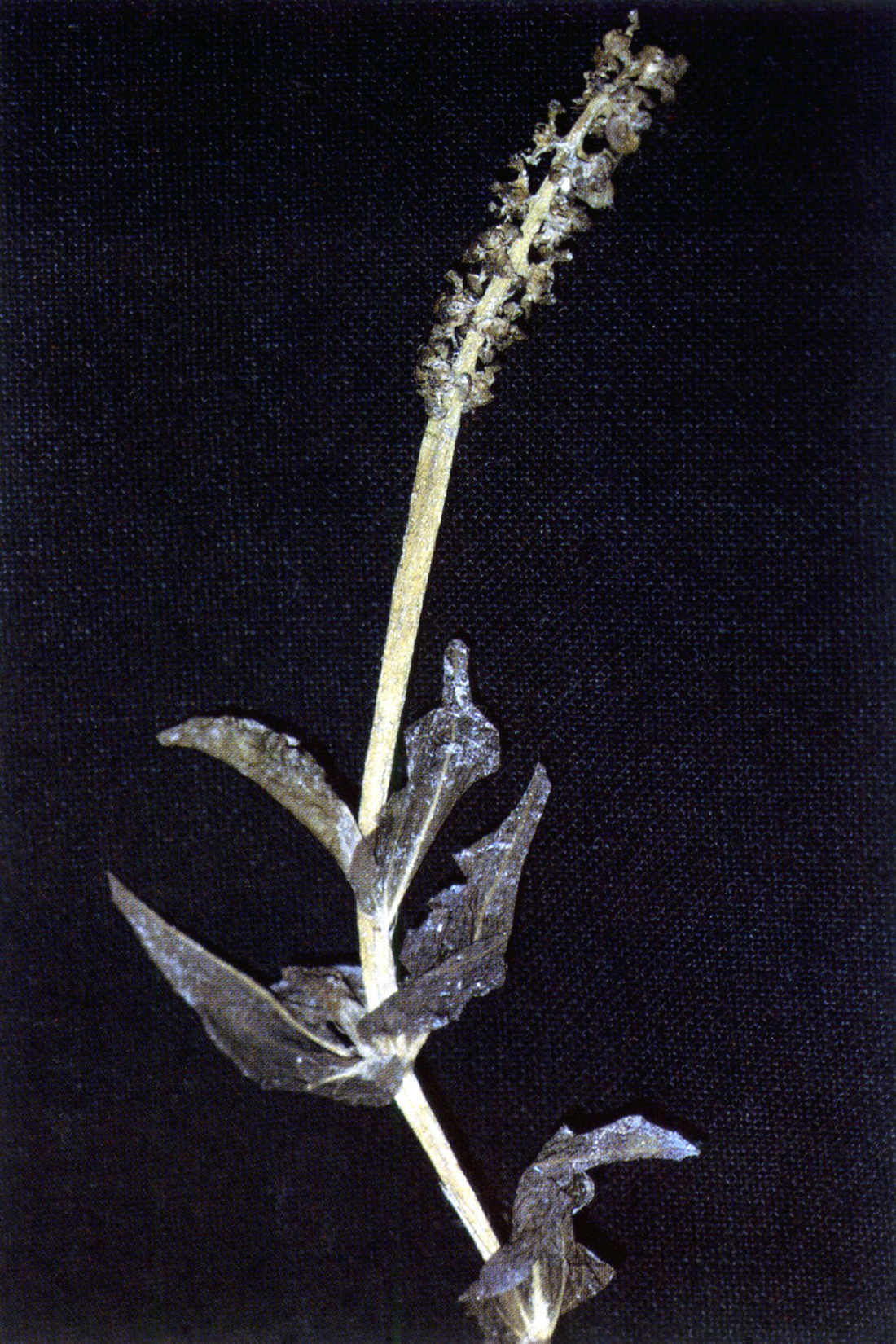

Scientific classification
- Kingdom: Plantae
- Clade: Tracheophytes
- Clade: Angiosperms
- Clade: Monocots
- Order: Alismatales
- Family: Potamogetonaceae
- Genus: Potamogeton
- Species: P. richardsonii

Binomial name
- Potamogeton richardsonii (Benn.) Rydb.

= Potamogeton richardsonii =

Species of aquatic plant

Potamogeton richardsonii is a species of aquatic plant known by the common name Richardson's pondweed. It is native to much of northern North America, including all of Canada and the northern and western United States. It grows in water bodies such as ponds, lakes, ditches, and streams. This perennial herb grows a narrow, mostly unbranched stem from a mat of rhizomes in the substrate. It reaches about a meter in maximum length. The leaves are up to 13 centimeters long and about 3 wide with crinkly pointed or rounded tips. The inflorescence is a spike of flowers arising from the water surface on a peduncle.
