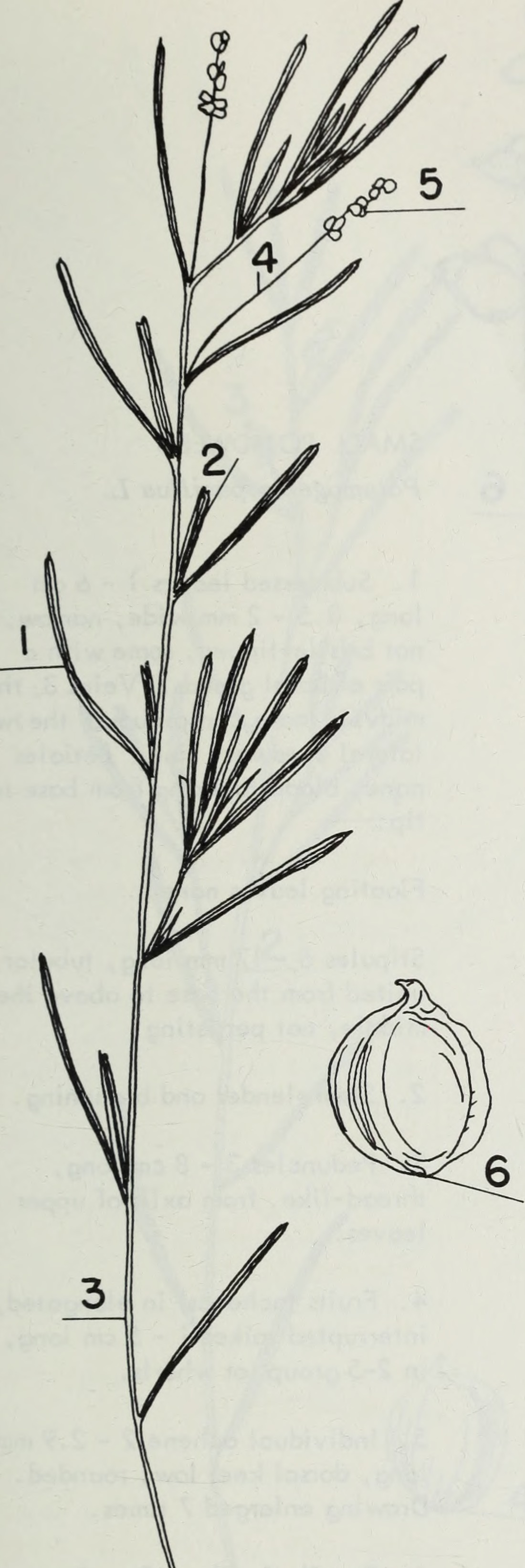

Scientific classification
- Kingdom: Plantae
- Clade: Tracheophytes
- Clade: Angiosperms
- Clade: Monocots
- Order: Alismatales
- Family: Potamogetonaceae
- Genus: Potamogeton
- Species: P. strictifolius

Binomial name
- Potamogeton strictifolius Benn.

= Potamogeton strictifolius =

Species of plant

Potamogeton strictifolius, common names straight-leaved pondweed, pondweed, straight-leaf pondweed, and narrow-leaved pondweed, is a species of plant found in North America. It is listed as endangered in Connecticut, Illinois, Indiana, Massachusetts, and in New York (state). It is listed as possibly extirpated in Maine, and presumed extirpated in Ohio.
