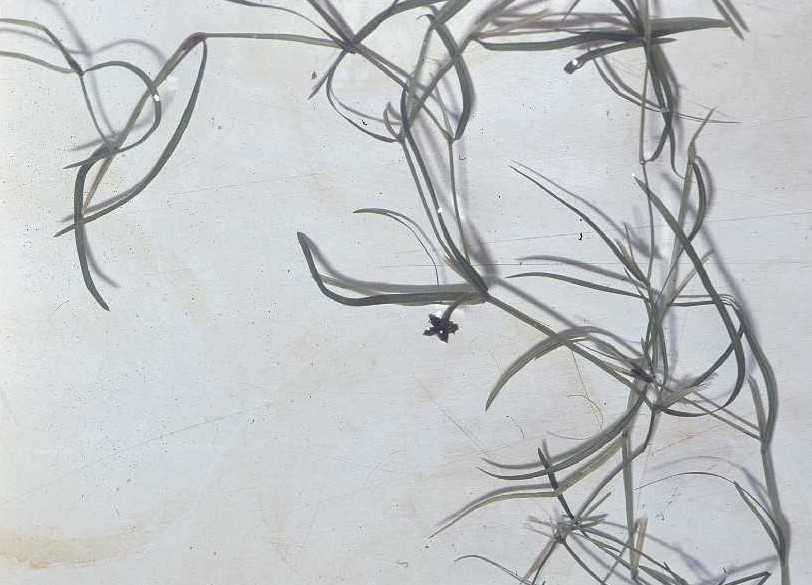

Scientific classification
- Kingdom: Plantae
- Clade: Tracheophytes
- Clade: Angiosperms
- Clade: Monocots
- Order: Alismatales
- Family: Potamogetonaceae
- Genus: Potamogeton
- Species: P. foliosus

Binomial name
- Potamogeton foliosus Raf.

Synonyms
- Potamogeton californicus (Morong) Piper; Potamogeton curtissii Morong; Potamogeton foliosus var. californicus (Morong) Morong; Potamogeton foliosus f. californicus (Morong) Hagstr.; Potamogeton foliosus var. genuinus Fernald; Potamogeton foliosus var. macellus Fernald; Potamogeton foliosus var. niagarensis (Tuck.) Morong; Potamogeton niagarensis Tuck.; Potamogeton pauciflorus Pursh; Potamogeton pauciflorus var. californicus Morong; Potamogeton pauciflorus var. niagarensis (Tuck.) A. Gray; Spirillus foliosus Lunell; Spirillus foliosus var. niagarensis (Tuck.) Nieuwl.

= Potamogeton foliosus =

Species of aquatic plant

Potamogeton foliosus is a species of aquatic plant known by the common name leafy pondweed. It is native to nearly all of North America and parts of Central America, where it grows in water bodies such as ponds, lakes, ditches, and slow-moving streams. It has been reported from every state in the United States except Hawaii as well as from every Canadian province and territory except Newfoundland and Nunavut.

Potamogeton foliosus is a perennial herb growing from a dense, mat-forming rhizome that anchors in wet substrate. It produces a thin, compressed, multibranched stem growing to a maximum length around 75 centimeters. The delicate, hairlike leaves are up to 10 centimeters long. They are pale green to olive green or reddish in color. The inflorescence is a small cluster or spike of flowers arising from the water on a short peduncle. Turions are sometimes present.
