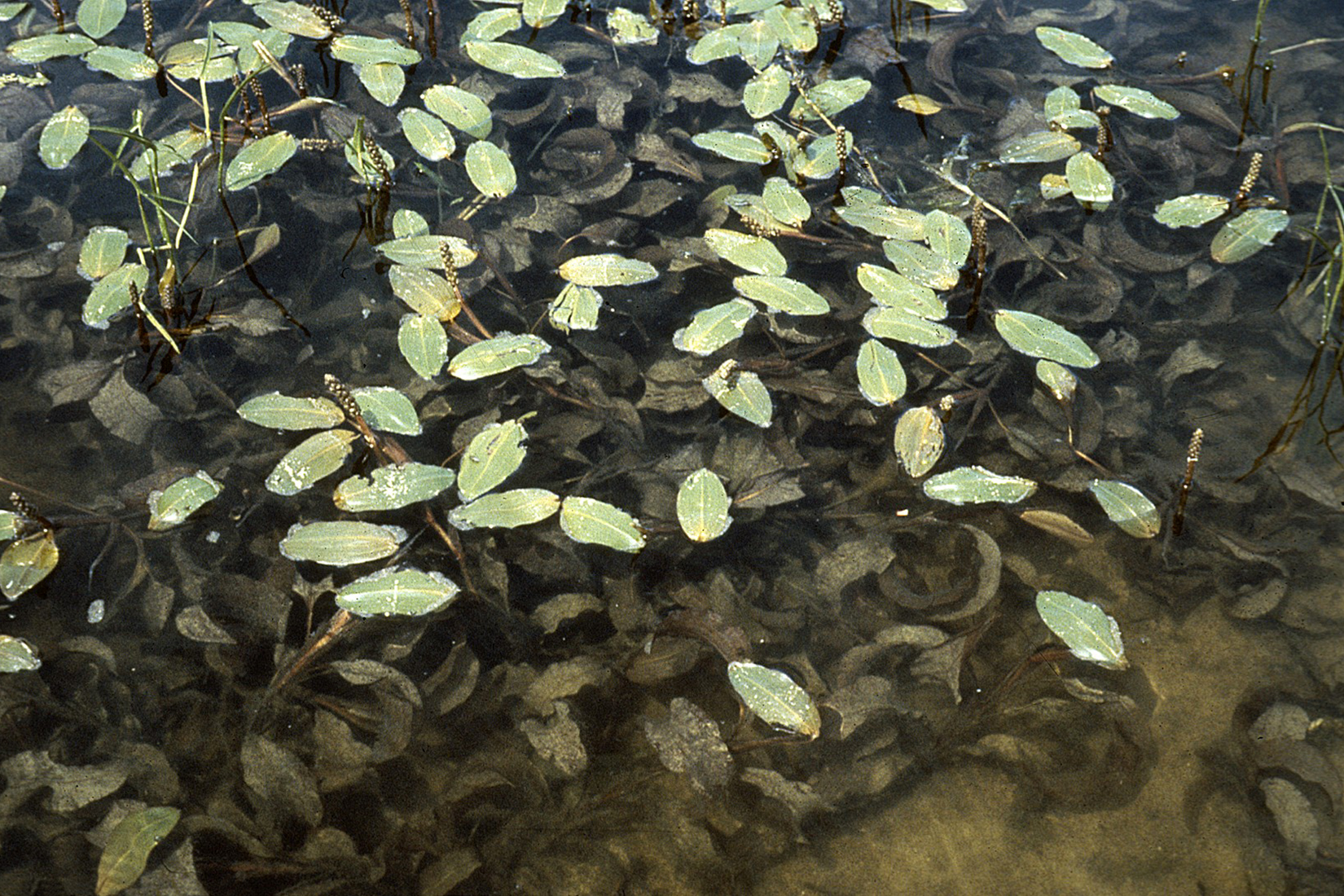

Scientific classification
- Kingdom: Plantae
- Clade: Tracheophytes
- Clade: Angiosperms
- Clade: Monocots
- Order: Alismatales
- Family: Potamogetonaceae
- Genus: Potamogeton
- Species: P. amplifolius

Binomial name
- Potamogeton amplifolius Tuck.

= Potamogeton amplifolius =

Species of aquatic plant

Potamogeton amplifolius, commonly known as largeleaf pondweed or broad-leaved pondweed, is an aquatic plant of North America. It grows in water bodies such as lakes, ponds, and rivers, often in deep water.

This perennial plant grows from rhizomes and produces a very slender, cylindrical, sometimes spotted stem up to a meter or so long. The leaves take two forms. Submersed leaves are up to 20 centimeters long by 7 wide and may be folded along their midribs. The submersed leaves have more veins than do those of other pondweed species, up to 49. Floating leaves are up to 10 centimeters long by 5 wide, leathery in texture, and borne on long petioles. The inflorescence is a spike of many flowers rising above the water surface on a thick peduncle.
