= Potamogeton quinquenervius =

Scientific classification
- Kingdom: Plantae
- Clade: Tracheophytes
- Clade: Angiosperms
- Clade: Monocots
- Order: Alismatales
- Family: Potamogetonaceae
- Genus: Potamogeton
- Species: P. quinquenervius

Binomial name
- Potamogeton quinquenervius Hagstr.

Species of herb

Potamogeton quinquenervius Hagstr. is an aquatic herb in the family Potamogetonaceae. It has a very widespread distribution in many riparian habitats.

Potamogeton quinquenervius Hagstr., Kungl. Svenska Vetenskapsakad. Handl. n. s. lv. No. 5, 130 (1916).
