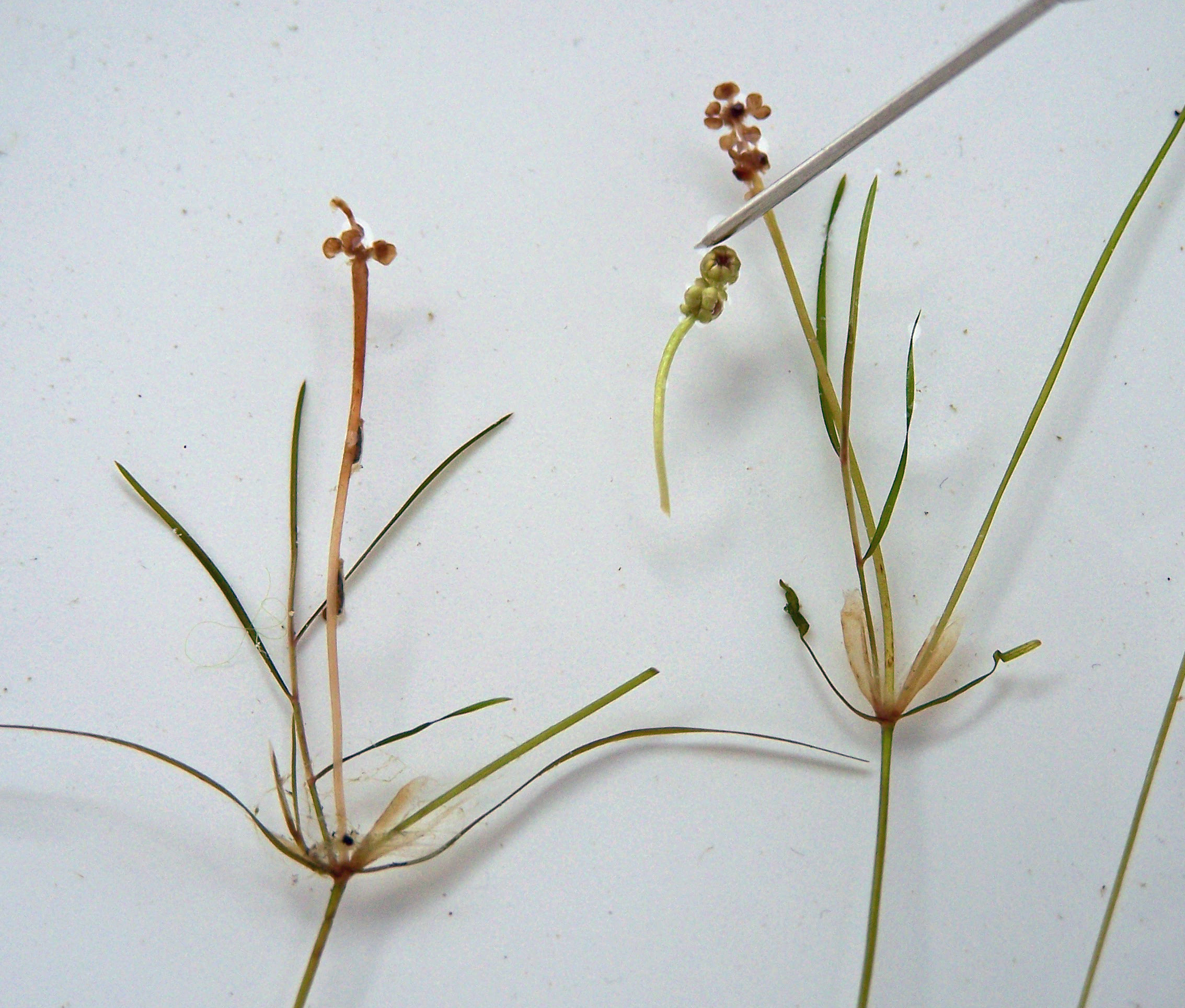

Conservation status
- Least Concern (IUCN 3.1)

Scientific classification
- Kingdom: Plantae
- Clade: Tracheophytes
- Clade: Angiosperms
- Clade: Monocots
- Order: Alismatales
- Family: Potamogetonaceae
- Genus: Potamogeton
- Species: P. trichoides

Binomial name
- Potamogeton trichoides Cham. et Schltdl. 1827

Synonyms
- Potamogeton baentzii Gand. Potamogeton condylocarpus Tausch Potamogeton danicus Gand. Potamogeton monogynus J.Gay Potamogeton orthorrhynchus Gand. Potamogeton perneglectus Gand. Potamogeton phialae Post Potamogeton tuberculatus Ten. & Guss.

= Potamogeton trichoides =

Species of aquatic plant

Potamogeton trichoides is a species of aquatic plant known by the common name hairlike pondweed, native to Europe and western Asia where it grows in calcareous, usually nutrient-rich standing or slow-flowing water.

== Description ==
Hairlike pondweed is an aquatic perennial that dies back each winter into a large number of asexually produced resting bodies called turions. There are no rhizomes. It produces slender, cylindrical or slightly compressed, branching stems usually less than a metre in length but occasionally up to 2 m. The submerged leaves are long and very narrow, typically 16–80 mm long and 0.3–1 mm wide, with the midrib occupying up to 70% of the width of the leaf near the base. They are rigid and green turning darker with age. There are no floating leaves.

The inflorescence is a short spike of 3–5 flowers arising from the water on a slender peduncle.

This species readily hybridizes with several other species of Potamogeton including P. berchtoldii (P. × franconicus G.Fisch.), P. pusillus (P. × grovesii Dandy & G.Taylor) and P. compressus (P. × ripoides Baagøe).

Hairlike pondweed is diploid, with 2n=26 chromosomes.

Hairlike pondweed is one of the more distinctive fine-leaved pondweeds due to the characteristically stiff leaves dominated by the midrib and open but tightly rolled stipules. However, it tends to be rarer than other fine-leaved species and often grows in mixed beds with other fine-leaved water plants such as P. pusillus and Zannichellia palustris, so it may be overlooked.

== Taxonomy ==
Potamogeton trichoides (trichoides = 'hairlike') was named by the German botanists Adelbert von Chamisso and Diederich Franz Leonhard von Schlechtendal in 1827.

Hairlike pondweed is one of the fine-leaved pondweed clade (series Graminifolii), and related to similar species such as P. pusillus.

== Distribution ==
Potamogeton trichoides is native to the western Palaearctic and Africa. It occurs in northern Europe (Austria, Britain, Czech Republic, Denmark, France, Germany, Italy (including Sicily), Norway, Spain, Sweden, Switzerland, Poland, Russia, the Baltic States), North Africa (Morocco, Algeria, Tunisia, Libya, Egypt), eastern and southern Africa (South Africa, Tanzania, Uganda, Zimbabwe). There are outlying populations in the Canaries, the Caucasus, and Russia east of the Urals.

== Ecology and conservation ==
Hairlike pondweed grows predominantly in standing water including ponds, lakes, ditches, canals and slow-flowing rivers and streams. It is usually restricted to calcareous water of rather high conductivity and is tolerant of high nutrient levels. It is often an early succession species, colonising newly created habitats such as ditches and flooded gravel pits, but sometimes is abundant in alkaline, low altitude lakes. It often grows with other nutrient tolerant macrophytes such as Myriophyllum spicatum, Potamogeton crispus, P. pusillus and Ranunculus circinatus.

In Britain, hairlike pondweed is thought to be stable or possibly increasing. However, it is placed in various threat categories in parts of its range, for example it is Vulnerable in the Czech Republic, and Germany (although still widespread along all major river systems there), and Critically Endangered in Switzerland.

== Cultivation ==
Potamogeton trichoides is not in general cultivation, and is of little garden merit.
