= Potamogeton × inbaensis =

Scientific classification
- Kingdom: Plantae
- Clade: Tracheophytes
- Clade: Angiosperms
- Clade: Monocots
- Order: Alismatales
- Family: Potamogetonaceae
- Genus: Potamogeton
- Species: P. × inbaensis

Binomial name
- Potamogeton × inbaensis Kadono

Species of aquatic plant

Potamogeton × inbaensis is an inter-species hybrid in the genus Potamogeton. It is found in slow-moving fresh water.

The species is fully submerged. The hybrid was described in 1983 in Chiba Pref. Japan as an interspecific hybrid between P. lucens and P. malaianus (syn. P. wrightii), and then genetically confirmed the hybridity as well as parental combinations. This hybrid is also found in China.

It is known to be a sterile hybrid.
