= Potamogeton ogdenii =

Scientific classification
- Kingdom: Plantae
- Clade: Tracheophytes
- Clade: Angiosperms
- Clade: Monocots
- Order: Alismatales
- Family: Potamogetonaceae
- Genus: Potamogeton
- Species: P. ogdenii

Binomial name
- Potamogeton ogdenii Hellquist & Hilton

Species of flowering plant

Potamogeton ogdenii, common name Ogden's pondweed, is a perennial plant native to North America.

== Conservation status in the United States ==
It is listed as endangered in Connecticut, Massachusetts, and New York.
