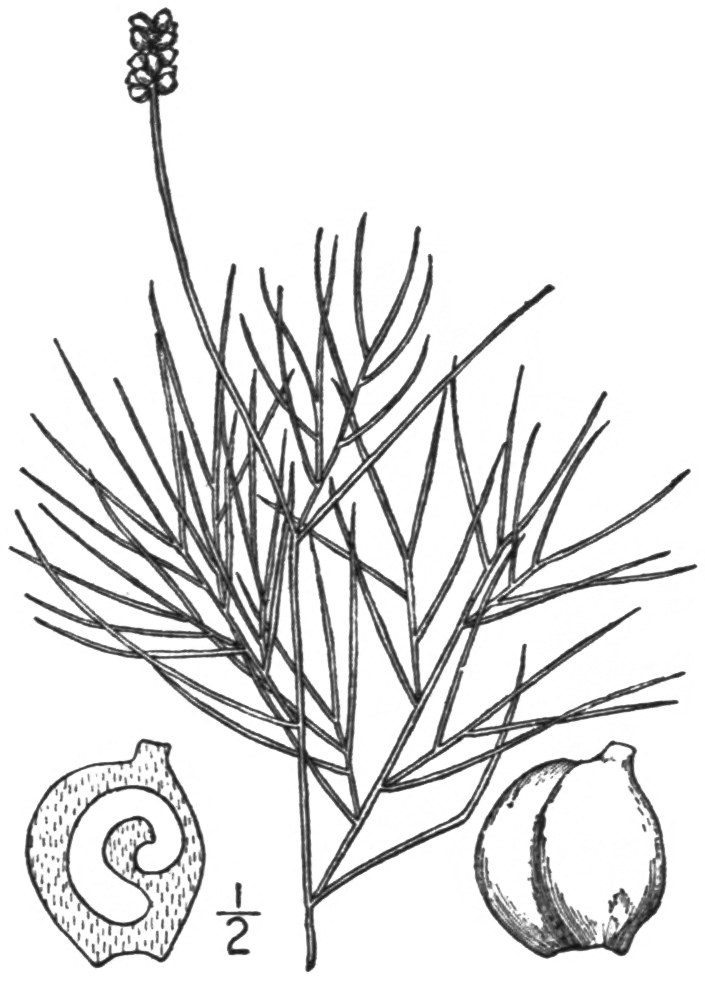

Scientific classification
- Kingdom: Plantae
- Clade: Tracheophytes
- Clade: Angiosperms
- Clade: Monocots
- Order: Alismatales
- Family: Potamogetonaceae
- Genus: Potamogeton
- Species: P. confervoides

Binomial name
- Potamogeton confervoides Rchb.

Synonyms
- Potamogeton trichoides Tuck.; Potamogeton tuckermanii J.W.Robbins; Potamogeton tuckermanii J.W.Robbins ex A.Gray

= Potamogeton confervoides =

Species of plant

Potamogeton confervoides, common names pondweed, alga-like pondweed, algae-like pondweed, and Tuckerman's pondweed is a species of plant found in North America. It is listed as endangered in Connecticut, as a special concern in Maine, as threatened in Massachusetts, New York (state), Pennsylvania, and Wisconsin. It is listed as historical in Rhode Island.
