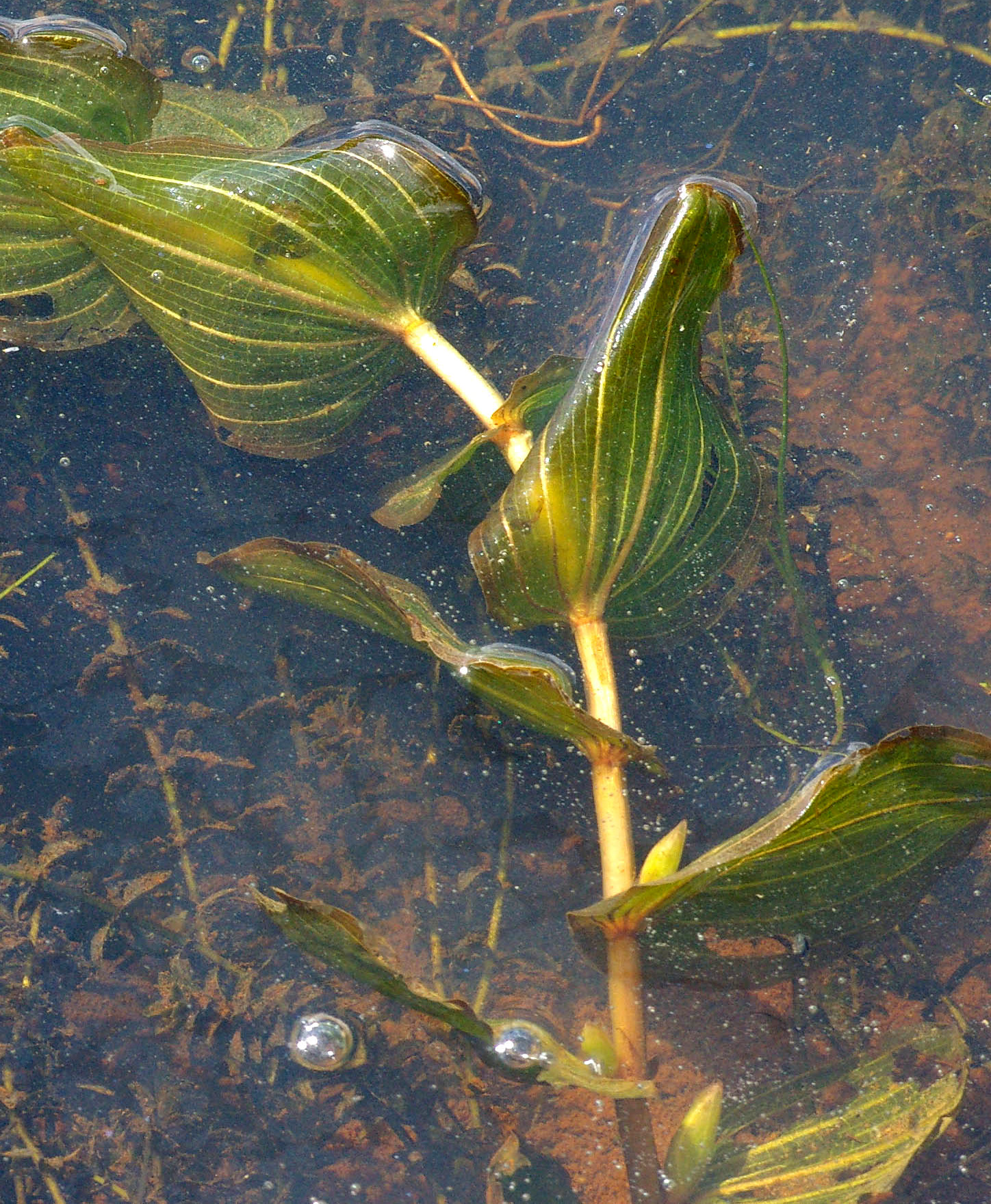
- Potamogeton perfoliatus

Scientific classification
- Kingdom: Plantae
- Clade: Tracheophytes
- Clade: Angiosperms
- Clade: Monocots
- Order: Alismatales
- Family: Potamogetonaceae
- Genus: Potamogeton; L.

Species
- 80–100, see text

= Potamogeton =

Genus of aquatic plants

Potamogeton is a genus of aquatic, mostly freshwater, plants of the family Potamogetonaceae. Most are known by the common name pondweed, although many unrelated plants may be called pondweed, such as Canadian pondweed (Elodea canadensis). The genus name means "river neighbor", originating from the Greek potamos (river) and geiton (neighbor).

== Morphology ==
Potamogeton species range from large (stems of 6 m or more) to very small (less than 10 cm). Height is strongly influenced by environmental conditions, particularly water depth. All species are technically perennial, but some species disintegrate in autumn to a large number of asexually produced resting buds called turions, which serve both as a means of overwintering and dispersal. Turions may be borne on the rhizome, on the stem, or on stolons from the rhizome. Most species, however, persist by perennial creeping rhizomes. In some cases the turions are the only means to differentiate species.

The leaves are alternate, which contrasts with the closely related genus Groenlandia, where the leaves are opposite or whorled. In many species, all the leaves are submerged, and in these cases, they are typically thin and translucent. Some species, especially in ponds and very slow-moving waters, have floating leaves which tend to be opaque with a leathery texture. Leaf shape has been found to be highly plastic, with variability due to changes in light, water chemistry, planting depth, sediment conditions, temperature, photo period, waves, and seasonality. All Potamogeton have a delicate membranous sheathing scale, the stipule, at the leaf axil. This may be wholly attached, partly attached, or free of the leaf, and it may have inrolled margins or appear as a tube. The morphology of the stipule is an important character for species identification. The stems have small scales.

The flowers, which are often overlooked, are greenish-brown and are composed of four rounded segments borne in a spike. They are 2–4 merous, with superior ovaries and anthers that turn outward. The fruits are spheroidal and green to brown, usually 1–3 mm in diameter, with a noticeable 'beak'. Their pollen is inaperturate, monad, apolar and spherical.

Most fine-leaved pondweeds are diploid, with 2n = 26 (such as P. pusillus or P. trichoides) or less commonly 28 (P. compressus, P. acutifolius). Broad-leaved taxa are mainly tetraploid, with 2n = 52 (e.g. P. alpinus, P. praelongus), but a few species are diploid (e.g. P. coloratus or octaploid (2n = 104; e.g. P. illinoensis).

== Taxonomy ==
Potamogeton is a genus of freshwater aquatic plants in the Potamogetonaceae. Molecular analysis has identified Groenlandia as the sister group to Potamogeton, although the Angiosperm Phylogeny Group also lists Zannichellia, Althenia and Pseudoalthenia as closely related genera. Some researchers have used molecular analysis and pollen grain shape to argue for the placement of Stuckenia at the genus level, but others have argued there is not enough difference to justify the change, and have kept Stuckenia as a subgenus of Potamogeton.

The genus is generally divided into two groups: broad-leaved and linear-leaved. The broad-leaved group includes such species as P. natans, P. perfoliatus and P. alpinus. The linear-leaved group includes such species as P. rutilus, P. compressus and P. berchtoldii. Series Batrachoseris historically contained only one species, Potamogeton crispus, however more recent research has also added P. maackianus and P. robbinsii into this grouping. These general divisions have been supported by molecular analysis, except that P. crispus clusters with broad-leaved species in section Potamogeton.

In a detailed review of the genus, Wiegleb and Kaplan recognised 69 species, but the variability of many species means that there is disagreement regarding the exact number of species. Currently, the number of accepted names is 94. Hybridisation provides an added complexity to the taxonomy.

== Distribution ==
Potamogeton species are found worldwide in many aquatic ecosystems. However, the greatest diversity of species occurs in the northern hemisphere, especially in North America, which is thought to be where the genus originated. Molecular evidence suggests that several independent colonizations of the southern hemisphere have occurred. However, due to their self-propagation from turions, Potamogeton populations show very low infrapopulation diversity, especially when living in deep, shaded or turbulent water where colonies do not expend energy on flowers. This has made it very difficult to use genetic data to find patterns of geographical differentiation.

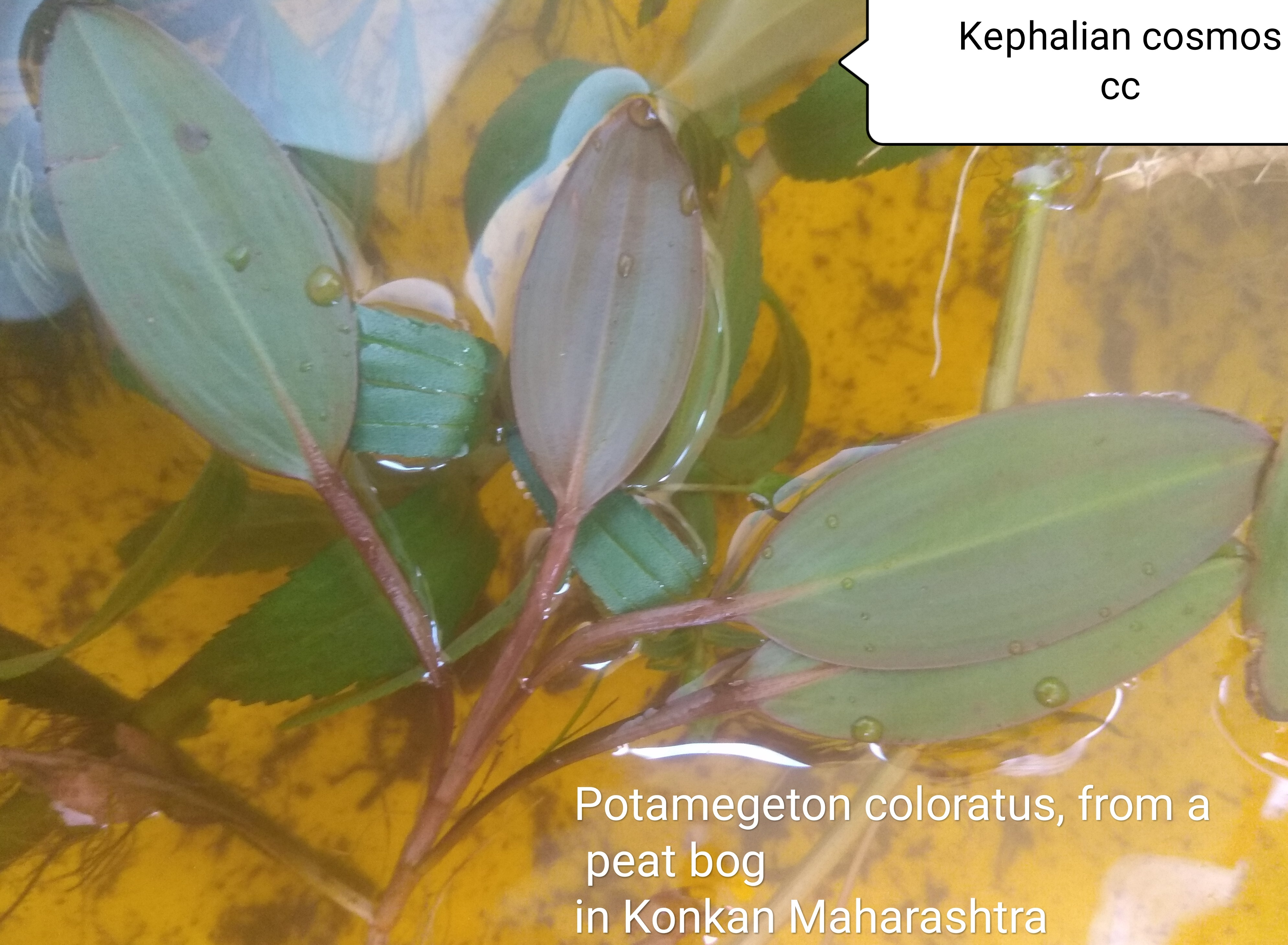
Potamegeton coloratus from a peat bog in Konkan, Maharashtra State of India

== Hybrids ==
Potamogeton species hybridise freely. At least 27 hybrids have been observed in the British Isles alone, and more than 50 worldwide, of which 36 have been confirmed using genetic techniques. The majority of these are sterile, but many are long-lived and may occur in the absence of one or even both parents. Most hybrids have been described between broad-leaved species, but this probably reflects the relative scarcity of characters among fine-leaved taxa, so that hybrids are much more difficult to identify. Use of genetic markers suggests that hybrid taxa are also reasonably frequent among fine-leaved species. At least one species, P. obtusifolius, is thought to have arisen via hybridisation.

== Taxonomic history ==
Several species of European pondweeds, including P. natans, P. lucens and P. crispus, were included in Linnaeus's Species Plantarum in 1753. Much of the European Potamogeton flora was subsequently named during the late 18th and early 19th century. As botanists ventured further afield, pondweeds began to be collected and named from other parts of the world. The North America flora was largely named by the start of the 20th century. Alfred Fryer became interested in Potamogeton in the 1880s, and was a recognised authority on the genus. The first parts of his work The Potamogetons (Pond Weeds) of the British Isles were published in 1898. His death intervened, and the work was completed by Arthur Bennett (1843-1929), who named a large number of specimens sent to him from around the world. Robert Morgan (1863-1900) illustrated Fryer's contribution to the monograph, his colour plates drawing praise from later critics.

In 1916, Johan Hagström published Critical researches on the Potamogetons from detailed measurements of dozens of vegetative, anatomical and reproductive characteristics such as fruit beak, peduncle rigidity and leaf apex across hundreds of specimens. It was a pioneering work that preceded the development of cladistics by more than 30 years, and his clustering of groups into broad-leaf and linear-leaf is still considered the framework for all subsequent classification systems of Potamogeton. Hagström's work was developed further by Merritt Fernald (1873-1950) who created a detailed phylogeny for the linear-leaved species, and by Eugene Ogden who did so for the broad-leaved species.

New species continue to be described from less well-studied areas such as Asia and Africa, and it is possible that molecular analysis may reveal hitherto unknown cryptic species.

=== List of Potamogeton species ===
The following list is based on the latest listing of valid Potamogeton taxa held on The Plant List.

- P. acutifolius Link ex Roem. & Schult. 1818
- P. alpinus Balb. 1804
- P. amplifolius Tuck. 1848
- P. antaicus Hagstr. 1916
- P. australiensis A.Benn. 1910
- P. berchtoldii Fieber 1838
- P. bicupulatus Fernald 1932
- P. biformis Hagstr. 1916
- P. brasiliensis A.Benn. 1910
- P. chamissoi A.Benn. 1904
- P. cheesemanii A.Benn. 1883
- P. chongyangensis W.X.Wang 1984
- P. coloratus Hornem. 1813
- P. compressus L. 1753
- P. confervoides Rchb. 1845
- P. crispus L. 1753
- P. cristatus Regel & Maack, 1861
- P. delavayi A.Benn. 1892
- P. distinctus A. Benn. 1904
- P. diversifolius Raf. 1811
- P. drummondii Benth. 1878
- P. epihydrus Raf. 1811
- P. ferrugineus Hagstr. 1916
- P. floridanus Small 1903
- P. foliosus Raf. 1811
- P. fontigenus Y.H.Guo, X.Z.Sun & H.Q.Wang 1985
- P. friesii Rupr. 1845
- P. fryeri A.Benn. 1907
- P. gayi A.Benn. 1892
- P. gemmiparus Robbins
- P. gramineus L. 1753
- P. heterocaulis Z.S.Diao 1994
- P. hillii Morong 1881
- P. hoggarensis Dandy 1937
- P. illinoensis Morong 1880
- P. intortusifolius J.B.He, L.Y.Zhou & H.Q.Wang 1988
- P. iriomotensis Masam. 1934
- P. juzepczukii P.I.Dorof. & Tzvelev 1983
- P. kashiensis Z.S.Diao 1995
- P. lacunatifolius Papch. 2001
- P. linguatus Hagstr. 1901
- P. lucens L. 1753
- P. maackianus A.Benn. 1904
- P. mandschuriensis (A.Benn.) A.Benn. 1924
- P. marianensis Cham. & Schltdl. 1827
- P. montevidensis A.Benn. 1892
- P. nanus Y.D.Chen 1987
- P. natans L. 1753
- P. nodosus Poir. 1816
- P. nomotoensis Kadono & T.Nog. 1991
- P. oakesianus J.W.Robbins 1867
- P. obtusifolius Mert. & W.D.J.Koch 1823
- P. ochreatus Raoul 1844
- P. octandrus Poir. 1816
- P. ogdenii Hellq. & R.L.Hilton 1983
- P. oxyphyllus Miq. 1867
- P. papuanicus G.Wiegleb 1993
- P. paramoanus R.R.Haynes & Holm-Niels. 1982
- P. parmatus Hagstr. 1908
- P. perfoliatus L. 1753
- P. polygonifolius Pourr. 1788
- P. polygonus Cham. & Schltdl. 1827
- P. praelongus Wulfen 1805
- P. pulcher Tuck. 1843
- P. punense A.Galán 1988
- P. pusillus L. 1753
- P. quinquenervius Hagstr. 1916
- P. reniacoensis Sparre 1956
- P. richardii Solms 1867
- P. richardsonii (A.Benn.) Rydb. 1905
- P. robbinsii Oakes 1841
- P. rutilus Wolfg. 1827
- P. sarmaticus Mäemets 1978 publ. 1979
- P. schweinfurthii A.Benn. 1901
- P. sclerocarpus K.Schum. 1894
- P. sibiricus A.Benn. 1890
- P. skvortsovii Klinkova 1993
- P. solomonensis G.Wiegleb 1993
- P. spathuliformis (J.W.Robbins) Morong 1893
- P. spirilliformis Hagstr. 1916
- P. spirillus Tuck. 1848
- P. stenostachys K.Schum. 1894
- P. strictifolius A.Benn. 1902
- P. subnitens Hagstr. 1916
- P. suboblongus Hagstr. 1916
- P. sumatranus Miq. 1861
- P. tennesseensis Fernald 1936
- P. tepperi A.Benn. 1887
- P. tricarinatus F.Muell. & A.Benn. 1892
- P. trichoides Cham. & Schltdl. 1827
- P. tubulatus Hagstr. 1922
- P. ulei K.Schum. 1894
- P. uruguayensis A.Benn. & Graebn.
- P. vaseyi J.W.Robbins 1867
- P. wrightii Morong 1886

=== List of Potamogeton hybrids ===
- P. × anguillanus Koidz.
- P. × angustifolius J.Presl
- P. × apertus Miki
- P. × argutulus Hagstr.
- P. × attenuatus Hagstr.
- P. × babingtonii A.Benn.
- P. × billupsii Fryer
- P. × cadburyae Dandy & G.Taylor
- P. × cognatus Asch. & Graebn.
- P. × cooperi (Fryer) Fryer
- P. × concilius
- P. × faurei (A.Benn.) Miki
- P. × fluitans Roth
- P. × franconicus G.Fisch.
- P. × gessnacensis G.Fisch.
- P. × griffithii A.Benn.
- P. × grovesii Dandy & G.Taylor
- P. × haynesii Hellq. & G.E.Crow
- P. × inbaensis Kadono
- P. × kamogawaensis Miki
- P. × kyushuensis Kadono & Wiegleb
- P. × lanceolatifolius (Tiselius) C.D.Preston
- P. × lanceolatus Sm.
- P. × leptocephalus Koidz.
- P. × lintonii Fryer
- P. × malainoides Miki
- P. × mariensis Papch.
- P. × mysticus Morong
- P. × nericius Hagstr.
- P. × nerviger Wolfg.
- P. × nitens Weber
- P. × olivaceus Baagøe ex G.Fisch.
- P. × orientalis Hagstr.
- P. × philippinensis A.Benn.
- P. × prussicus Hagstr.
- P. × pseudofriesii Dandy & G.Taylor
- P. × rectifolius A.Benn.
- P. × salicifolius Wolfg.
- P. × schreberi G.Fisch.
- P. × scoliophyllus Hagstr.
- P. × sparganiifolius Laest. ex Fr.
- P. × spathulatus Schrad. ex W.D.J.Koch & Ziz
- P. × subsessilis Hagstr.
- P. × sudermanicus Hagstr.
- P. × undulatus Wolfg.
- P. × vaginans (Bojer ex A.Benn.) Hagstr.
- P. × varians Morong
- P. × variifolius Thore
- P. × vepsicus A.A.Bobrov & Chemeris

List source :

== Ecology ==
Reproduction of pondweeds occurs both vegetatively and by seed, though studies suggest that in some species or situations reproduction by seed is rare. The fruits may be produced in large quantities from midsummer onwards, and are ingested by waterfowl. Germination experiments have shown that the seeds are viable after passing through the digestive tracts of birds and this mechanism is probably the only natural mechanism for long-distance dispersal between isolated water bodies. Vegetative propagation occurs by a variety of mechanisms including turions, and via growth and fragmentation of rhizomes and shoots. Vegetative reproduction is evidently an effective means of ensuring local persistence, as sterile hybrids have been recorded at some sites for over 100 years.

Although they occur in a range of environments, most species prefer standing or slow-flowing waters with some calcium and fairly low nutrient levels. In general the fine-leaved species are more tolerant of human impacts such as eutrophication. They are important as food and habitat for animals including insect larvae, water snails, ducks and other waterfowl, and aquatic mammals such as beavers.

Most species are not weedy, but a few can become troublesome, such as curly-leaf pondweed (Potamogeton crispus).

In relation to the ecosystem as a whole, Potamogeton is often a common habitat for insects. For example, C. annularius and other insects from the Chironomus genera have been found to inhabit and mate around certain species of Potamogeton. The closeness to a fresh water source as well as cover from predators allows C. annularius to thrive.
