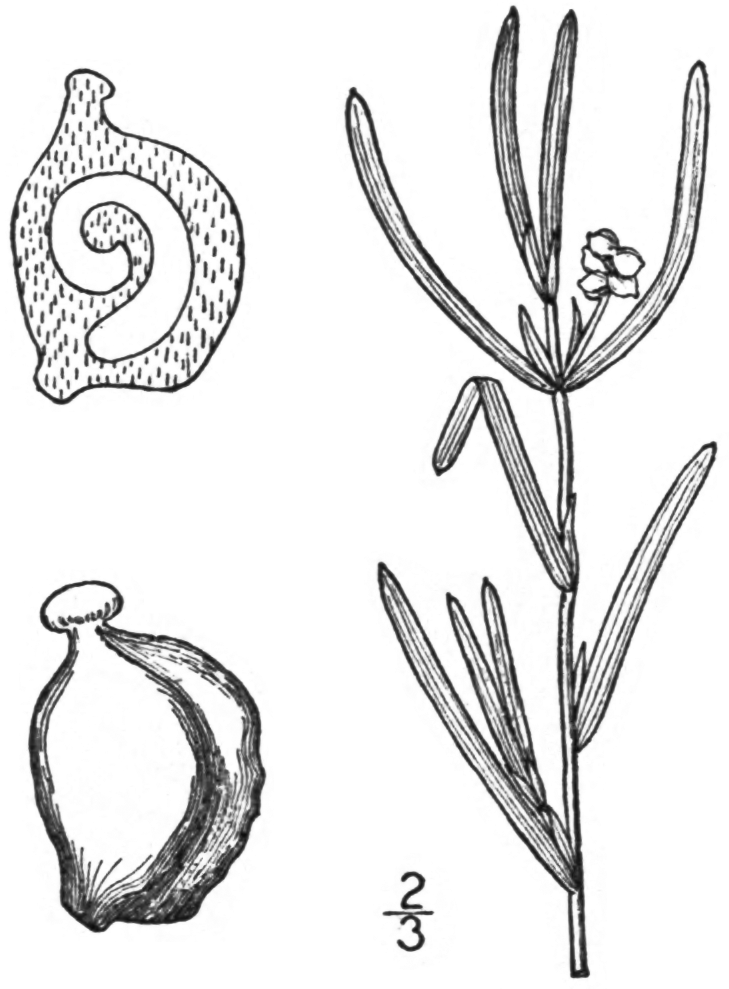

Scientific classification
- Kingdom: Plantae
- Clade: Tracheophytes
- Clade: Angiosperms
- Clade: Monocots
- Order: Alismatales
- Family: Potamogetonaceae
- Genus: Potamogeton
- Species: P. hillii

Binomial name
- Potamogeton hillii Morong

= Potamogeton hillii =

Species of plant

Potamogeton hillii, common name Hill's pondweed, is a species of plant found in North America. It is listed as endangered in Connecticut, Ohio, and Pennsylvania. It is listed as a special concern in Massachusetts and as threatened in Michigan and New York (state).

Commonly found in alkaline waters, Hill's pondweed has a narrow distribution from Wisconsin to western New England (Connecticut, Massachusetts and Vermont).

== Description ==
The leaves of Potamogeton hillii tend to be around 20–60 mm, all of which are submerged underwater. The fruit is fleshy and dry but does not split open when ripe. The fruit is also 2.3–4 mm in length and 2–3.2 mm in width. The flower blooms in mid-July through August, fruiting late-July through August.

== History ==
Hill's pondweed was first collected in New York in 1886 in Cayuga Lake near Ithaca. The name honors the Reverend E.J. Hill who discovered it in Michigan in 1880.
