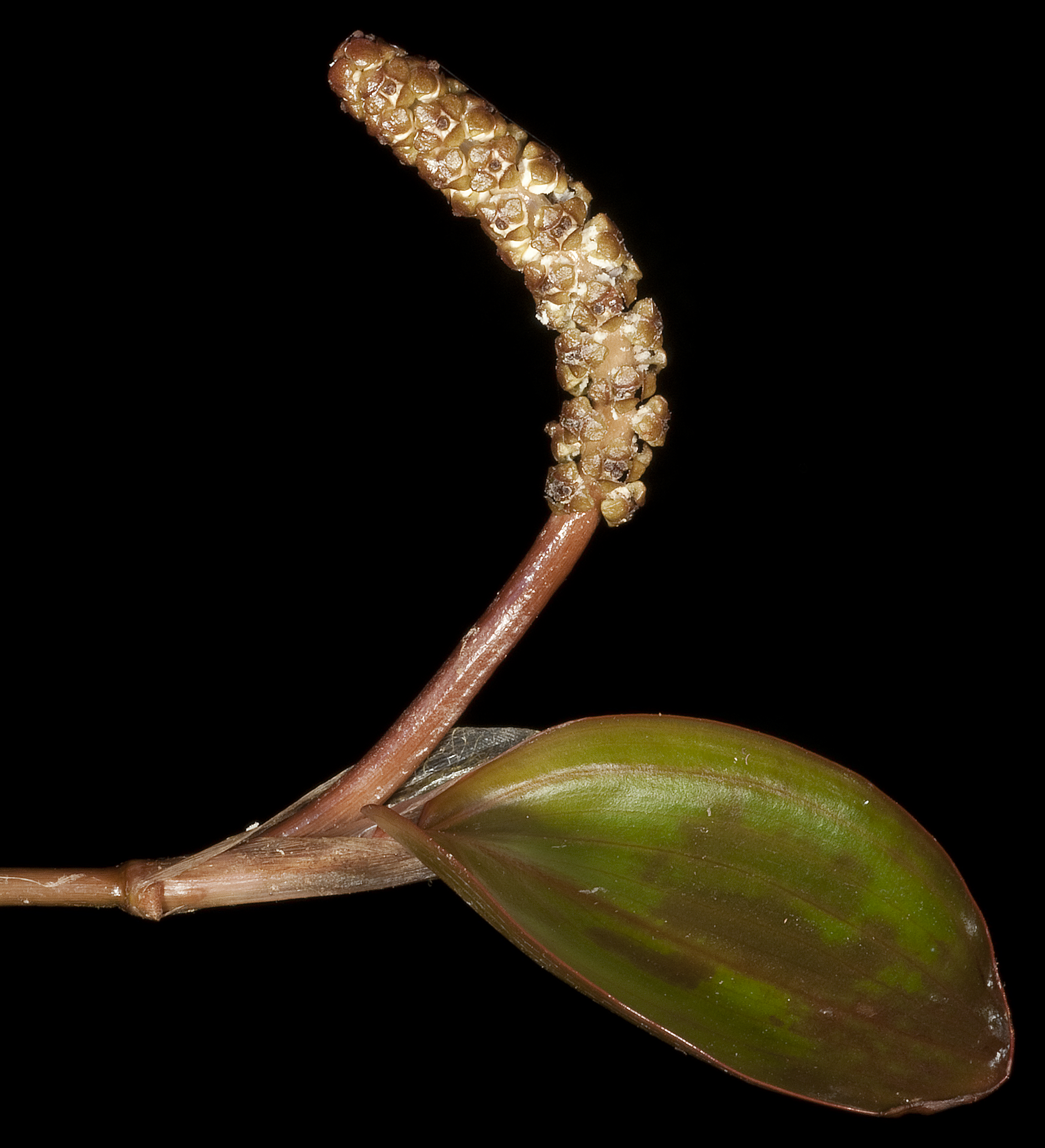

Scientific classification
- Kingdom: Plantae
- Clade: Tracheophytes
- Clade: Angiosperms
- Clade: Monocots
- Order: Alismatales
- Family: Potamogetonaceae
- Genus: Potamogeton
- Species: P. tepperi

Binomial name
- Potamogeton tepperi A.Benn.

= Potamogeton tepperi =

Species of plant native to Australia

Potamogeton tepperi is a water herb, belonging to the Potamogetonaceae family in the order Alismatales.

== Taxonomy ==
The species was first described in 1887 by the British botanist, Arthur Bennett, from a specimen collected by Frederick Manson Bailey from a pool 500 miles north of Brisbane, and another collected from a river in South Australia by Johann Gottlieb Otto Tepper (who is honoured in the species epithet).

== Description ==
It is an aquatic, rhizomatous perennial herb which has both submerged and floating leaves. The stems are terete and up to 3 m (9.8 ft) long. Stipules convolute, free from the base of leaf blade. Both submerged leaves and floating leaves are petiolate with lanceolate blades. The Inflorescence is a terminal spike up to 5 cm (2.0 in) long which emerges above the water. The peduncles are erect, and recurved when fruiting. The fruit is reddish, brownish or green and keeled with a prominent beak. It flowers and fruits in the dry season.

== Distribution and habitat ==
In Australia it has been found in Western Australia, South Australia, and Queensland, in warm and permanent waters.
