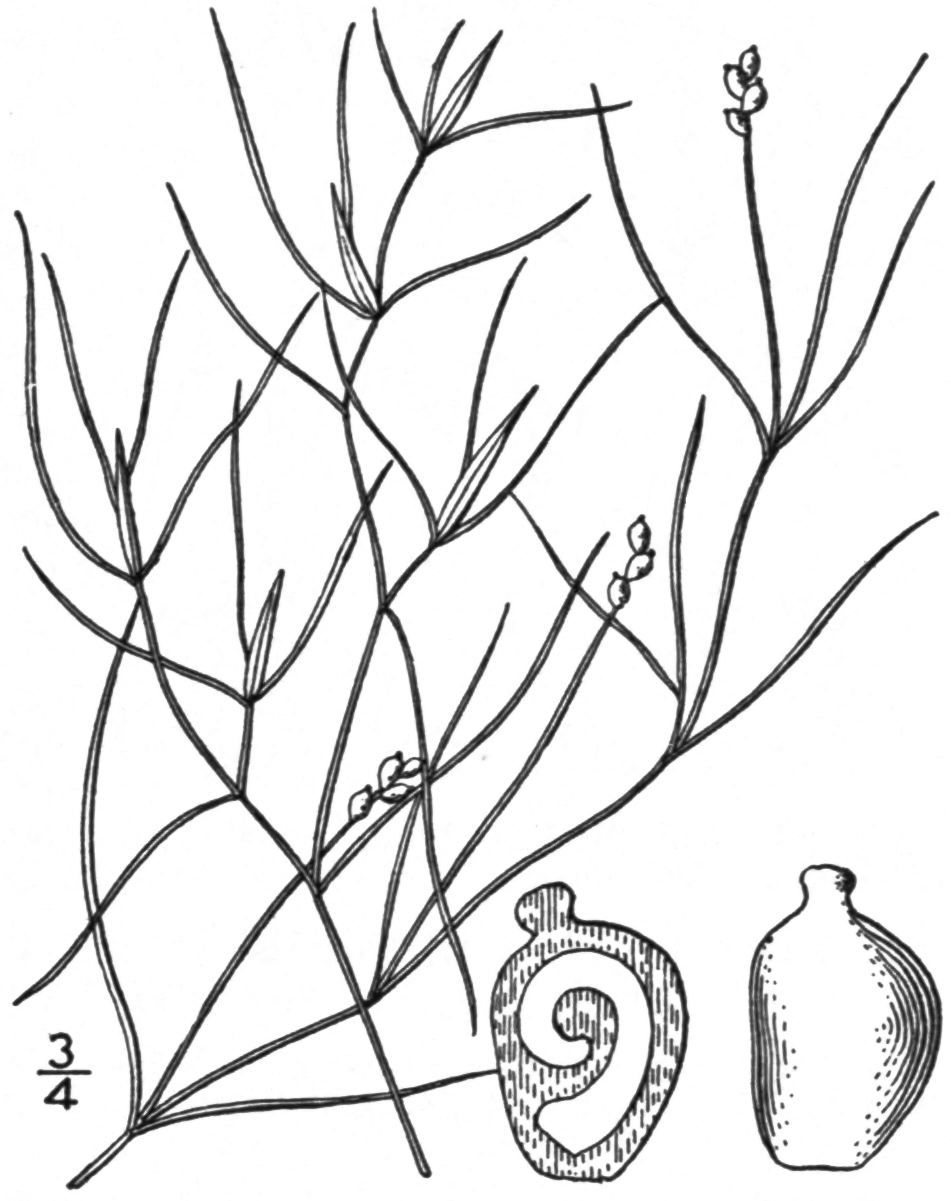

Scientific classification
- Kingdom: Plantae
- Clade: Tracheophytes
- Clade: Angiosperms
- Clade: Monocots
- Order: Alismatales
- Family: Potamogetonaceae
- Genus: Potamogeton
- Species: P. gemmiparus

Binomial name
- Potamogeton gemmiparus (J.W. Robbins) J.W. Robbins ex Morong

Synonyms
- Potamogeton pusillus var. gemmiparus

= Potamogeton gemmiparus =

Species of plant

Potamogeton gemmiparus, is a species of plant found in North America. It is also known as Potamogeton pusillus var. gemmiparus, common names capillary pondweed, slender pondweed, and budding pondweed. It is listed as threatened in Connecticut and in New Hampshire, as rare in Indiana, and as a special concern in Rhode Island.
