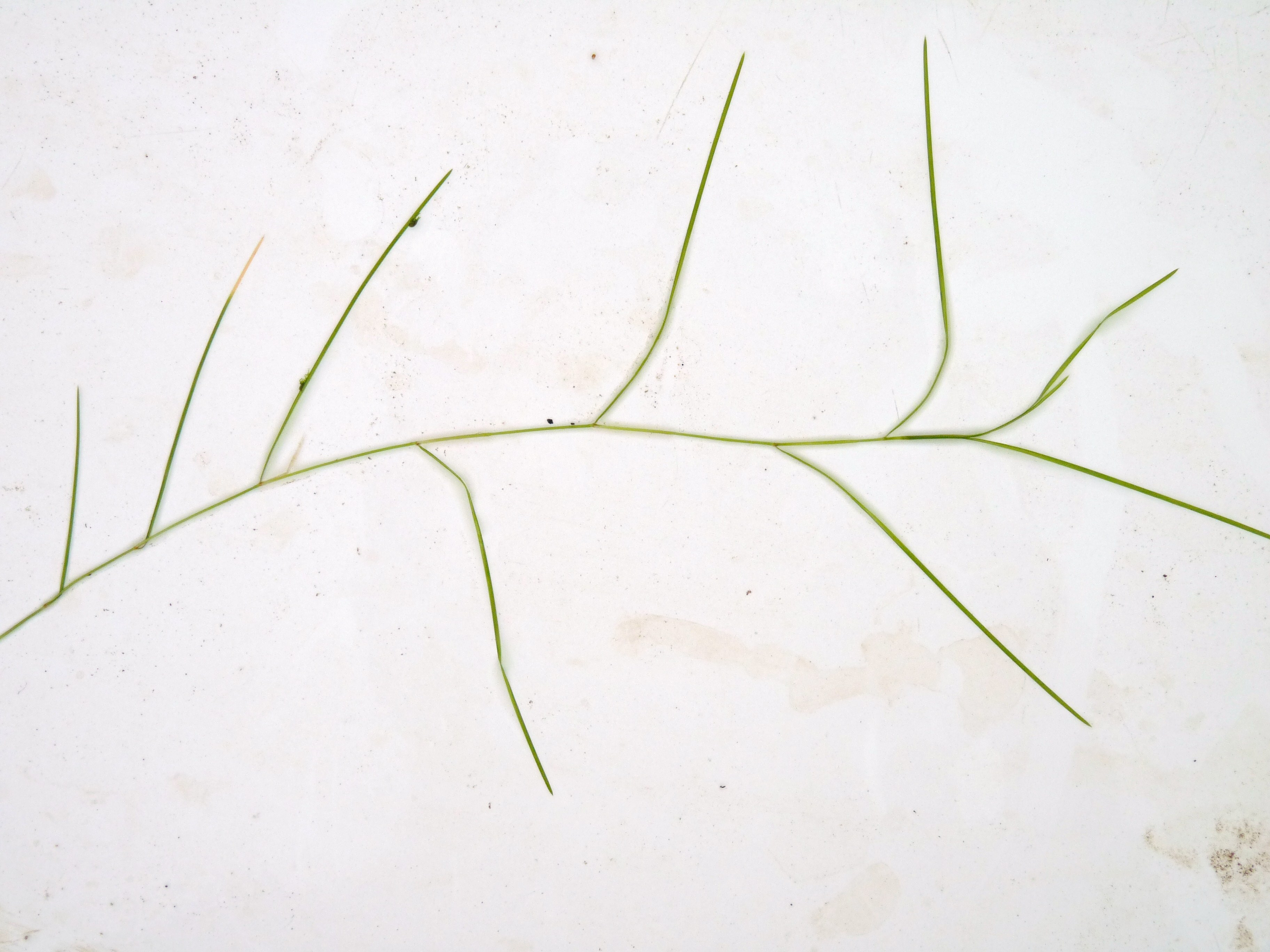

Scientific classification
- Kingdom: Plantae
- Clade: Tracheophytes
- Clade: Angiosperms
- Clade: Monocots
- Order: Alismatales
- Family: Potamogetonaceae
- Genus: Potamogeton
- Species: P. octandrus

Binomial name
- Potamogeton octandrus Poir.

= Potamogeton octandrus =

Species of aquatic plant

Potamogeton octandrus is an aquatic plant species in the genus Potamogeton. It is found in slow-moving fresh water. The specific epithet means 'eight-stamened'.

== Distribution and habitat ==
This is a common plant in lakes and ponds. It is known from Africa, Asia (Russian Far East, Mongolia, Korea, Japan, China, Taiwan, Pakistan, India, Nepal, Bhutan, Myanmar, Thailand, Vietnam (type), Indonesia (type of P. javanicus), and Papua New Guinea), and Australia (type of P. tenuicaulis).

== Description ==
Aquatic herb.
