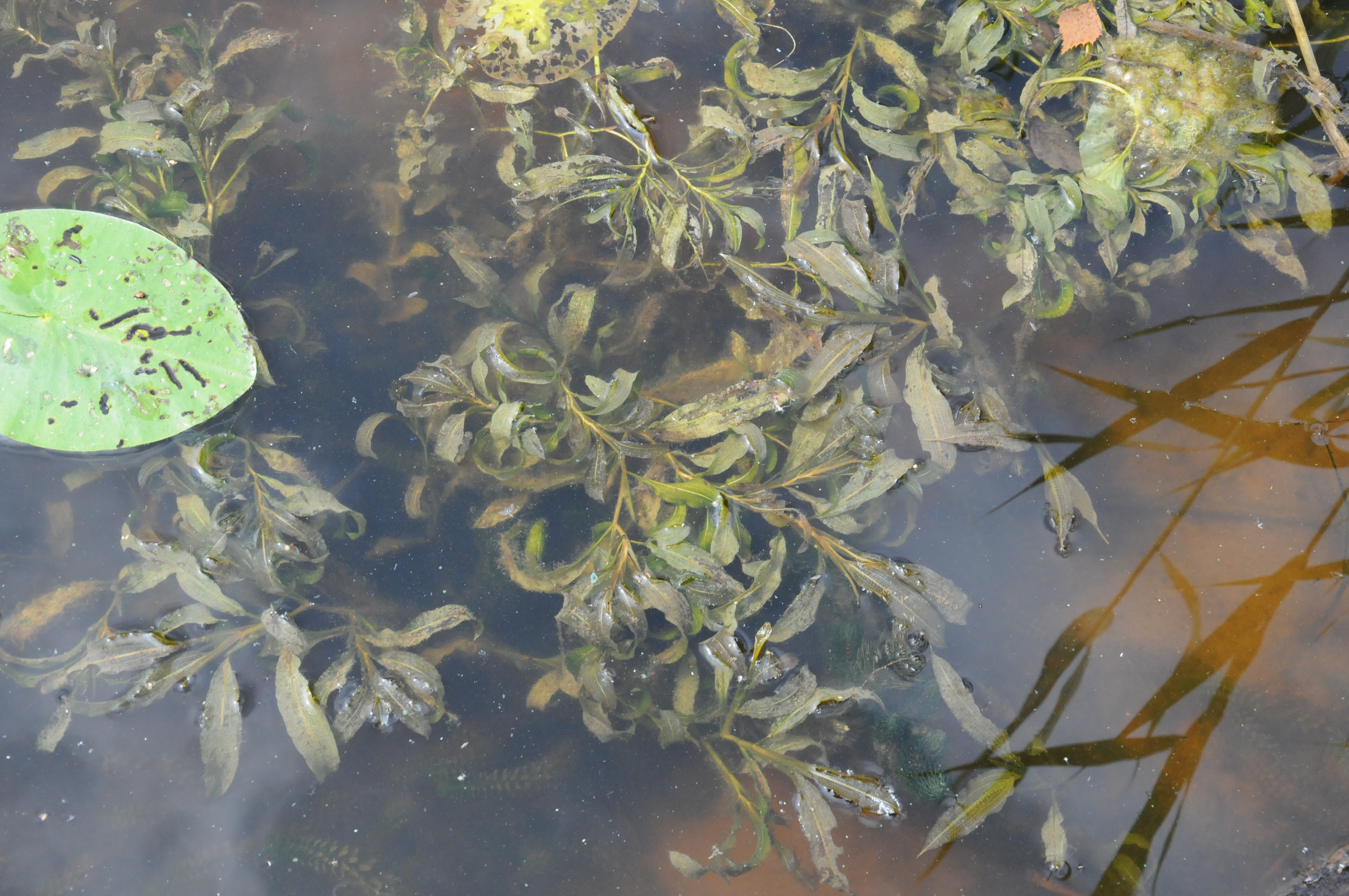

Scientific classification
- Kingdom: Plantae
- Clade: Tracheophytes
- Clade: Angiosperms
- Clade: Monocots
- Order: Alismatales
- Family: Potamogetonaceae
- Genus: Potamogeton
- Species: P. × angustifolius

Binomial name
- Potamogeton × angustifolius J.Presl

Synonyms
- P × babingtonii A.Benn.; P × heidenrichii Asch. & Graebn.; P × zizii W.D.J.Koch ex Roth

= Potamogeton × angustifolius =

Species of flowering plant

Potamogeton × angustifolius is a hybrid pondweed between Potamogeton gramineus and Potamogeton lucens, known as long-leaved pondweed. It is widespread in rivers and lakes except where the water is very soft.

== Description ==
Potamogeton × angustifolius is a hybrid between shining pondweed Potamogeton lucens and various-leaved pondweed Potamogeton gramineus. It is a perennial, growing from robust rhizomes. The stems are variable: slender to robust, terete, and branching, usually reaching 1.2 m but rarely up to 2m. The submerged leaves are reduced to phyllodes at the base of the stem, but elsewhere are broad and translucent, yellowish to dark green, sometimes with a pinkish tinge. The leaves measure 50-130 × 10–25 mm on the stems and main branches, but may be much smaller on the side branches; they have 4-5 (rarely 6) veins either side of the midrib and are usually sessile but some clones may have a few petiolate leaves. Turions are absent.

Unlike P. lucens, Potamogeton × angustifolius sometimes produces floating leaves, which are opaque and typically 55-105 × 22–40 mm.

The stipules are persistent, open, green when fresh, drying to olive or brownish. The inflorescences are 20–50 mm long and have inconspicuous greenish flowers on robust peduncles 45–190 mm long. Fruits are not always produced; if present they are approximately 3 × 2 mm.

Identification of Potamogeton × angustifolius may require experience. It is larger and more robust than P. gramineus but more slender and graceful than P. lucens. There is a tendency for main stems to more closely resemble P. lucens, and side branches P. gramineus. There is however no single character to identify this hybrid, and accurate determination is likely to rely on a combination of characters.

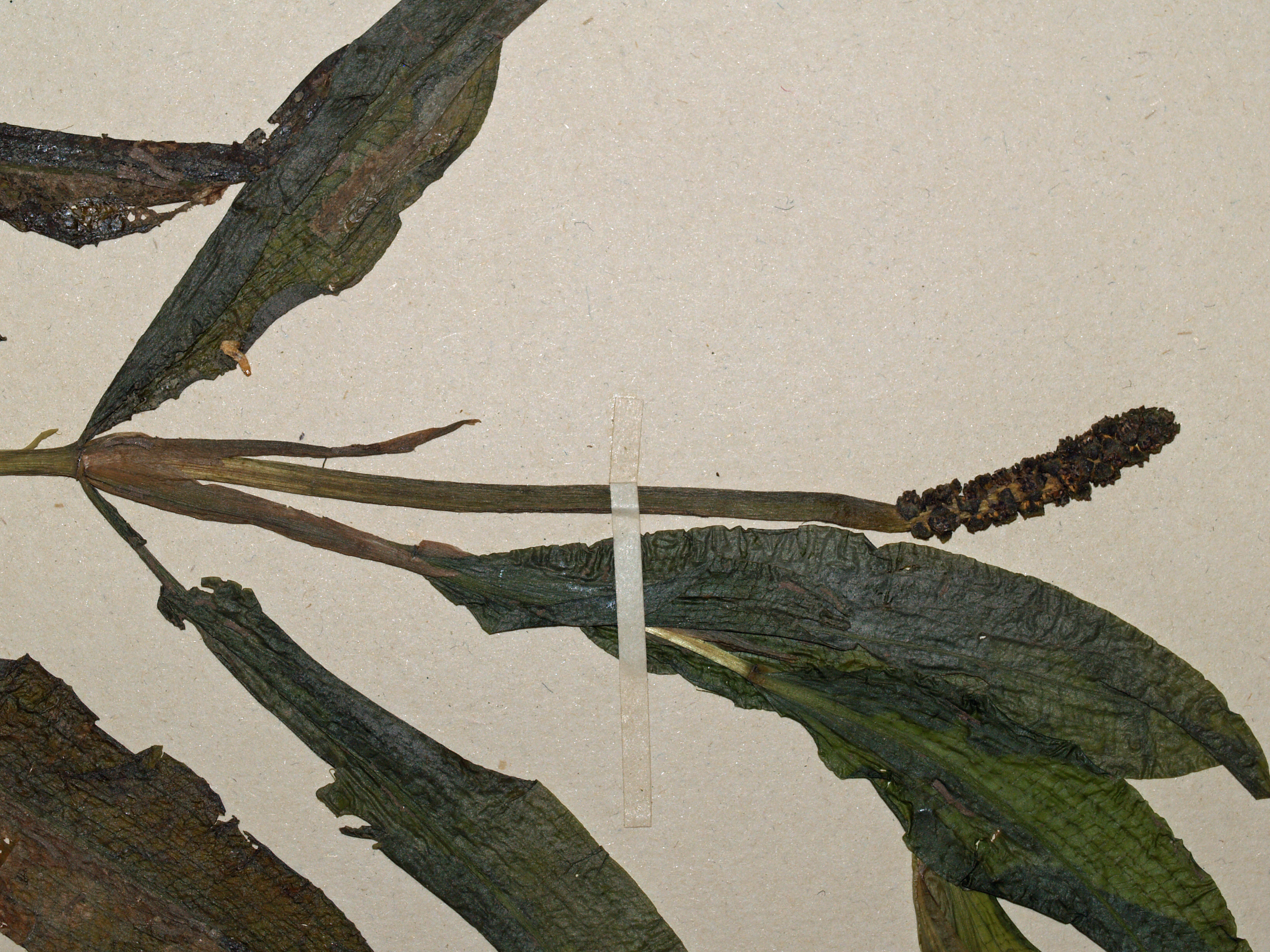
Herbarium specimen of Potamogeton x angustifolius, detail.

== Taxonomy ==
Potamogeton × angustifolius was first described by the Czech botanist Jan Svatopluk Presl in 1821. The species name means 'narrow-leaved'. Until recently the synonym P. x zizii was widely used and is likely to be encountered in the literature.

== Distribution ==
Potamogeton × angustifolius is one of the most frequent pondweed hybrids, and is widespread globally. It has been recorded from Europe to the western Himalayas, including Great Britain, Ireland, the Netherlands, Denmark, Finland, Norway, Sweden, Czech Republic, Germany, Hungary, Poland, Switzerland, France, Portugal, Italy, former Yugoslavia, European Russia, western Siberia, and the western Himalayas.

== Ecological requirements and conservation ==
Potamogeton × angustifolius occurs in the same kind of habitats as its parents: standing or slow-flowing waters with a basic influence, often growing in the absence of one or both parents. There is evidence for a decline in south and east Britain but it remains widespread elsewhere. In Ireland it is widespread in waters that are too base-poor to support P. lucens; in Poland it is one of the most widespread pondweed hybrids.

Potamogeton × angustifolius is classified as Endangered by the German Red List and Vulnerable by the Welsh Vascular Plant Red List.

== Cultivation ==
Potamogeton × angustifolius is not in general cultivation, though like both of its parents it is an attractive plant and easy to grow. It tends to be smaller than P.lucens, which may be an advantage in smaller ponds, but retains the large, netted leaves.

In common with other pondweeds of this group it roots poorly from stem cuttings and is best propagated by division of the rhizomes. Good water quality is needed to reduce the risk of turbid water or growth of blanket weed.
