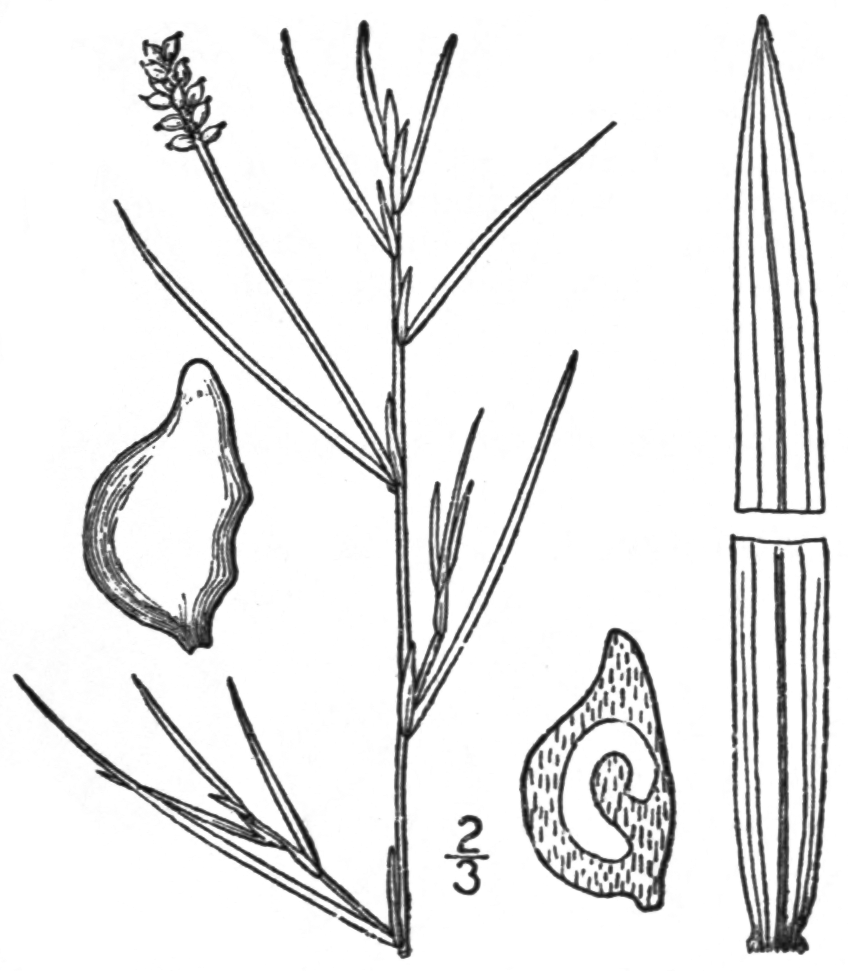
- Sketch of Potamogeton rutilus by Nathaniel Lord Britton & Addison Brown, 1913

Scientific classification
- Kingdom: Plantae
- Clade: Tracheophytes
- Clade: Angiosperms
- Clade: Monocots
- Order: Alismatales
- Family: Potamogetonaceae
- Genus: Potamogeton
- Species: P. rutilus

Binomial name
- Potamogeton rutilus Wolfg.

= Potamogeton rutilus =

Species of flowering plant

Potamogeton rutilus is a species of flowering plant belonging to the family Potamogetonaceae.

Its native range is Europe to Siberia and Mongolia.
