= Waiatarua Reserve =

Nature reserve in Auckland, New Zealand

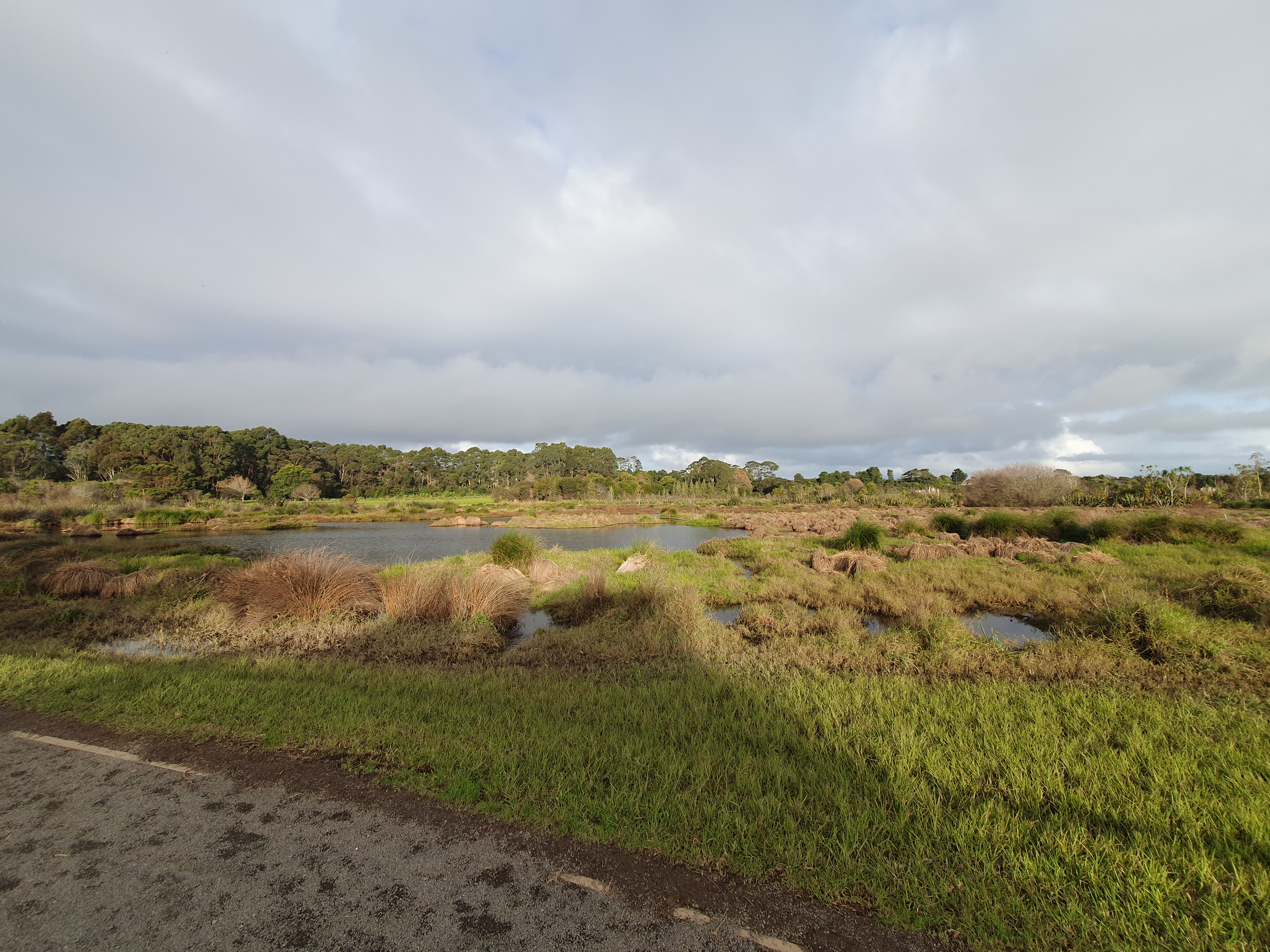
- The Waiatarua Reserve wetlands in 2023
- Interactive map of Waiatarua Reserve
- Type: Public park
- Location: Auckland, New Zealand
- Coordinates: 36.88422°S 174.82556°E
- Area: 20 ha (49 acres)
- Operator: Auckland Council
- Status: Open year round

The Waiatarua Reserve is a nature reserve on the eastern Auckland isthmus in New Zealand, close to the suburbs of Remuera, Meadowbank and St Johns. Originally the site of a freshwater lake, Waiatarua was drained in 1929. Since 1987, the reserve has been redeveloped as an urban wetland, and is currently the largest urban wetland restoration project in New Zealand.

== Geology ==
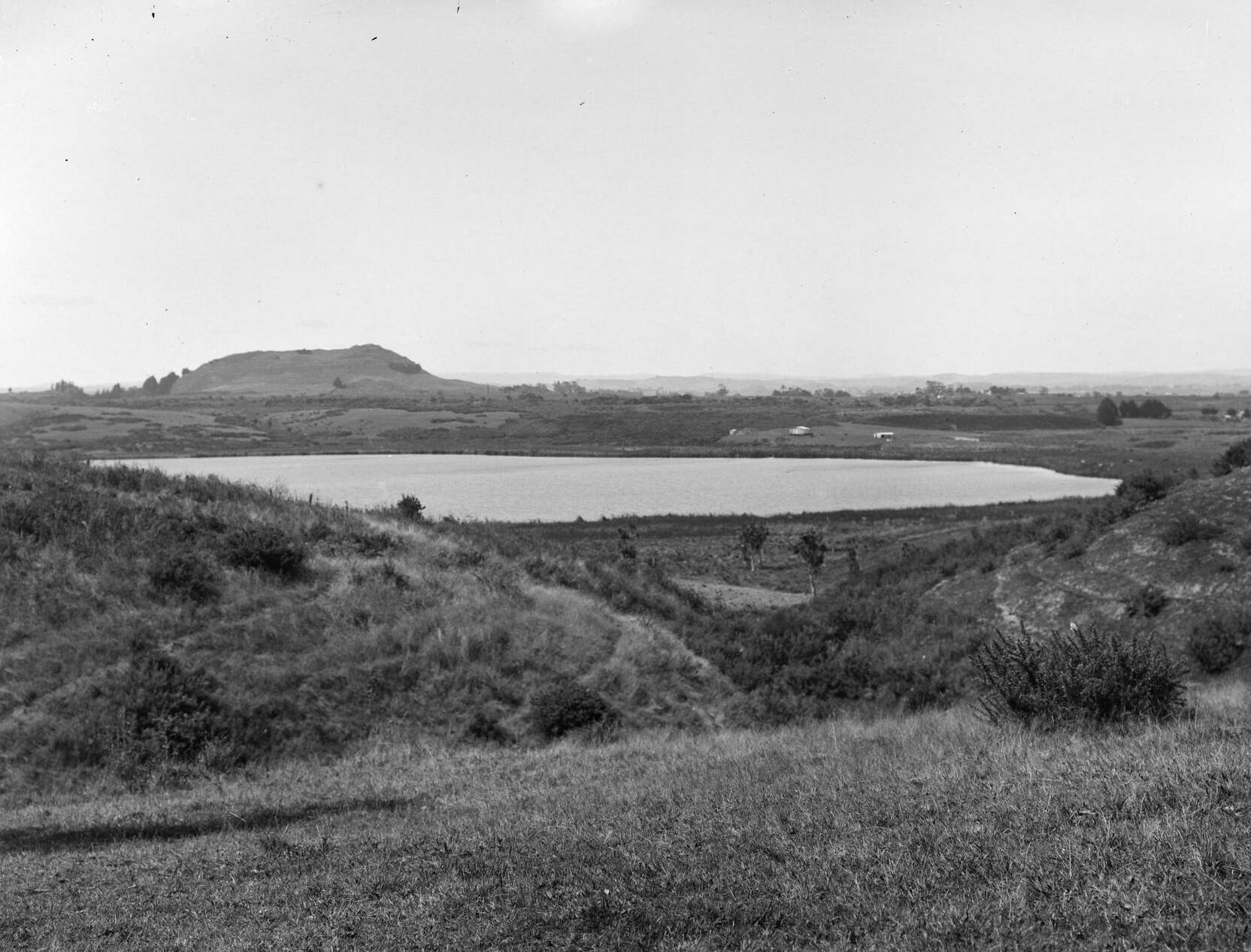
Lake Waiatarua in 1918

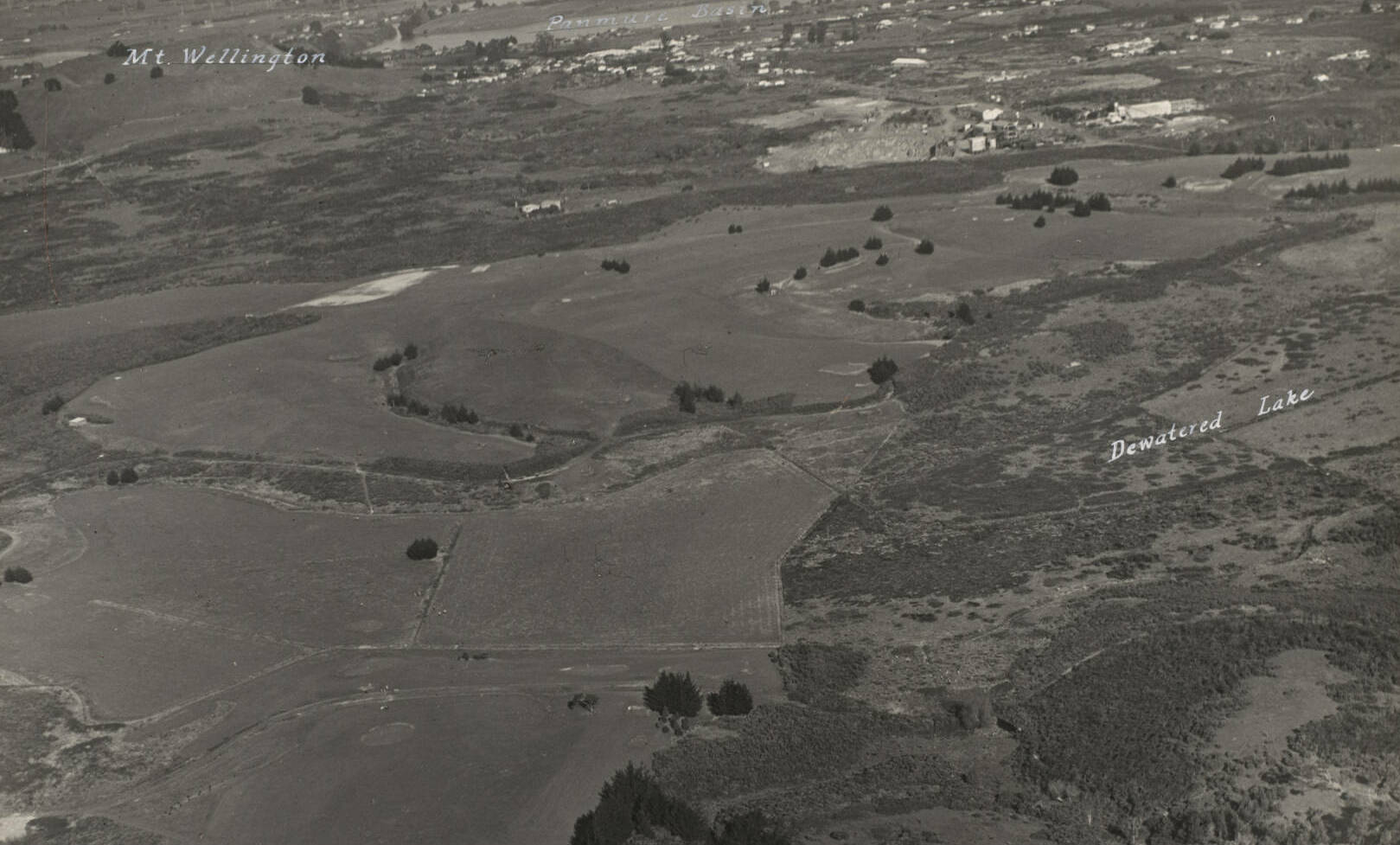
The former lake-site in 1946, showing the Remuera Golf Course

Lake Waiatarua formed after the eruption of Maungarei / Mount Wellington, when a lava flow blocked the flow of a river valley which flowed into the Tāmaki River, approximately 9,000 years ago.

== Biodiversity ==
Since reforestation efforts began, birdlife has returned to the area, including tūī, riroriro and pīwakawaka. Species of native eel can be found at the reserve, as well as native New Zealand red admiral butterflies.

The native red pondweed, Potamogeton cheesemanii, was described from specimens gathered by Thomas Cheeseman in the former lake.

== History ==
The traditional Tāmaki Māori name for the lake, Waiatarua, means the "Waters of Reflection". The lake was an important freshwater resource for Ngāti Whātua Ōrākei, prior to European settlement. During the early colonial period of New Zealand, it was named Lake St John.

The land adjoining the lake was acquired by Bishop Selwyn in 1851, as a part of the grounds of the St John's College. In the 1870s, it was proposed as a source for drinking water for the city of Auckland, however this plan did not eventuate.

In 1908 the Waiatarua Drainage Board was formed, intending to drain the swamplands around the lake, despite wide public opposition to the plan. A tunnel was constructed underneath Remuera Road, in order to drain the lake into the Ōrākei Basin, which was completed by 1929. The tunnel led to the lake disappearing, and filled the Ōrākei Basin with considerable amounts of silt. In 1934, the Remuera Golf Club was established on leased land to the east of the site of the drained lake.

In 1987, the reserve was developed into an artificial wetland. It is currently the largest wetland restoration project in New Zealand, and in 2006 Auckland City won the Arthur Mead Environmental Award due to the restoration efforts.
