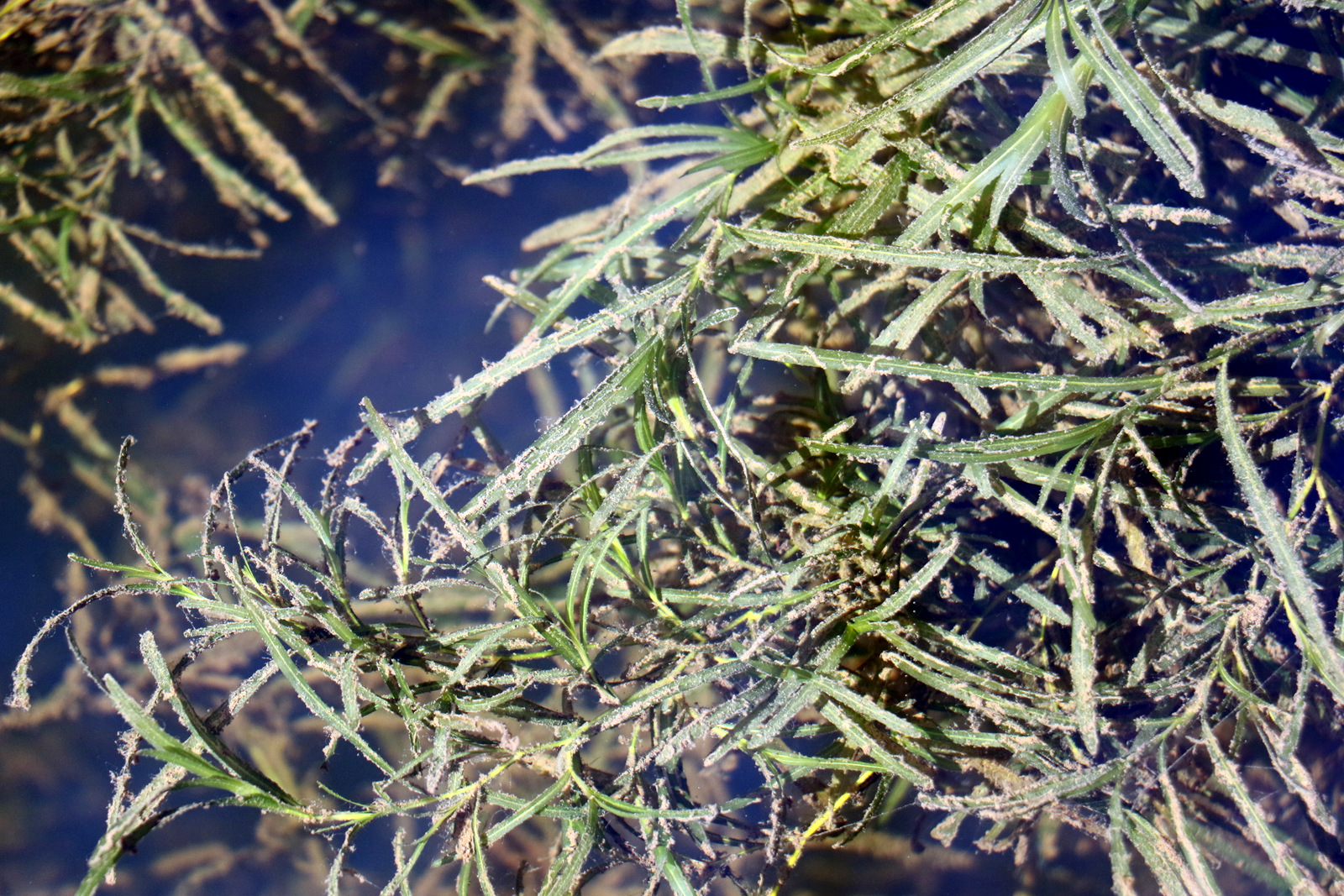
- Frenchs Creek, Garigal National Park, Australia

Scientific classification
- Kingdom: Plantae
- Clade: Tracheophytes
- Clade: Angiosperms
- Clade: Monocots
- Order: Alismatales
- Family: Potamogetonaceae
- Genus: Potamogeton
- Species: P. ochreatus

Binomial name
- Potamogeton ochreatus Raoul

Synonyms
- Potamogeton furcatus Hagstr.

= Potamogeton ochreatus =

Blunt pondweed

Species of plant

Potamogeton ochreatus, common name blunt pondweed, is a species of freshwater plant found in fast moving or still water in Australia and New Zealand. Stems are round in cross section, up to four metres long. The specific epithet ochreatus is derived from Latin, meaning "greave" a piece of leg armour, alluding to the shape of the sheath at the leaf base.
