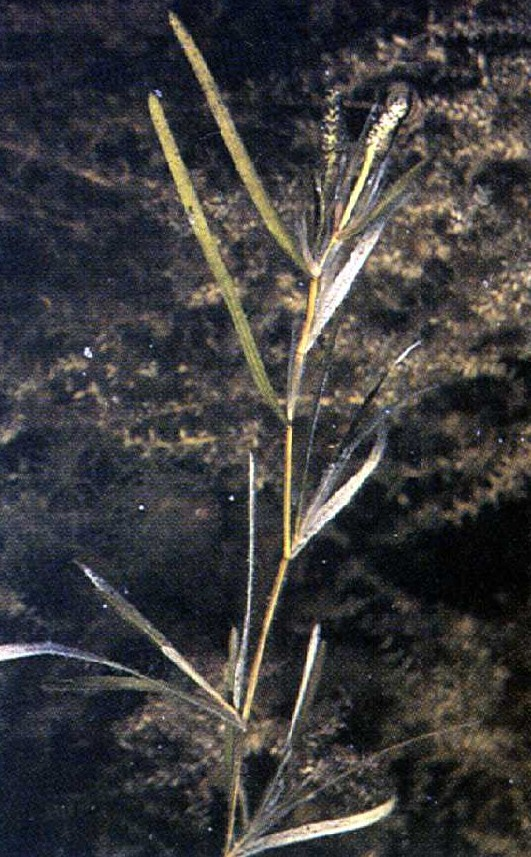

Scientific classification
- Kingdom: Plantae
- Clade: Tracheophytes
- Clade: Angiosperms
- Clade: Monocots
- Order: Alismatales
- Family: Potamogetonaceae
- Genus: Potamogeton
- Species: P. compressus

Binomial name
- Potamogeton compressus L.

Synonyms
- Potamogeton acutifolius Hornem.; Potamogeton complanatus Willd.; Potamogeton cuspidatus Schrad.; Potamogeton monoginus Miki; Potamogeton reflexus A.Benn.; Potamogeton zosterifolius Schumach.; Potamogeton zosteriformis Fernald; Potamogeton zosterophyllus Dumort.; Spirillus zosterifolius (Schumach.) Nieuwl.

= Potamogeton compressus =

Species of aquatic plant

Potamogeton compressus is a species of aquatic plant known by the common names grass-wrack pondweed, flatstem pondweed and eel-grass pondweed.

== Description ==
Potamogeton compressus produces a strongly flattened, robust, branching stem up to 90 cm in maximum length. It grows annually from turions and seed, producing bushy plants branching near the surface with long, rather grass-like leaves that are 85–240 mm long and 3–6 mm wide and olive-green or dark green, sometimes with a reddish tinge near the surface. Each leaf has two veins either side of the midrib and is bluntly pointed. The leaves have a rather opaque appearance compared to the transparent leaves of most pondweeds due to the presence of fibres called sclerenchymatous strands. There are no rhizomes or floating leaves.

The inflorescences are up to 6 mm long with 4–6 flowers with a short peduncle (5–20 mm long, occasionally more). The fruits are 3.1–4 x 2.1–3 mm.

Grass-wrack pondweed is relatively easily distinguished from most other pondweeds by its combination of strongly flattened stems and sclerenchymatous strands in the leaf . P. acutifolius is similar in Europe but can be distinguished by its sharply pointed leaves, less branched habit and flower spikes with only 2–6 flowers on peduncles up to 20 mm long. In the Far East, P. mandschuriensis is an altogether smaller plant, with leaves 1.5–2.3 mm wide and 8–14 sclerenchymatous strands, stem 0.8–1.5 mm wide, and fruit 2.8–3.8 mm diameter.

This is a diploid species, with 2n=28.

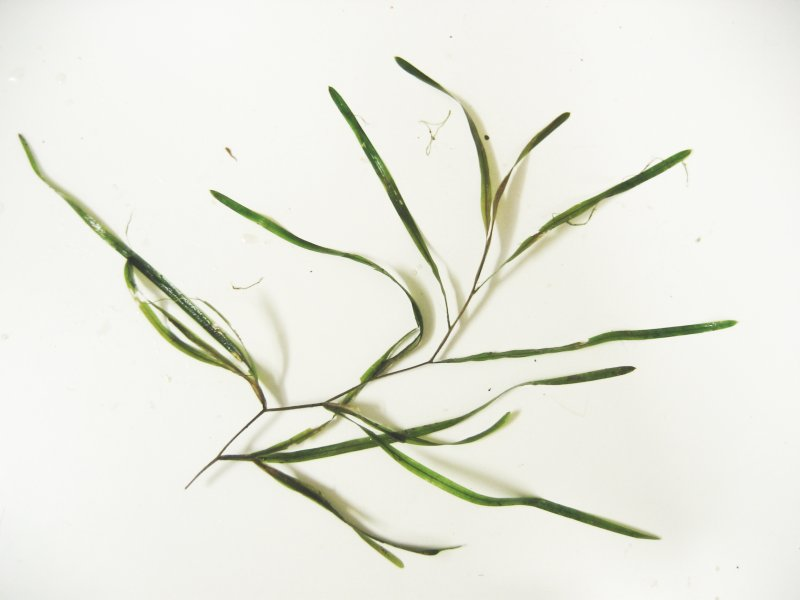
General habit

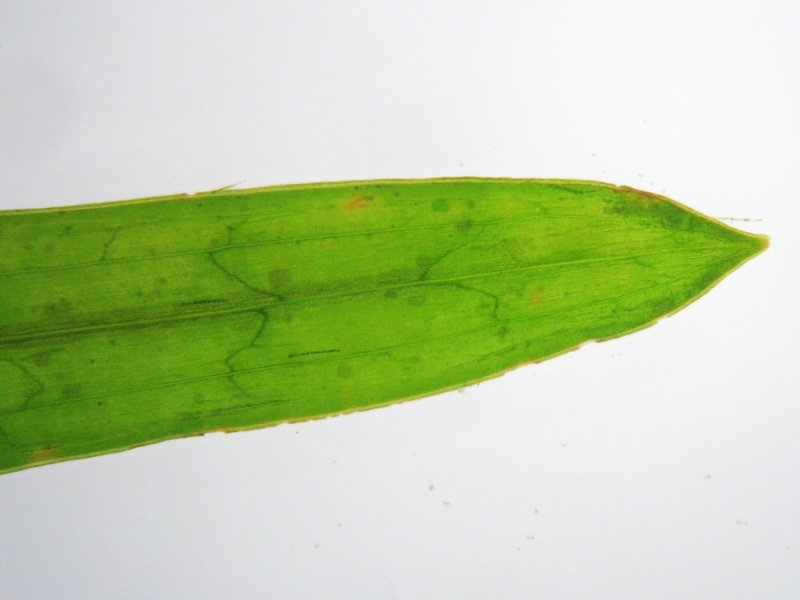
Leaf tip

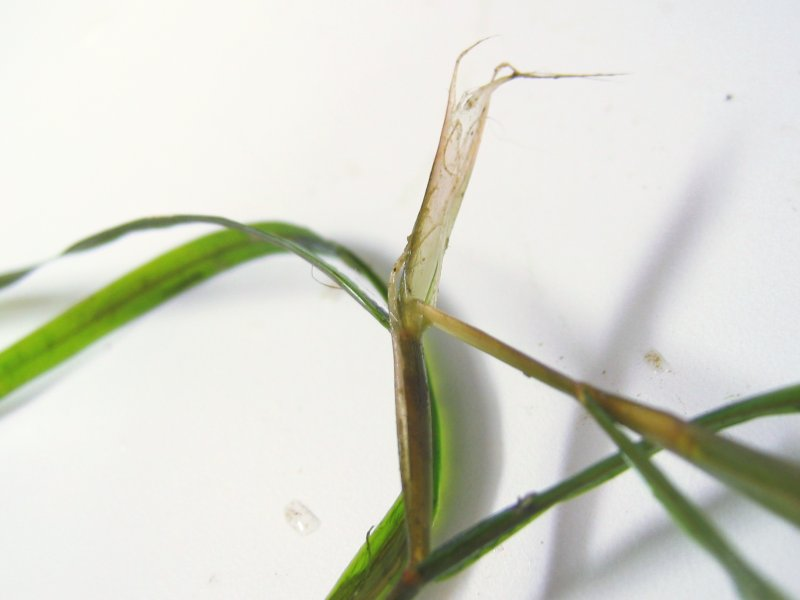
Detail of stipule and compressed stem

Hybrids with P. acutifolius (P. × bambergensis Fischer), P. oxyphyllus (P. × faurei Miki) and P. trichoides (P. × ripoides Baagøe) have been recorded. P. × bambergensis may be reasonably frequent where the two species coexist, but like many fine-leaved pondweed hybrids, is difficult to identify reliably without using genetic techniques.

== Taxonomy ==
Potamogeton compressus was first named by Linnaeus in Species Plantarum (1753). For much of the 19th century, Potamogeton friesii was incorrectly known as P. compressus, which has led to considerable confusion.

Grass-wrack pondweed is one of a group of rather closely related species that also includes P. acutifolius and P. mandschuriensis. North American populations have been assigned to Potamogeton zosteriformis Fernald. Although this is not a currently accepted name, there is molecular evidence to suggest it is probably distinct from P. compressus.

== Distribution ==
Potamogeton compressus is native to Europe (Austria, Britain, Denmark, Finland, France, Germany, Ireland, Netherlands, Poland, Russia, Spain, Sweden, Switzerland, Ukraine), Asia (China (Yunnan), Japan, Kazakhstan, Mongolia, Russia).

In North America P. compressus / zosteriformis occurs in northern USA and Canada. There are isolated populations in the Balkans, Oregon and the Rockies. There is considerable uncertainty regarding the exact distribution of this species in Siberia and Canada.

== Ecology and Conservation ==
Grass-wrack pondweed grows in still or slow-flowing, lowland, calcareous and often rather nutrient-rich water bodies such as backwaters in rivers, ponds and slow-moving streams, usually on fine substrates such as sand, silt, clay or peat, usually in less than 1.5 m water depth. However, Japanese populations have been reported growing in 5 m of water. It is also capable of colonising artificial habitats such as canals and drainage ditches, so long as these are not heavily boated. Grass-wrack pondweed is intolerant of turbid water and prefers some shade. Like its close relative Potamogeton acutifolius, it rarely grows in lakes; the shallow root system is intolerant of disturbance and is therefore vulnerable to wind action, boat disturbance and uprooting by fish.

Potamogeton compressus is a rather early succession species and tends to be outcompeted unless the habitat it grows in is regularly disturbed. As a result, populations are often transient. Most reproduction in the wild appears to be asexual via turions, which is likely to mean that populations have limited ability to recolonise if lost. However, turion production is not prolific, with wild plants typically producing only 4-5 turions. Flowering and fruiting seems to be more frequent in shallow water environments with fluctuating water levels, such as ditches.

Grass-wrack pondweed is threatened in many parts of its range especially in Europe: it is Extinct in the Czech Republic, Critically Endangered in Flanders, Endangered in Germany, England, Vulnerable in the Carpathian region, Wales, and Near Threatened in the Netherlands. In North America it is listed as Endangered in Maryland and New Jersey, Threatened in New Hampshire and Rare in Pennsylvania. In Britain P. compressus is a Biodiversity Action Plan priority species and is subject to conservation action including translocation efforts.

These declines probably reflect the widespread damage to riverine landscapes across lowland Europe, and in particular the loss of many features such as back channels, oxbow lakes and floodplain ponds as rivers are channelised and engineered for flood defence and agricultural purposes. The largest British populations are in disused or rarely boated canals, which cannot be the primary habitat for grass-wrack pondweed and are not a sustainable long-term habitat. However, in the short-term, canal populations are an important reservoir for this species. Competition with introduced Elodea canadensis (Canadian pondweed) and E. nuttallii (Nuttall's water-thyme) may also be problematic. It is possible that the widespread reintroduction of beaver across Europe may help to arrest or reverse the decline of grass-wrack pondweed, as beaver ponds may well be a suitable habitat for this species.

== Cultivation ==
Potamogeton compressus is not in cultivation. It could probably be cultivated in rather silty ponds, so long as they are regularly cleaned out in order to prevent other more competitive plants from excluding it. Cultivation experiments for conservation purposes have successfully grown plants to maturity from turions planted in late winter, but adult plants are more difficult to establish due to their limited root system and fragile nature. High mortality was also observed due to snail predation in culture.
