= Potamogeton illinoensis =

Scientific classification
- Kingdom: Plantae
- Clade: Tracheophytes
- Clade: Angiosperms
- Clade: Monocots
- Order: Alismatales
- Family: Potamogetonaceae
- Genus: Potamogeton
- Species: P. illinoensis

Binomial name
- Potamogeton illinoensis Morong

Species of aquatic plant

Potamogeton illinoensis, commonly known as Illinois pondweed or shining pondweed, is an aquatic plant. It provides food and cover for aquatic animals.

It is generally not weedy in its native range, but it is a troublesome noxious weed in Viedma, Río Negro, Argentina, where it is an introduced species.

Recently, it has managed to invade the Montezuma Well.
