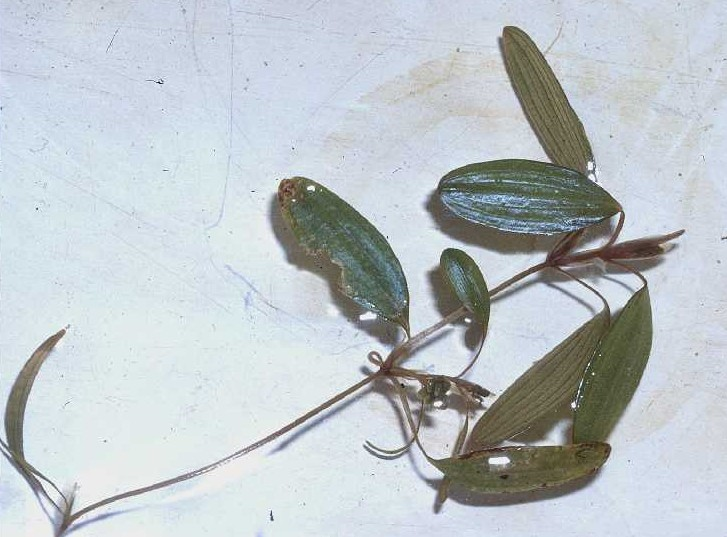
- Potamogeton diversifolius

Scientific classification
- Kingdom: Plantae
- Clade: Tracheophytes
- Clade: Angiosperms
- Clade: Monocots
- Order: Alismatales
- Family: Potamogetonaceae
- Genus: Potamogeton
- Species: P. diversifolius

Binomial name
- Potamogeton diversifolius Raf.

= Potamogeton diversifolius =

Waterthread pondweed

Species of aquatic plant

Potamogeton diversifolius is a species of aquatic plant known by the common names waterthread pondweed and diverse-leaved pondweed. It is native to most of the United States, as well as sections of southwestern Canada, and northern Mexico, where it grows in water bodies such as ponds, lakes, ditches, and slow-moving streams. This is a perennial herb producing a very narrow, compressed stem branching to a maximum length around 35 centimeters. It has thin, pointed linear leaves a few centimeters long spirally arranged about the thin stem. The inflorescence is a small spike of flowers emerging from the water surface. Inflorescences also grow on submersed sections of the stem; these are smaller and spherical. It can be difficult to distinguish from similar species of pondweed.

== Description ==
Potamogeton diversifolius is a vascular aquatic plant that is sometimes known as waterthread pondweed or diverse-leaved pondweed. Some synonyms are Potamogeton capillaceus var. atripes, Potamogeton capillaceus and Potamogeton diversifolius var. multidenticulatus. The plant has dimorphic leaves and is thread like. The leaves are both floating and submerged in water. The floating leaves tend to usually have 7-11 distinct veins, are elliptic and oval in outline. They submerged leaves are alternating, smaller and only usually have 3 veins. Submersed leaves have stipules at the base of the leaf petiole that forms a sheath around the stem. The plant is pale green is in total 0.78-2.5 inches long and 0.02-0.06 inches wide. The plant is a perennial with multi-branched stems extending between 40 and 80 cm long. Stipules of the submersed leaves are fused at the base of the leaf blade and 4–10 mm long The fruits are almost disk-shaped and tend to curve inward towards each other. They also usually have lateral keels and are 0.9 to 2.0 mm in diameter. Flowers range between 1-15 with spikes that are dimorphic. Seeds are formed in clusters. The clusters range from 1-15 and on the stalks of submersed leaves. The floating leaves have lindrical spikes that contain seeds ranging from 5-120 in the axils. The plant blooms red with flowers and fruits throughout June to December. The waterthread pondweed has a stem that is horizontal, threadlike and cylindrical with the root branching off of that. Rooting occurs at the nodes of the plants. The elliptical floating and submersed leaves and the distinctive veins help to distinguish the plant from other types of pondweeds.

== Taxonomy ==
The order of the plant is Alismatales, the family is Potamogetonaceae and the genus is Potamogen. The taxonomy of this plant has been debated for years and yet still is a confusing situation. It has been separated into two different species P. diversifolius in the strict sense and P. capillaceus (M, L. Fernald 1932). Since then the species has also been divided into varieties, var. diversifolius and var. trichophyllus (D. S. Correl l and M. C. Johnston 1970). The variety of trichophyllus has been found to be misapplied. We are now following E. J. Klekowski Jr. and E.O. Beal (1965) in only accepting one taxon. Potamogeton diversifolious was found to be a subsection of the genus known as Hybridi.

== Uses ==
Potamogeton diversifolius is known to be used as food for at least approximately 124 animals. The plant provides a habitat for many micro- and macroinvertebrates. After the plant dies decomposition by bacteria and fungi provides food invertebrates. The seeds are eaten by waterfowl. Leaves are eaten by fish and invertebrates. Potamogeton diversifolius is known to be a host of aquatic fungi. In a study on the food of game ducks it was recorded that 11.04% of their food was Potamogeton diversifolius within 247 locations in the United States and Canada. The proportion of P. diversifolius in the diet of game ducks along the Atlantic coast was 11.73%, 13.29% in eastern region, 6.06% in Mississippi region, 3.99% at the gulf coast, 16.29% in western region, 12.14% in Pacific coast, 12.73% in western Canada and 12.47% in eastern Canada.

== Distribution ==
Potamogeton diversifolius can be found in shallow bodies of water including streams, ponds and shallow sections of the lakes. This species is one of the most numerous and widely distributed pondweeds throughout the North America and can be found in 43 US States. This pondweed is in different types of still waters such as pools, ponds, lakes, and even some streams. The plant is currently listed as invasive in Cuba. Water thread pondweed can be found in fresh water. In an experiment involving fish predation scientists discovered that Potamogeton diversifolius was only found within fish free enclosures. P. diversifolius occurs scattered throughout the United States except for the New England states. In recent years the species has been found in newly excavated ditches that contain clay like soil. The species has been found at elevations as high as 2744 m Potamogeton diversifolius has been found in both full sunlight and partial shade. Potamogeton diversifolius occurs in northern Mexico and in Cuba.

== Management ==
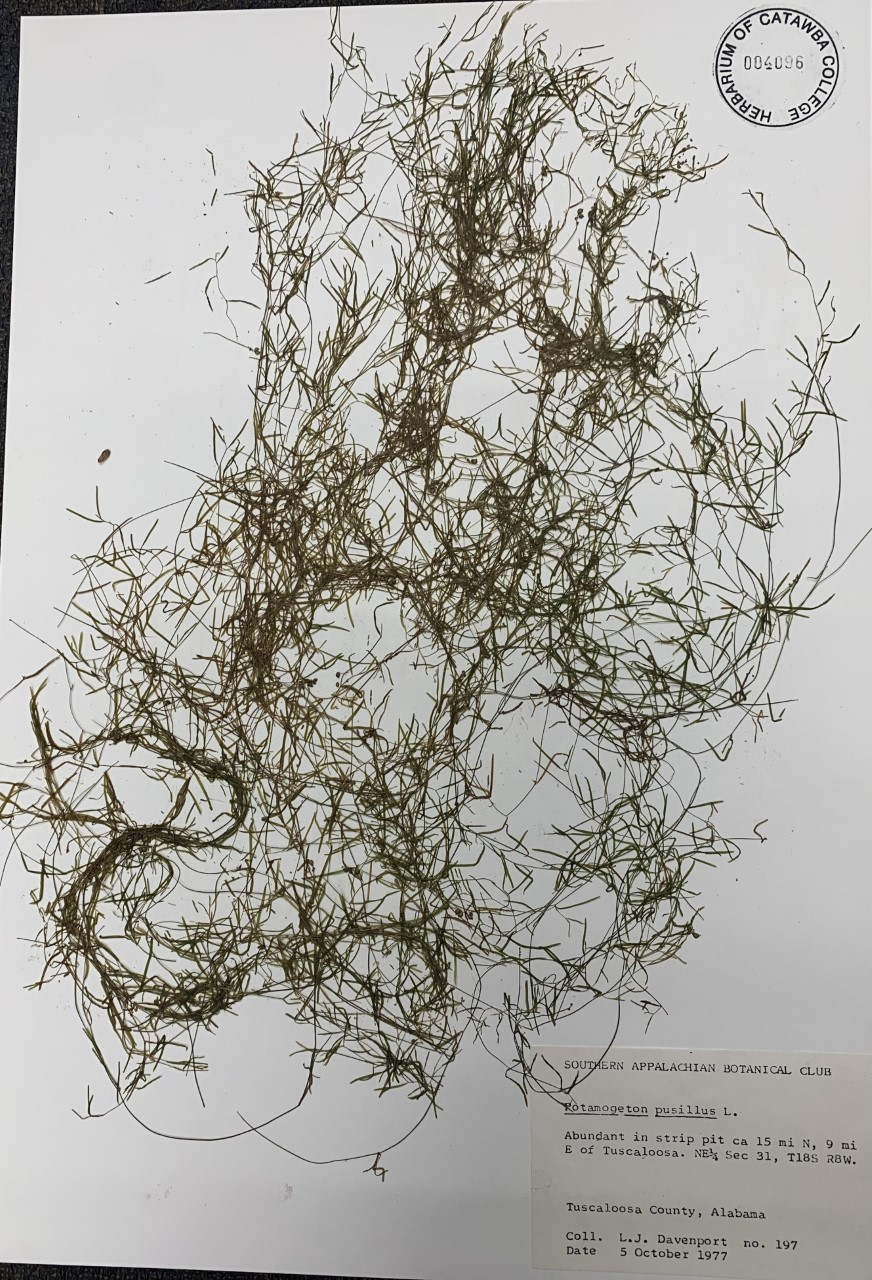
Herbarium Sheet of Potamogeton pusillus L.

This species is sensitive to water quality. Potamogeton diversifolius requires both high water levels and sunlight. There currently are no threats to this plant, the global conservation status rank of this species is G5. Dicchlobenil is one of the herbicides that has been proven to be effective in controlling pondweeds. Water thread pond weed can be removed easily by scooping, raking or gathering it from the pond, but will regrow roots, fragments, and seeds. One way to reduce P. diversifolius growth in water is the application of non-toxic dyes to help reduce the amount of sunlight penetration in water. Water thread pondweed can be propagated by either seeds or transplanting of the roots during early spring into shallow, clear water.
