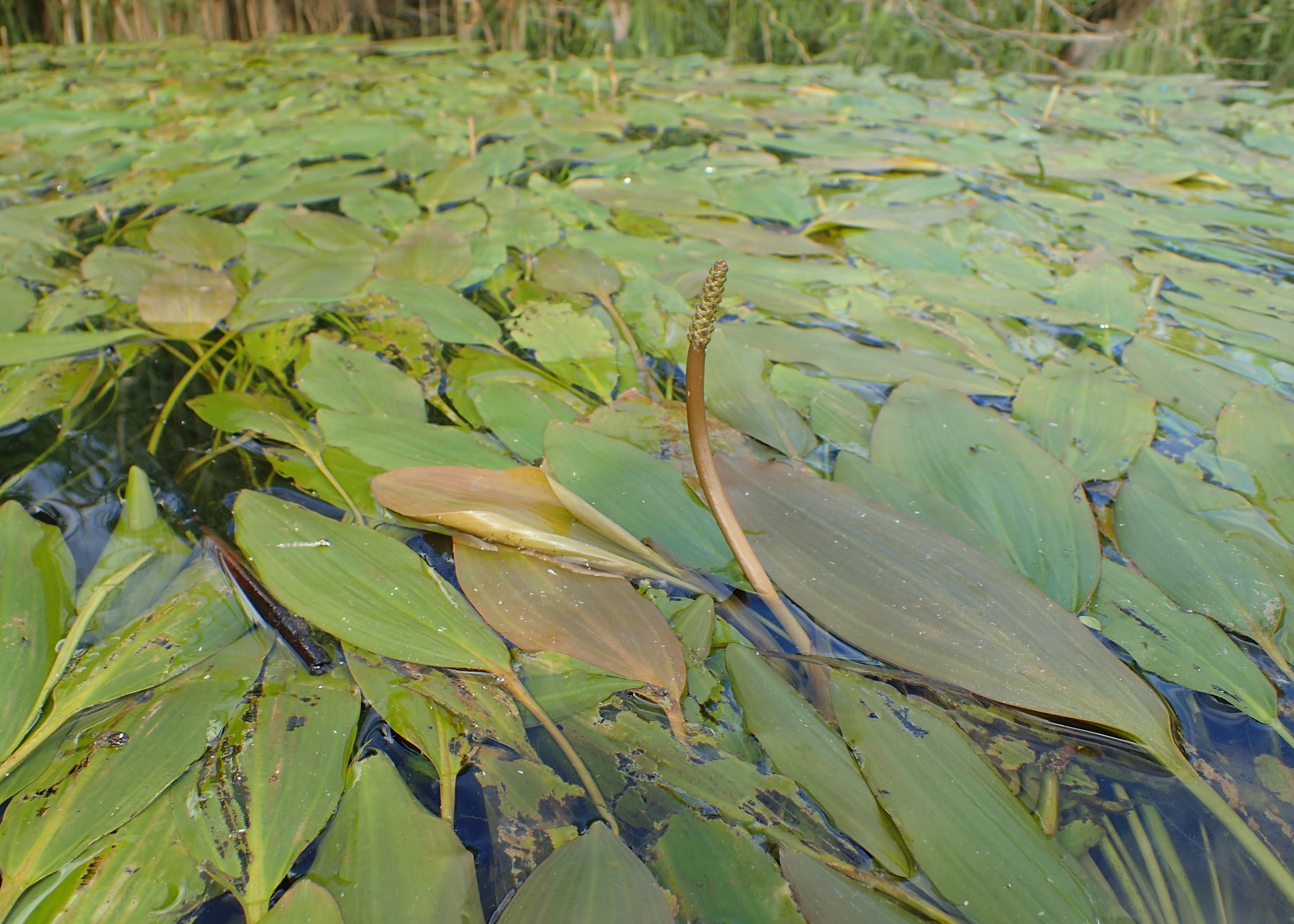

Conservation status
- Least Concern (IUCN 3.1)

Scientific classification
- Kingdom: Plantae
- Clade: Tracheophytes
- Clade: Angiosperms
- Clade: Monocots
- Order: Alismatales
- Family: Potamogetonaceae
- Genus: Potamogeton
- Species: P. nodosus

Binomial name
- Potamogeton nodosus Poir.

Synonyms
- Potamogeton americanus Potamogeton fluitans

= Potamogeton nodosus =

Longleaf pondweed

Species of aquatic plant

Potamogeton nodosus is a species of aquatic plant known by the common names longleaf pondweed and Loddon pondweed. It is native to Eurasia and the Americas, where it is widespread and can be found in water bodies such as ponds, lakes, ditches, and streams. This is a perennial herb producing a thin, branching stem easily exceeding a meter in maximum length. The submerged leaves are linear to widely lance-shaped and up to 15 by 4 centimetres (5.9 in × 1.6 in) in length and width, respectively, while the floating leaves achieve shorter maximum lengths and are ovate or elliptic. Both floating leaves and submerged leaves are borne on long petioles, a distinguishing characteristic. The inflorescence is a spike of many small flowers arising from the water on a peduncle.
