= Eastern Asia (WGSRPD) =

Eastern Asia, as defined in the WGSRPD

Eastern Asia is one of the regions of temperate Asia defined in the World Geographical Scheme for Recording Plant Distributions (WGSRPD) for use in recording the distribution of plants. It is very much smaller than common definitions of East Asia. It consists of the Korean Peninsula, Japan (Hokkaido, Honshu, Kyushu and Shikoku, plus associated offshore islands – the Volcano Islands (Kazan-retto), the Ryukyu Islands (Nansei-shoto) and the Bonin Islands (Ogasawara-shoto)), and Taiwan. Some islands belonging to Japan politically, such as Marcus Island (Minami-Tori-shima), have greater floristic affinity with similar Pacific islands and are placed in the botanical continent of the Pacific.

== WGSRPD system ==
The WGSRPD is a biogeographical system developed by the international Biodiversity Information Standards (TDWG) organization. The system provides clear definitions and codes for recording plant distributions at four scales or levels, from "botanical continents" down to parts of large countries. The top two levels are given numerical codes. The botanical continent 3 Asia-Temperate has nine regions, one of which is 38 Eastern Asia.

Organizations and works using the scheme include the International Union for Conservation of Nature (IUCN), the Germplasm Resources Information Network (GRIN), and the World Checklist of Selected Plant Families (WCSP). For example, the entry for Lilium concolor in the WCSP includes the numerical codes "30 31 36 37 38", the initial "3" showing these are all regions of Asia-Temperate, with "38" being Eastern Asia.

== Eastern Asia subdivisions ==
The Eastern Asia region is subdivided into areas and "basic recording units", which are given letter codes:

Divisions of 38 Eastern Asia
Level 3 area	Level 4 unit
JAP Japan	JAP-HK Hokkaido
JAP Japan	JAP-HN Honshu
JAP Japan	JAP-KY Kyushu
JAP Japan	JAP-SH Shikoku
KZN Kazan-retto	KZN-OO Kazan-retto (Volcano Islands)
NNS Nansei-shoto	NNS-OO Nansei-shoto (Ryukyu Islands)
OGA Ogasawara-shoto	OGA-OO Ogasawara-shoto (Bonin Islands)
KOR Korea	KOR-NK North Korea
KOR Korea	KOR-SK South Korea
TAI Taiwan	TAI-OO Taiwan

== Changes ==
Some small changes were made to the Eastern Asia region between the first and second editions of the WGSRPD. The Volcano Islands (Kazan-retto) and the Bonin Islands (Ogasawara-shoto) were moved from the Pacific botanical continent to Eastern Asia within Asia-Temperate as they have many endemic plants in common with Eastern Asia.

== See also ==
- Category:Flora of Eastern Asia
