= Tarn Hows =

Lake in Cumbria, England

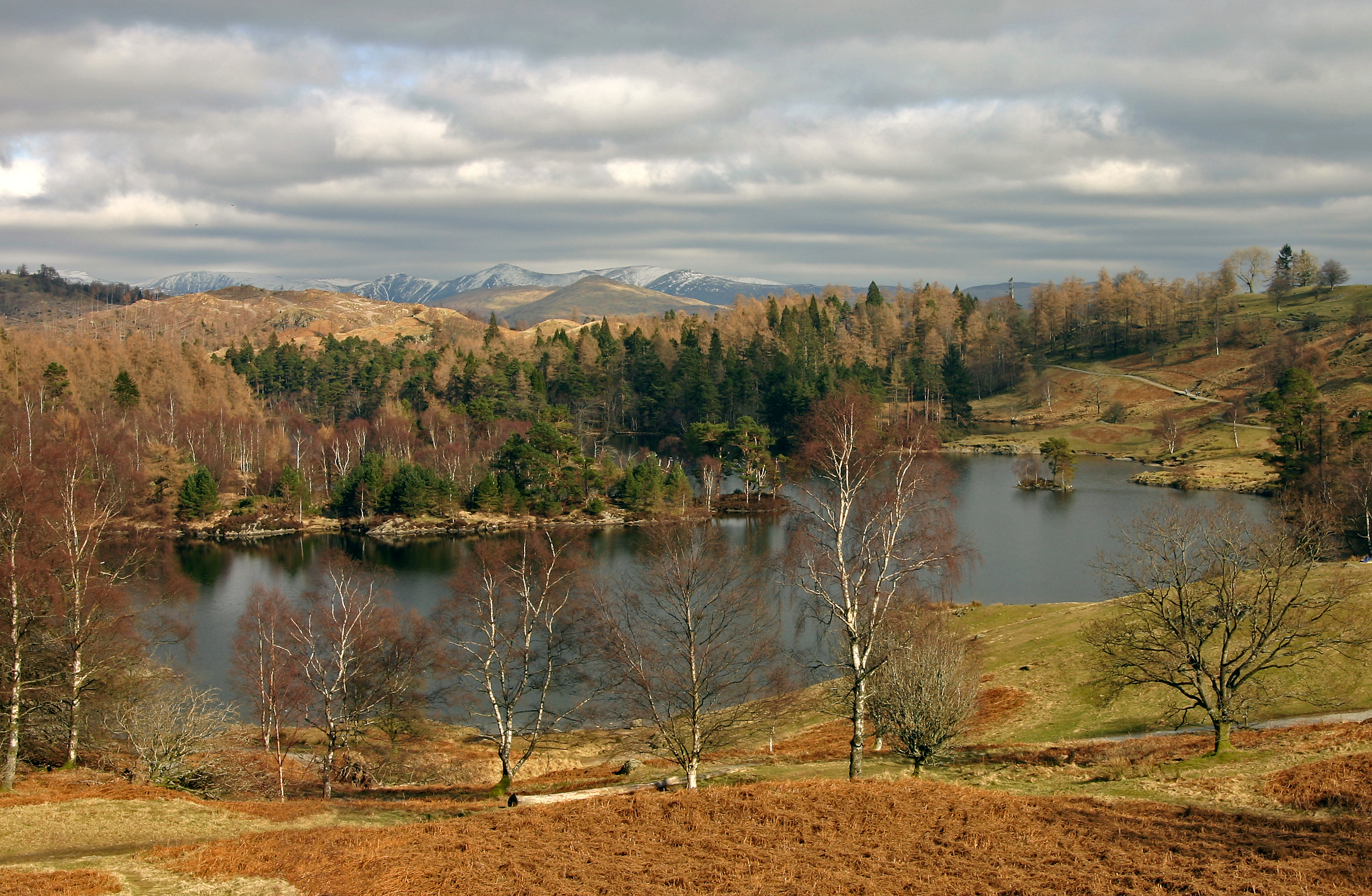
- Tarn Hows in winter 2006

- Location in the Lake District National Park Location in South Lakeland, Cumbria
- Location: Lake District
- Coordinates: 54°23′N 3°02′W
- Type: artificial
- Primary outflows: Tom Gill
- Catchment area: 1.11 km^{2} (0.43 sq mi)
- Basin countries: United Kingdom
- Max. length: 0.971 km (0.603 mi)
- Max. width: 0.258 km (0.160 mi)
- Surface area: 15 ha (37 acres)
- Average depth: 5.4 m (18 ft)
- Max. depth: 8.8 m (29 ft)
- Water volume: 0.000754 km^{3} (611 acre⋅ft)
- Shore length^{1}: 3.1 km (1.9 mi)
- Surface elevation: 180–188 m (591–617 ft)
- Islands: 5
- ^{1} Shore length is not a well-defined measure.

Tarn Hows is an area of the Lake District National Park in North West England, It contains a picturesque tarn, approximately 2 miles (3.2 km) northeast of Coniston and about 1.5 miles (2.4 km) northwest of Hawkshead. It is one of the most popular tourist destinations in the area with over half a million visitors per year in the 1970s and is managed by the National Trust.

Tarn Hows is fed at its northern end by a series of valley and basin mires and is drained by Tom Gill which cascades down over several small waterfalls to Glen Mary bridge: named by John Ruskin who felt that Tom Gill required a more picturesque name and so gave the area the title 'Glen Mary'.

The area features in the map of the open world racing game Forza Horizon 4.

== History ==
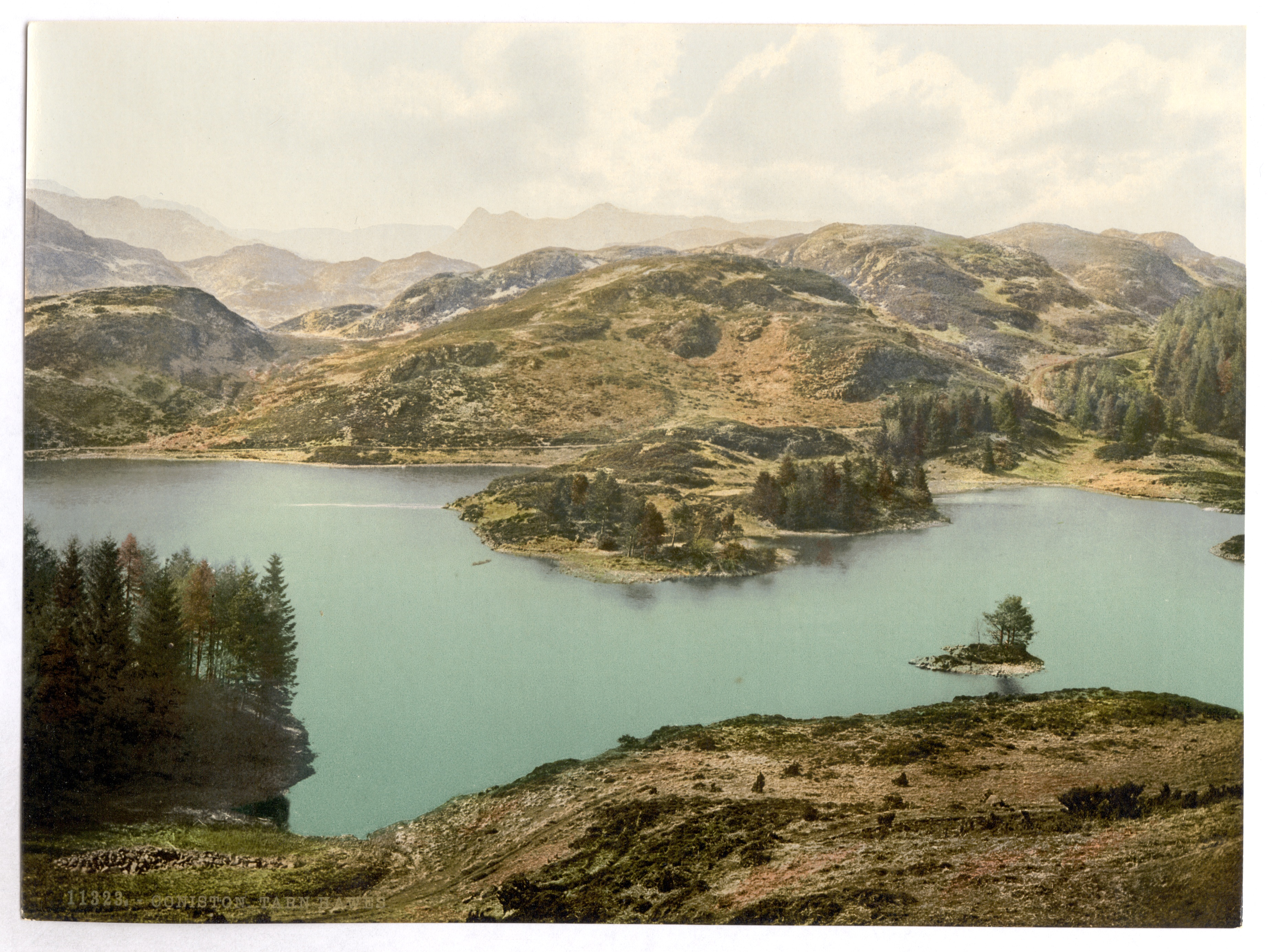
A photochrom print of Tarn Hows dating from 1890 to 1900.

The Tarn Hows area originally contained three much smaller tarns, Low Tarn, Middle Tarn and High Tarn.

Wordsworth's Guide Through the District of the Lakes (1835 edition) recommends walkers to come this way but passes the tarns without mention.

Until 1862 much of the Tarn Hows area was part of the open common grazing of Hawkshead parish. The remaining enclosed land and many of the local farms and quarries were owned by the Marshall family of Monk Coniston Hall (known as Waterhead House at the time). James Garth Marshall (1802–1873) who was the Member of Parliament for Leeds (1847–1852) and third son of the industrialist John Marshall, gained full possession of all of the land after an inclosure act of 1862 and embarked on a series of landscape improvements in the area including expanding the spruce, larch and pine plantations around the tarns; demolition of the Water Head Inn at Coniston; and the construction of a dam at Low Tarn that created the larger tarn that is there today.

By 1899 Tarn Hows was already an important beauty spot. H.S. Cowper mentions "Tarn Hows, beloved by skaters in winter and picnic parties in summer. Here comes every day at least one charabanc load of sightseers from Ambleside or Windermere". A wooden boat house that was still standing in the 1950s at the south east corner of the tarn probably dated from this period. In 1913 G.D. Abraham said "Tarn Hows is set wildly among larches and heather slopes, more like a highland lake than the other waters in Lakeland... more suitable for pedestrians than motorists".

=== Beatrix Potter ===
In 1930 the Marshall family wanted to sell their 4,000 acres (16 km^{2}) Monk Coniston estate. Beatrix Potter's husband, William Heelis of Sawrey, was solicitor for the Marshall family and so was aware of the possibility early on. One of the farms within the estate had previously been owned by Potter's great-grandfather and so Beatrix was interested in buying the estate as a whole rather than allowing it to be sold off piecemeal for tourist development; however, she could not afford the whole £15,000–£18,000 asking price without selling other properties that she wanted to keep. Neither the National Trust nor the Forestry Commission could obtain the whole sum quickly enough and Potter's mother would not lend her the money. Potter wrote that 'Tarn Hows is such a favourite walk that on the face of it you might think it was a case for public subscription; but it would not work. My mother is known to be so wealthy that nobody would subscribe to help me!'

Potter and Heelis negotiated to buy the whole estate for £15,000, relying on the National Trust to be able to appeal to the public to raise enough to buy back 2,090 acres from her. During the period when Potter and Heelis owned the whole estate it was successfully managed by the two of them. The National Trust's appeal had raised nearly enough before the summer of 1930 and they bought most of the land from Potter – she donated the last part anonymously. When the Trust took over in September it asked Potter to carry on managing the land on its behalf. Bruce Thompson, the National Trust agent for its properties in the north of England, wrote in The Lake District and the National Trust in 1936 that "The Tarns and its setting were given to the nation by Sir S. H. Scott in 1930 as part of the Trust's general scheme for securing a large part of the Monk Coniston estate. The gift was made in memory of Sir James and Lady Scott." Presumably he donated the funds to the appeal to buy this portion of the estate. The remaining half of the Monk Coniston estate was bequeathed by Potter in her will to the National Trust.

=== National Trust era ===
Tarn Hows was designated a Site of Special Scientific Interest in 1965.

The National Trust have made a number of more recent changes to the area including moving the car parks to a less obtrusive place in the 1960s and general footpath and road improvements to minimize the damage caused by the visitors. In May 2008 a building designed to harmonise with the landscape was opened, providing toilets and an information display under a sedum green roof.

== Protected area ==
Tarn Hows Site of Special Scientific Interest encompasses an area of 178 hectares that includes Lane Head Coppice, Harry Field Wood, Tom Heights and Tom Ghyll Waterfalls. This area is protected because of the aquatic plants and shoreline plants around the tarns and bog pools here.

=== Details of Tarn Hows SSSI ===
Plants around the margins of the tarns include common spike-rush, marsh pennywort, bog bean, branched bur-reed, unbranched bur-reed and small bur-reed. In shallow water there is water lobelia, shore weed and floating scirpus. In deeper water there is alternate flowered water-milfoil, greater bladderwort, white water lilies and yellow water lilies. Pondweed species include Potamogeton alpinus, Potamogeton natans, Potamogeton berchtoldii, Potamogeton obtusifolius, Potamogeton perfoliatus, Potamogeton praelongus and Potamogeton polygonifolius.

Trees in Lane Head Coppice include sessile oak. Trees in this woodland support lichen species including Lobaria pulmonaria, Thelotrema lepadinum and Lecidea cinnabarina.

All land within Tarn Hows SSSI is owned by the National Trust.

== Etymology ==
" 'The hills by the pool(s)'; 'tjǫrn/tarn', 'haugr/how(e).' There are five or six low hills, most of which form an intake. The pools, now amalgamated through damming, used to be separated by Tarn Moss and called 'The Tarns (High, Middle and Low Tarn)."'Tjǫrn' and 'haugr' are ON (Old Norse), 'tarn' is dialect;

== Gallery ==
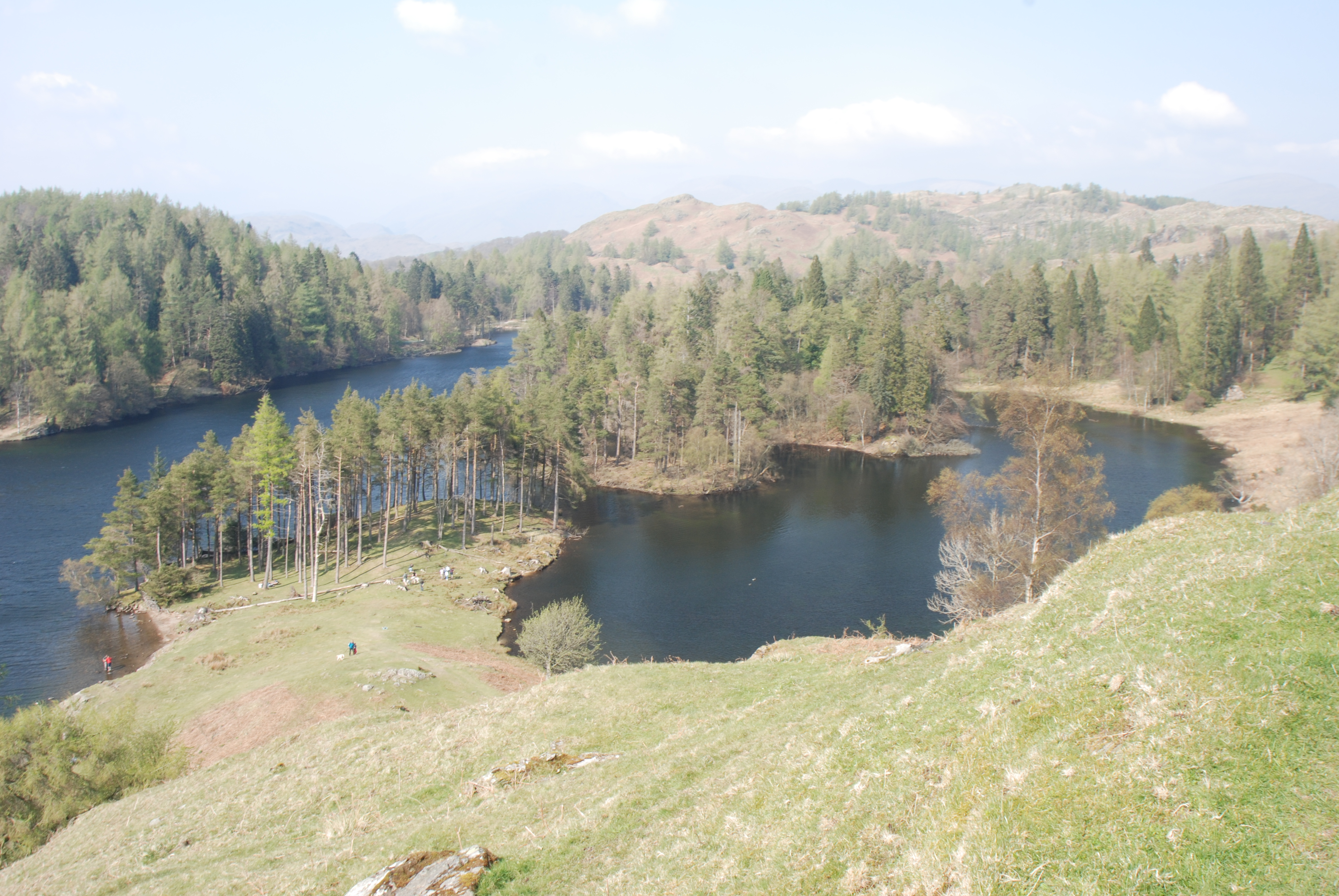
From above

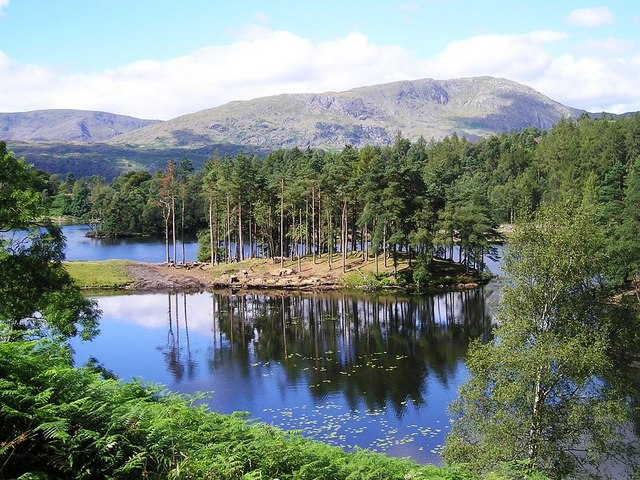
Summer 2005
