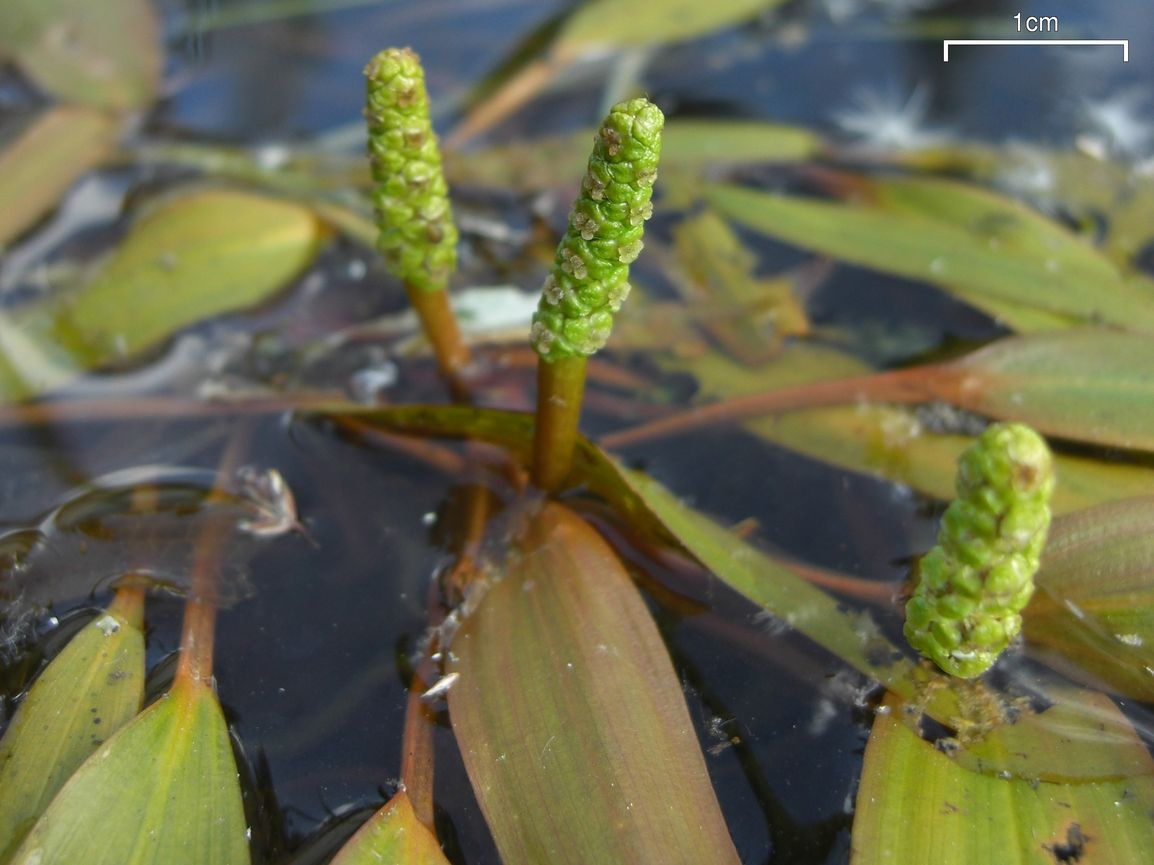

Scientific classification
- Kingdom: Plantae
- Clade: Tracheophytes
- Clade: Angiosperms
- Clade: Monocots
- Order: Alismatales
- Family: Potamogetonaceae
- Genus: Potamogeton
- Species: P. gramineus

Binomial name
- Potamogeton gramineus L.

Synonyms
- Potamogeton argutulus Hagstr.; Potamogeton augustani Bellardi; Potamogeton augustanus Balb.; Potamogeton biformoides Papch.; Potamogeton borealis Kihlm.; Potamogeton crassipes Kit. ex Cham. & Schlecht.; Potamogeton delicatulus Bertol.; Potamogeton distachyus Bellardi; Potamogeton falcatus Fryer; Potamogeton filiformis Pursh ex Tuck.; Potamogeton gracilis Wolfg..; Potamogeton graminifolius (Fr.) Benkö; Potamogeton heterophyllus Schreb.; Potamogeton heterophyllus Torr.; Potamogeton hybridus Petagna; Potamogeton lanceolatus Poir.; Potamogeton lanciformis Roem. & Schult.; Potamogeton latifolius Sloboda; Potamogeton longipedunculatus Mérat; Potamogeton oblongifolius Hook.f.; Potamogeton palustris Teesd.; Potamogeton paucifolius Opiz; Potamogeton seemenii Asch. & Graebn.; Potamogeton spathiformis Tuck. ex A.Gray; Potamogeton varians Morong ex Fryer; Potamogeton wolfgangii Kihlm.; Spirillus heterophyllus (Schreb.) Nieuwl.

= Potamogeton gramineus =

Species of aquatic plant

Potamogeton gramineus is a species of aquatic plant known by the common name various-leaved pondweed, variableleaf pondweed, grass-leaved pondweed or grassy pondweed, native to the northern hemisphere where it grows in shallow, clean water.

== Description ==
This is an aquatic perennial growing from a creeping rhizome that anchors in wet substrate. It produces thin, cylindrical, heavily branching stems usually less than a metre in length. The submerged leaves are sessile, relatively narrow, typically 40–90 mm long and 5–12 mm wide along the main stem but smaller on the side branches. They are translucent and pale green with a white midrib, and finely toothed. Floating leaves are more oval in shape, 20–70 mm long by 7–34 mm wide, and borne on long petioles. The inflorescence is a short spike of many flowers arising from the water on a stout peduncle.

This species readily hybridizes with many other species of Potamogeton. Hybrids have been recorded with P. perfoliatus (P. × nitens Weber), P. lucens (P. × angustifolius J.Presl.), P. natans (P. × sparganiifolius Laest. ex Fr.), P. coloratus (P. × billupsii Fryer), P. maackianus (P. × biwaensis Miki), P. illinoensis (P. × spathuliformis (J.W.Robbins) Morong), P. richardsonii (P. × hagstromii A.Benn.), P. alpinus (P. × nericius Hagstr.), P. nodosus (P. × lanceolatifolius (Tiselius) C.D.Preston), P. oakesianus (P. × mirabilis Z.Kaplan, Hellq. & Fehrer) and P. polygonifolius. In Britain, P. x nitens and P. x angustifolius are quite common. Recent molecular analysis has shown that Swedish collections of the putative hybrid P. gramineus x P. polygonifolius are in fact P. gramineus x P. nodosus.

A triple hybrid, P. gramineus × lucens × perfoliatus (P. × torssandrii (Tiselius) Dörfler), is also known.

As well as hybridising frequently, various-leaved pondweed is an extremely variable plant and care should be taken with its identification.

== Taxonomy ==
Potamogeton gramineus (gramineus meaning 'grasslike') was one of the original species named by Linnaeus in Species Plantarum (1753). However, due to its highly variable nature and propensity for hybridisation, various-leaved pondweed has received a bewildering number of synonyms.

DNA analysis indicates that P. gramineus is one of the broad-leaved pondweed clade (section Potamogeton) and is probably most closely related to the P. lucens group.

== Distribution ==
Potamogeton gramineus is native to much of the Northern Hemisphere, with a Holarctic distribution. It occurs in northern Europe (Britain, Ireland, Iceland, Scandinavia, Germany, Switzerland, France, Poland, Russia, the Baltic States), Greenland, North America (US except for the southeast, Canada). There are outlying populations in southern Europe (Iberia, Corsica, Italy), Caucasus, Pyrenees, and western US.

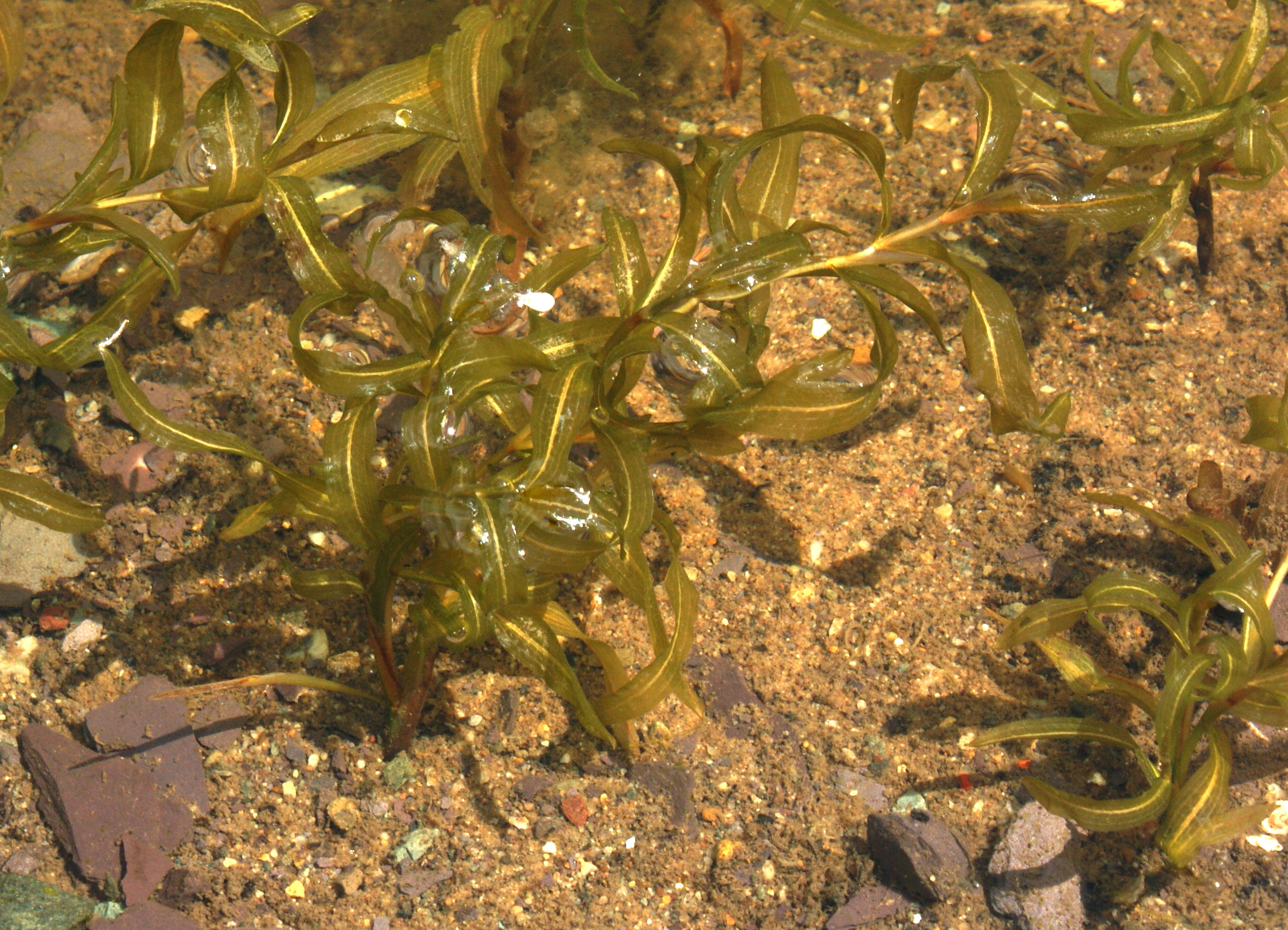
Various-leaved pondweed, Potamogeton gramineus, in a garden pond.

== Ecology and conservation ==
Various-leaved pondweed grows in various water body types including ponds, lakes, bogs, ditches and streams. It is usually restricted to shallower water <1 m deep, though it has been recorded growing at more than 5 m depth in very clear, oligotrophic water in Llynnau Cregennen, Wales. It is intolerant of nutrient pollution and is not usually found in base-poor water of alkalinity less than about 200 μEq/L. The roots penetrate to a depth of about 10 cm. In Michigan streams, P. gramineus is restricted to riffles with warmer interstitial temperatures.

Grazing by waterfowl can have a significant effect on various-leaved pondweed. In Sentiz Lake (Leon, Spain), P. gramineus was sparse and the dominant plants were Ceratophyllum demersum and Myriophyllum spicatum. However, within experimental cages from which waterfowl were excluded, P. gramineus became co-dominant and developed both flowers and floating leaves.

In Britain, it has shown the same pattern of decline as other broad-leaved pondweeds such as P. praelongus and P. alpinus, with most losses occurring in southern Britain, and is now classed as near threatened in England. This likely reflects increasing eutrophication, canalization of rivers leading to loss of backwater habitats and other floodplain standing waters, and degradation or loss of pond and lake habitats. P. gramineus may also grow in open reedbeds, and the loss of traditional reed cutting practices may have caused the loss of populations from this habitat. It is Critically Endangered in the Czech Republic, Endangered in Germany, Flanders and Switzerland, Near Threatened in the Netherlands, and scarce and of conservation importance in Spain. Local extinction has also been recorded in Lower Saxony between 1948 and 1986. In the US, P. gramineus is listed as Threatened in Illinois and Endangered in Ohio and Pennsylvania.

Indices of environmental tolerance using trophic ranking schemes in Europe tend to show P. gramineus to be one of the more nutrient-sensitive aquatic plants. Studies in the Netherlands show P. gramineus to be associated with Littorelletea lakes, and to be one of a suite of species sensitive to acidification. Various-leaved pondweed is one of the so-called Magnopotamion group of pondweeds. These are a characteristic floristic component of the protected Habitats Directive habitat Type 'Natural eutrophic lakes with Magnopotamion'. However, in Britain P. gramineus also occurs in waters with lower nutrient concentrations and is considered a characteristic species of mesotrophic lakes.

== Cultivation ==
Potamogeton gramineus is not in general cultivation, though it is an attractive plant and grows well in a garden pond or barrel. Its slower growth than most submerged species, attractive leaves and habit of producing a limited number of floating leaves make it very ornamental and suitable for garden ponds, and its smaller size than many other pondweeds is also a benefit. In common with other pondweeds of this group it roots poorly from stem cuttings and is best propagated by division of the rhizomes.
