= River Eye SSSI =

Protected area in Leicestershire, England

Coordinates: 52.759°N 0.855°W

River Eye
- Site of Special Scientific Interest
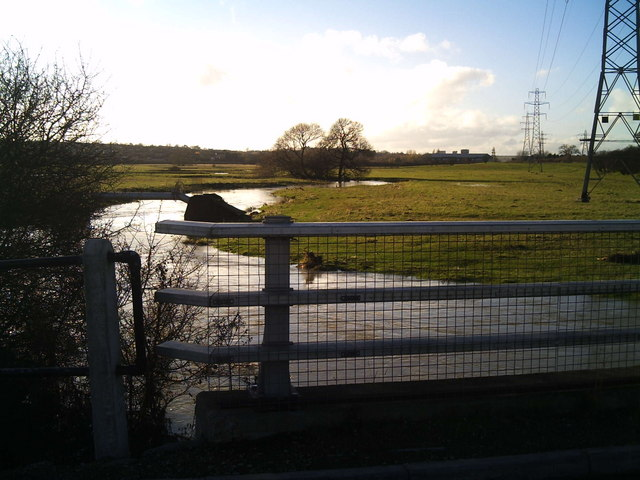
- Location of River Eye.
- Area of search: Leicestershire
- Grid reference: SK 777 186
- Interest: Biological
- Area: 6.0 hectares (15 acres)
- Notification date: 1983
- Location map: Magic Map

River Eye SSSI is a 6.0 hectares (15 acres) biological Site of Special Scientific Interest covering a stretch of the River Eye between Ham Bridge, north-west of Stapleford, and the eastern outskirts of Melton Mowbray in Leicestershire. It is a Nature Conservation Review site.

This unpolluted clay stream has rich and diverse flora and fauna. Marginal vegetation includes bulrush, branched bur-reed and greater pond sedge, while shallow, fast-flowing stretches have curled pondweed and perfoliate pondweed.

The river runs through private land but it is crossed by roads and footpaths.
