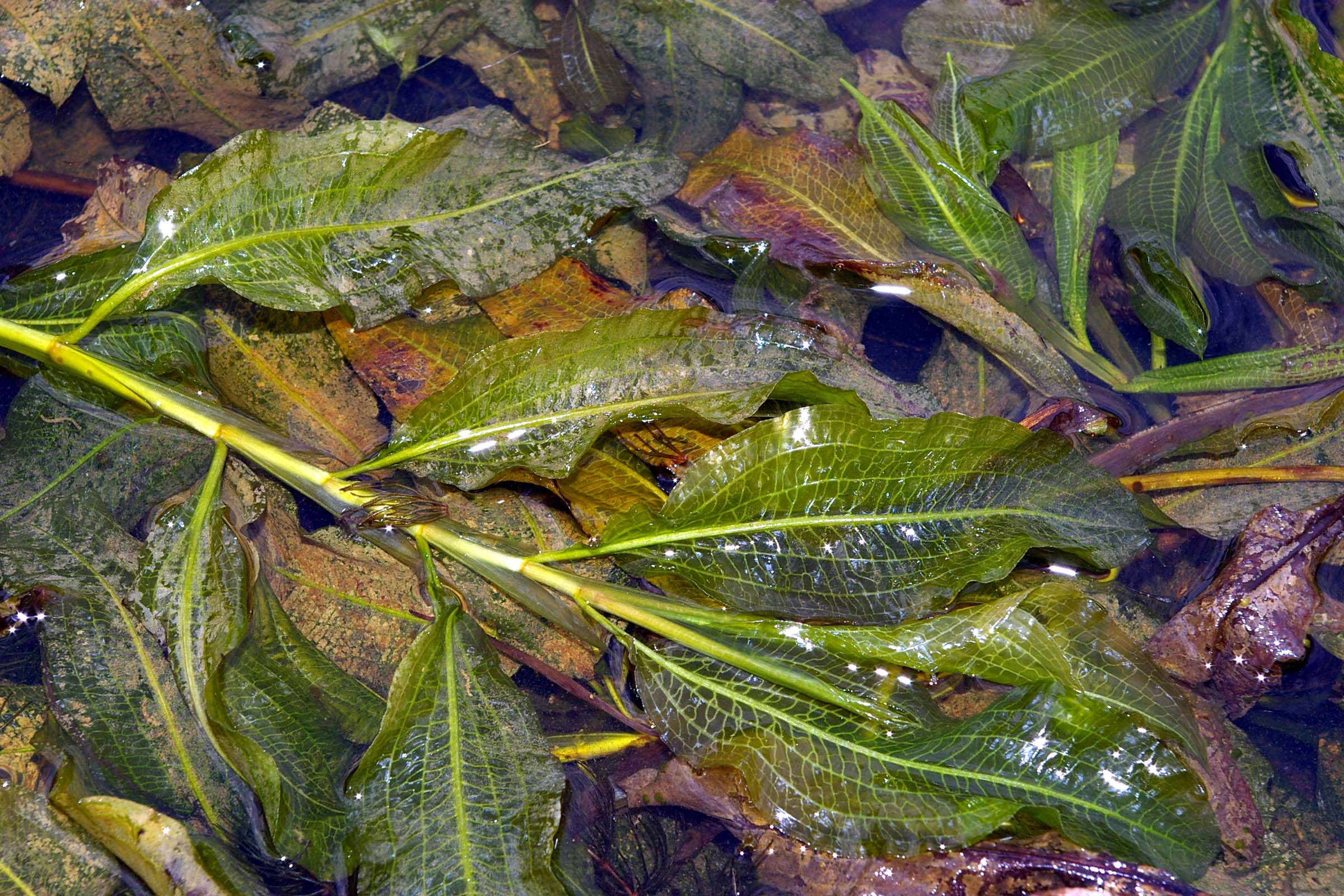

Conservation status
- Least Concern (IUCN 3.1)

Scientific classification
- Kingdom: Plantae
- Clade: Tracheophytes
- Clade: Angiosperms
- Clade: Monocots
- Order: Alismatales
- Family: Potamogetonaceae
- Genus: Potamogeton
- Species: P. lucens

Binomial name
- Potamogeton lucens L.

Synonyms
- Buccaferrea lucida Bubani; Potamogeton acuminatus Schumach.; Potamogeton americanus Roem. & Schult.; Potamogeton angustifolius Bercht. & J.Presl. ex Opiz; Potamogeton caudatus Seidl ex Opiz; Potamogeton coriaceus (Nolte ex Mert. & W.D.J.Koch) Fryer; Potamogeton corniculatus Schur; Potamogeton cornutus J.Presl. & C.Presl.; Potamogeton dentatus Hagstr.; Potamogeton gaudichaudii Cham. & Schltdl.; Potamogeton gramineus subsp. zizii (Mert. & W.D.J.Koch) K.Richt.; Potamogeton lanceolatus Eichw.; Potamogeton lindenbergii Lehm. ex Graebn.; Potamogeton longifolius J.Gay ex Poir.; Potamogeton lucidus Gueldenst.; Potamogeton macrophyllus Wolfg.; Potamogeton nitens Willd. ex Cham & Schltdl.; Potamogeton proteus Cham & Schltdl.; Potamogeton pseudolongifolius Papch.; Potamogeton rotundifolius Schultz; Potamogeton sinicus Migo; Potamogeton teganumensis (Makino) Makino; Potamogeton volhynicus Besser ex Roem. & Schult.; Potamogeton zizii Mert. & W.D.J.Koch; Potamogeton zizii Koch ex Roth; Spirillus lucens (L.) Nieuwl.; Spirillus zizii (Mert. & W.D.J.Koch) Nieuwl.

= Potamogeton lucens =

Species of aquatic plant

Potamogeton lucens, or shining pondweed, is an aquatic perennial plant native to Eurasia and North Africa. It grows in relatively deep, still or slow-flowing, calcareous freshwater habitats.

== Description ==
Shining pondweed is a large plant with robust creeping rhizomes and long, terete, branching stems, typically up to 2.5 m but exceptionally to 6 m. The leaves are large, 75–200 mm (exceptionally more) long and 25–65 mm wide, 2–6 times as long as broad; as with the smaller P. gramineus, the leaves on the branches are smaller than those on the main stem. The leaves are pale green or yellowish, translucent, shiny with distinctive netted veining, minutely denticulate margins, and a short petiole of 1–12 mm. Floating leaves are absent.

Flowers appear between June and September. The fruits are 3 mm across.

Like most other broad-leaved pondweeds, Potamogeton lucens is tetraploid, with 2n=52.

Over much of its range, shining pondweed is not likely to be confused with any other species. However, in southern Europe the related and quite similar P. schweinfurthii has recently been discovered. P. lucens can usually be distinguished by its relatively broader leaves, 2–6 times as long as they are broad, and most or all of which are petiolate, but some forms are very difficult to distinguish without a detailed comparison of multiple characters.

However, there are hybrids with various other pondweed species including P. gramineus (P. × angustifolius J.Presl.), P. perfoliatus (P. × salicifolius Wolfg.), P. alpinus (P. × nerviger Wolfg.), P. nodosus (P. × subrufus Hagstr.) P. sarmaticus (P. × pseudosarmaticus Papch.), P. crispus (P. × cadburyae Dandy & G.Taylor), P. praelongus (P. × jutlandicus Zalewska-Gał.) and P. natans (P. × fluitans Roth). It hybridises with P. wrightii (P. × inbaensis Kadono) in Japan and China. Some of these hybrids can be quite common, and are not always easy to distinguish from P. lucens.

A triple hybrid, P. gramineus × lucens × perfoliatus (P. × torssandrii (Tiselius) Dörfler), is also known.

== Taxonomy ==
Potamogeton lucens (lucens meaning 'shining') was one of the original species named by Linnaeus in Species Plantarum (1753). Shining pondweed is morphologically quite variable, and as a result has received a bewildering number of synonyms.

DNA analysis indicates that P. lucens is one of the broad-leaved pondweed clade (section Potamogeton) and is probably most closely related to P. gramineus and the North American P. illinoensis.

== Distribution ==
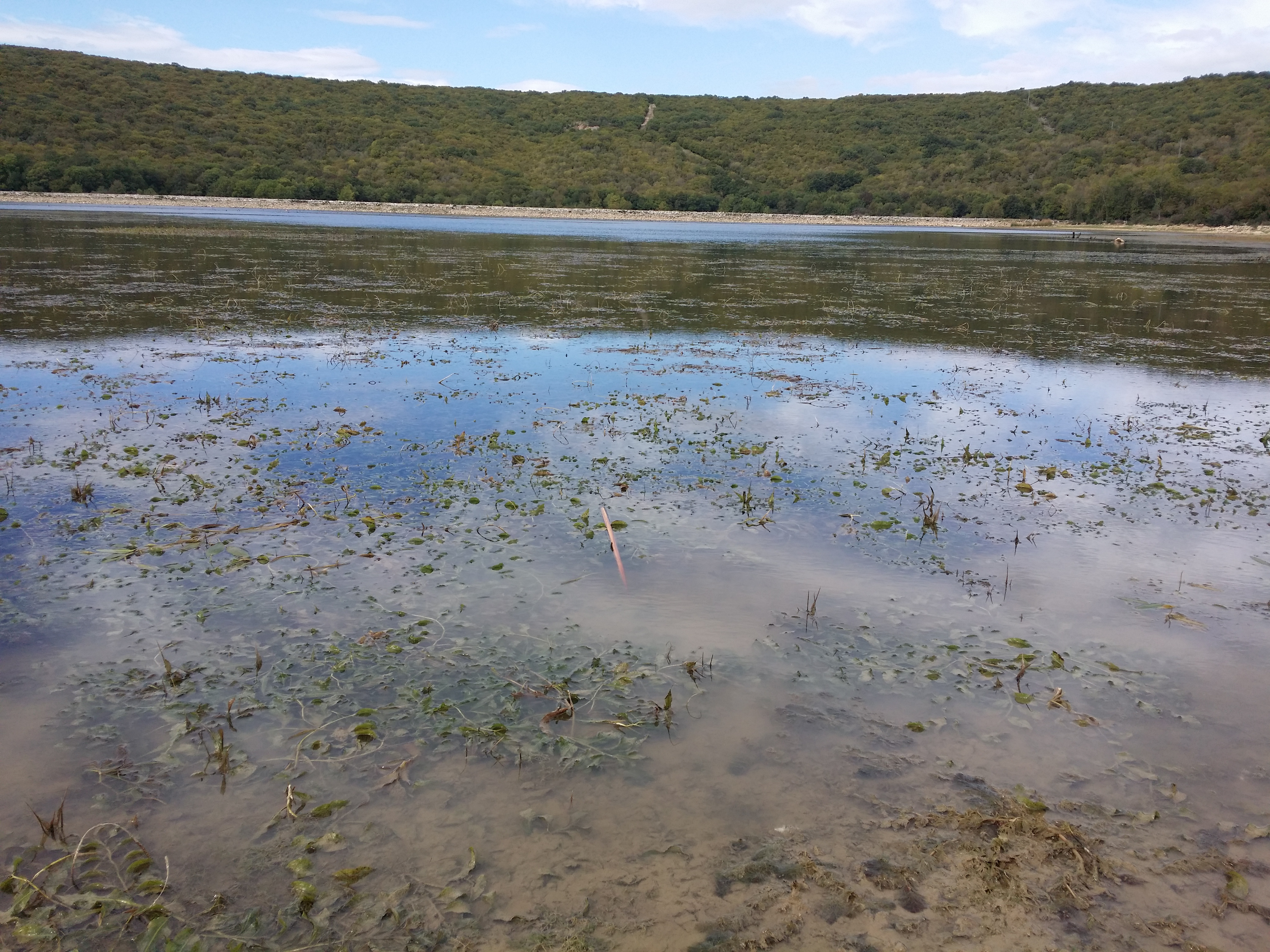
Growing in the polje of Ponikve on Krk.

Potamogeton lucens is native to Europe (including Britain, continental Europe, Scandinavia), Asia (Afghanistan, India, Kazakhstan, Kyrgyzstan, Myanmar, Nepal, Pakistan, Philippines, Russia, Tajikistan, Turkmenistan, Uzbekistan), the Middle East and North Africa. In North America it is replaced by the rather similar P. illinoensis.

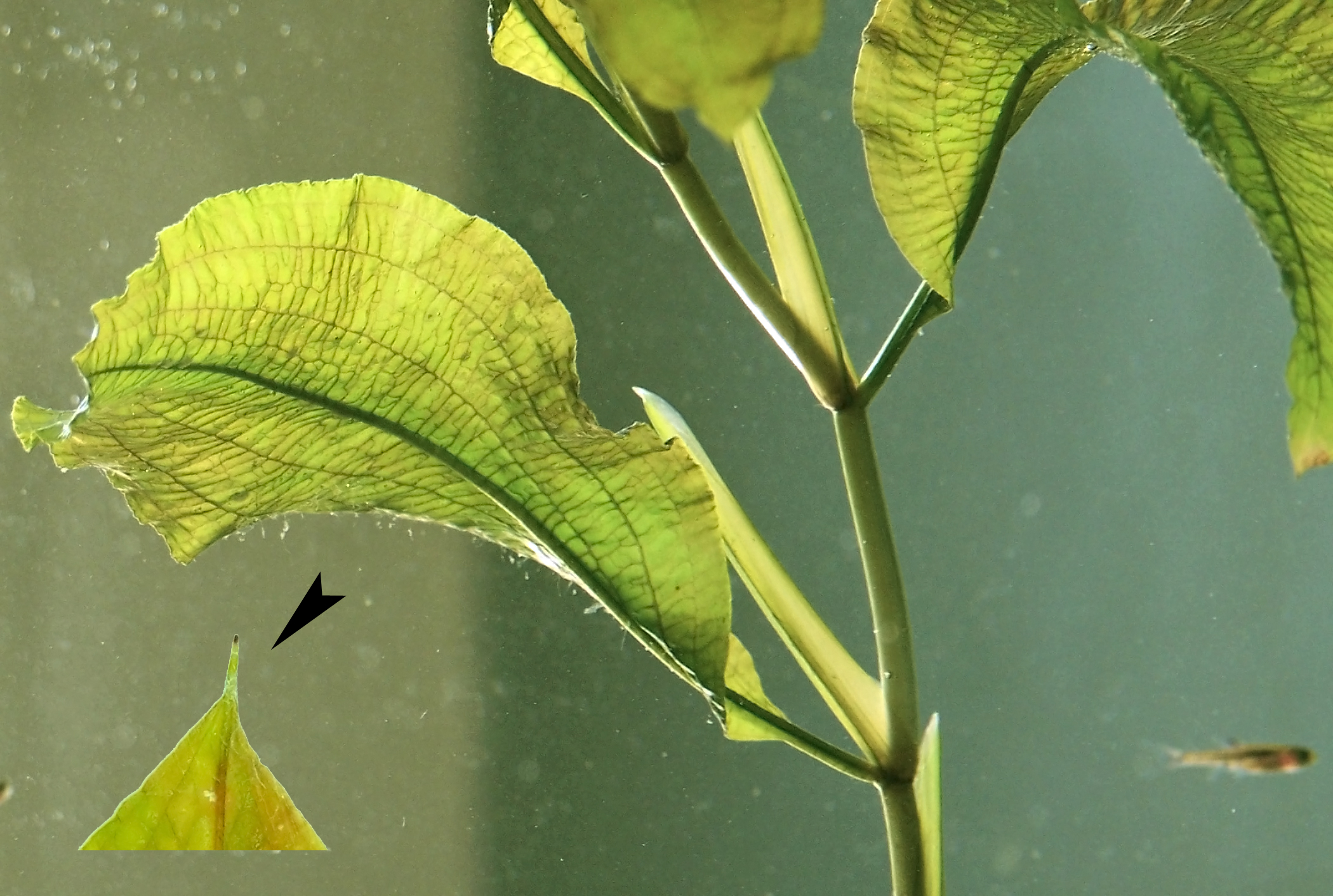
Detail of stem and leaves

== Biochemistry ==
A furanolabdane diterpenoid extracted from P. lucens is algicidal.

Dried and ground shining pondweed has been shown to be effective at binding heavy metals, raising the possibility of using biomass from this plant as a means of treating contaminated sediments.

== Ecology and conservation ==
Potamogeton lucens is strictly a lowland plant of standing or slow-flowing calcareous water, especially favouring peatland areas with a calcareous water supply such as the Cambridgeshire Fens. Although having a preference for deep water (0.5–2.0 m), it can persist in shallow areas, and may also grow in open reedbeds, which may provide a refuge in eutrophic waters.

Shining pondweed is more prevalent in older, poorly connected floodplain lakes and is a poor colonizer, slow to regenerate following floods and intolerant of drawdown. In Britain shining pondweed is mainly restricted to southern England with scattered outposts in Scotland and Wales, but is more widespread in Ireland. It is tolerant of eutrophication to some extent and in marl lakes it may replace Chara spp. as nutrient levels increase, before itself being ousted by fine-leaved pondweeds and eventually phytoplankton at higher nutrient levels. In a study of nutrient-rich river backwaters in the R. Tisza (Hungary), shining pondweed was tolerant of very high phosphate concentrations, so long as chemical oxygen demand and chlorophyll-a concentrations in the water were not too high. In the Netherlands, the invasive Elodea nuttallii may compete with it for habitat.

Globally and on the majority of national Red Lists, shining pondweed is not considered threatened. P. lucens has declined somewhat in Britain, but still remains reasonably widespread.

Shining pondweed is one of the so-called Magnopotamion group of pondweeds. These are a characteristic floristic component of the protected Habitats Directive habitat Type 'Natural eutrophic lakes with Magnopotamion'.

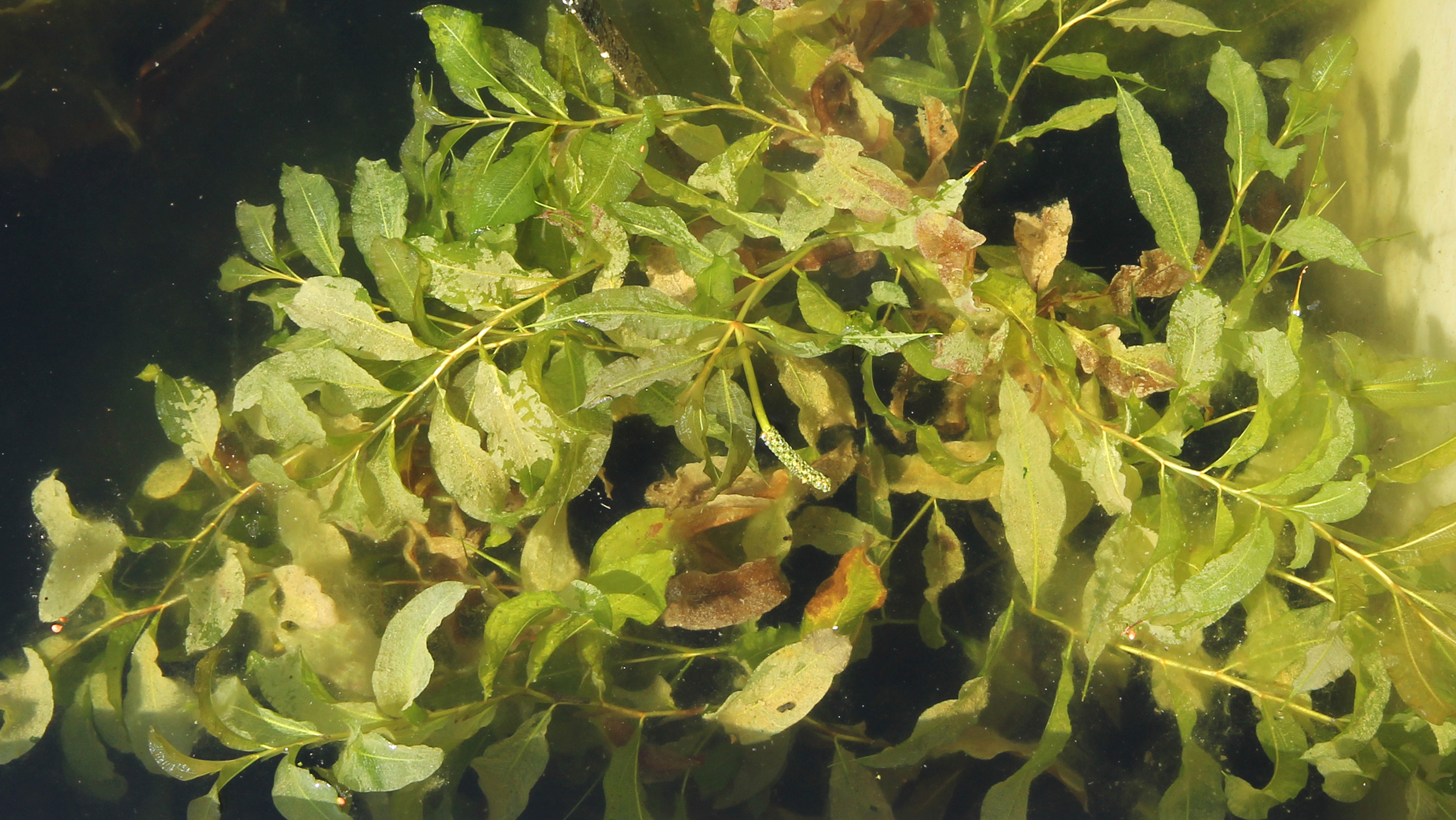
Potamogeton lucens, general habit

== Cultivation ==
Shining pondweed is rarely cultivated, even though it is both easy to grow and an attractive plant. Its distinctive, large, transparent netted leaves are unlike any other commonly cultivated pond plant. In common with other pondweeds of this group it roots poorly from stem cuttings and is best propagated by division of the rhizomes. It is easy to grow in a garden pond or even in a barrel, but unlike some other submerged plants needs to be able to root in a suitable substrate such as sand or aquatic compost. Plants being established should be weighted down initially to allow them to root. Where waterfowl grazing is likely, protection will be necessary, especially in the early summer growth period.

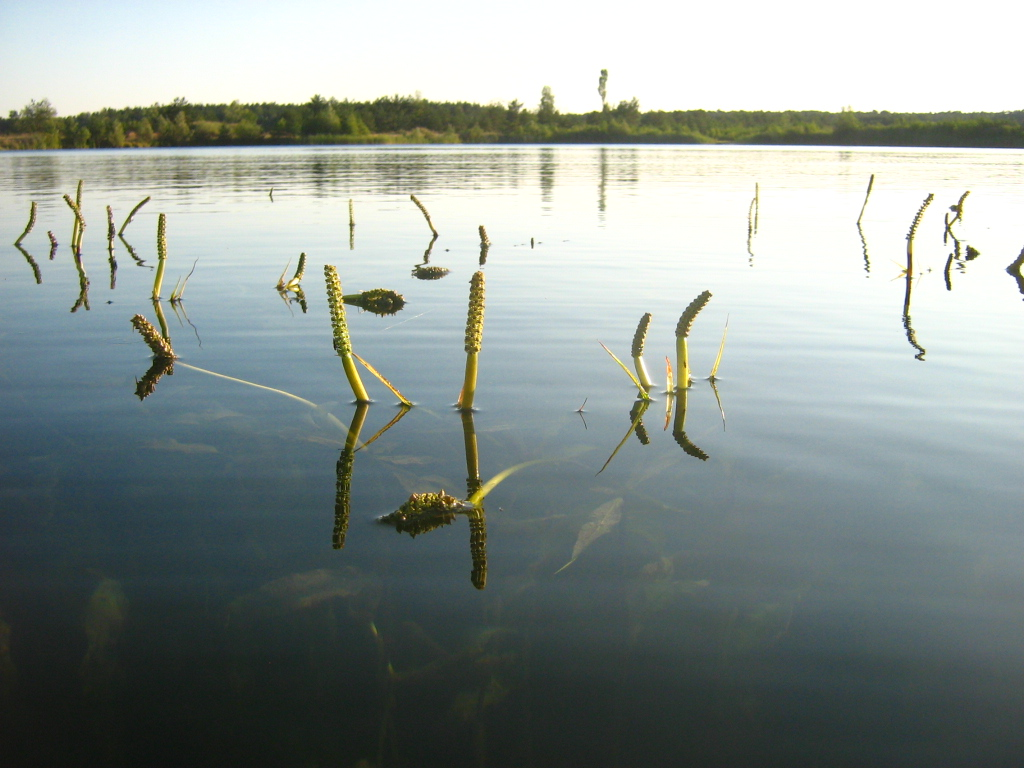
Shining pondweed flowering in a lake in Vorpommern (Western Pomerania), Germany.
