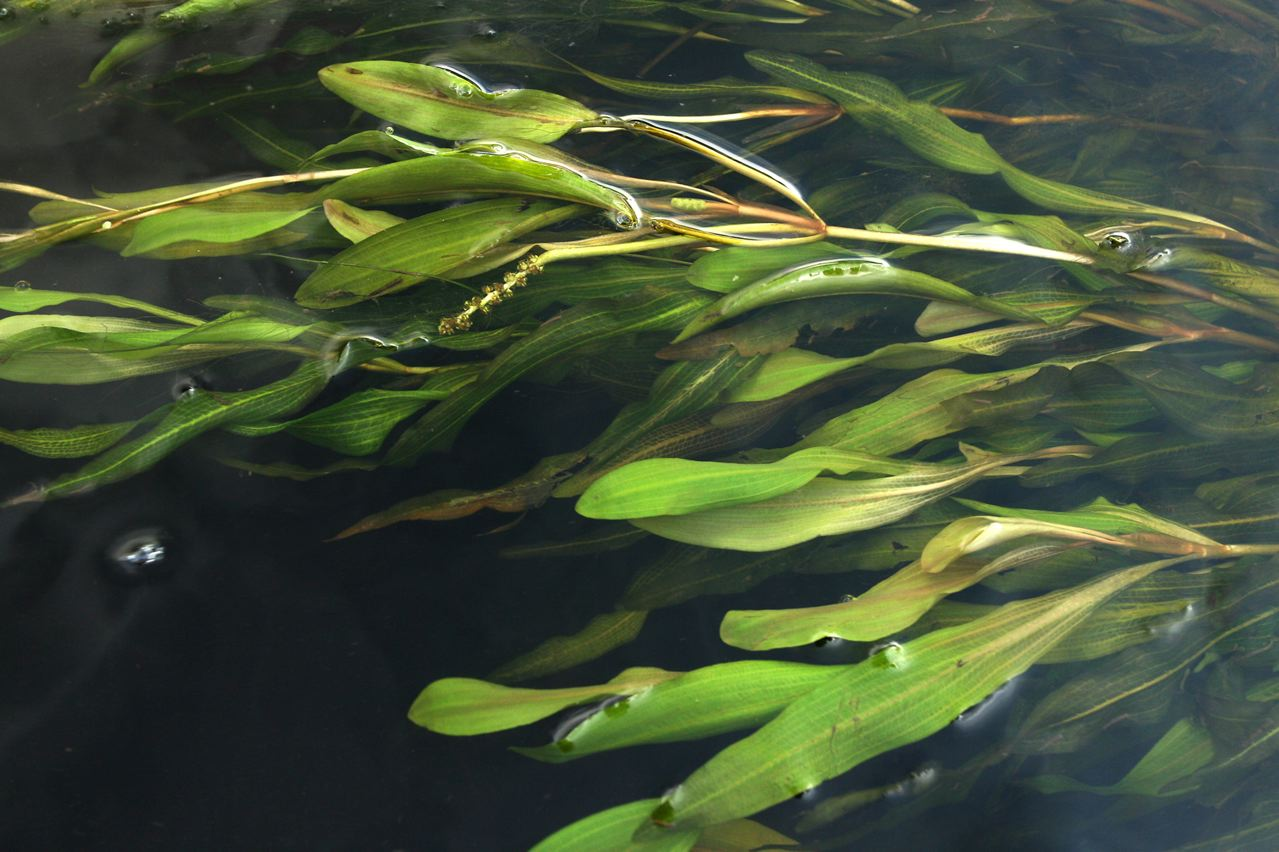
- Robust form of Potamogeton alpinus in a river in Russia.

Scientific classification
- Kingdom: Plantae
- Clade: Tracheophytes
- Clade: Angiosperms
- Clade: Monocots
- Order: Alismatales
- Family: Potamogetonaceae
- Genus: Potamogeton
- Species: P. alpinus

Binomial name
- Potamogeton alpinus Balb.

Synonyms
- Buccaferrea rufescens (Schrad.) Bubani; Potamogeton alpinonatans F.W.Schultz; Potamogeton annulatus Bellardi; Potamogeton casparii Weyl; Potamogeton microstachys Wolfg.; Potamogeton montanensis Gand.; Potamogeton nigrescens Fr.; Potamogeton obrutus Alph.Wood.; Potamogeton obscurus DC; Potamogeton obtusus Ducros ex Gaud.; Potamogeton purpurascens Seidl ex J.Presl. & C.Presl.; Potamogeton rigidus Wolfg.; Potamogeton rufescens Schrad.; Potamogeton semipellucidus W.D.J.Koch & Ziz; Potamogeton stylatus Hagstr.; Potamogeton thomasii A.Benn.

= Potamogeton alpinus =

Species of flowering plant

Potamogeton alpinus is a species of perennial aquatic plant known by the common names alpine pondweed and red pondweed. It is widespread in the northern hemisphere in both rivers and lakes with good water quality.

== Description ==
Red pondweed is a perennial herb anchoring in the mud substrate via a creeping rhizome. It produces a cylindrical unbranched stem, up to 2.8 m in length. It has sessile lance-shaped submerged leaves that are typically 70–180 mm long and 10–25 mm wide with 4–7 lateral veins on either side and a slightly hooded apex, with an untoothed margin. Floating leaves may also be produced. The inflorescence is a spike of flowers a few centimeters long rising above the water surface. Turions are absent, but in winter each stem dies back to a resting bud with a short length of root, which acts as a functional turion.

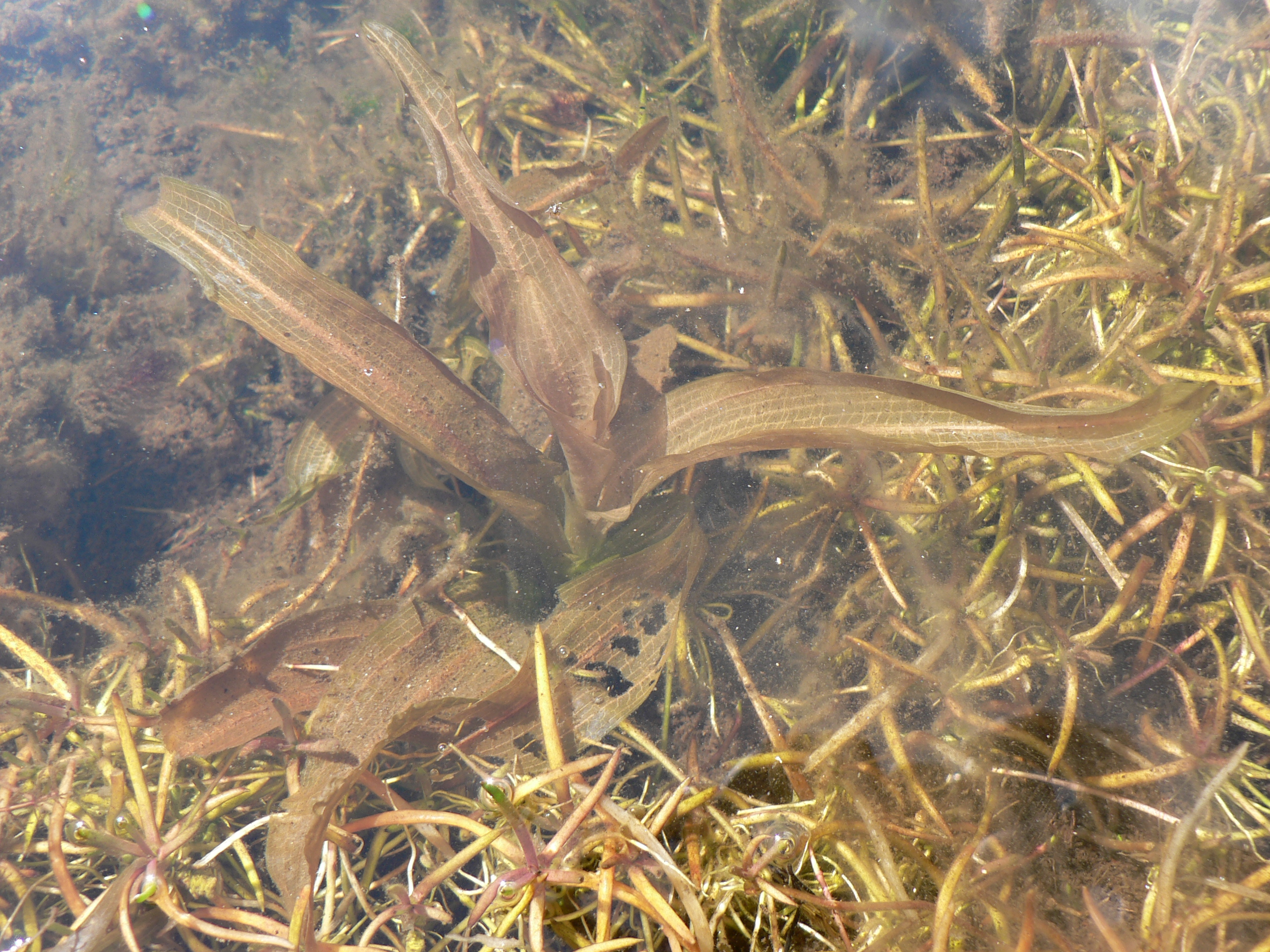
Red pondweed Potamogeton alpinus and shoreweed Littorella uniflora growing in a stream pool in North Wales.

Red pondweed is a reasonably distinctive plant and is not likely to be confused with any other pondweed. Early in the growing season it could be confused with P. polygonifolius, but the submerged leaves of the latter have petioles and are relatively longer. P. praelongus is generally greener with noticeably white, zig-zagged stems that generally branch, never produces floating leaves, and its submerged leaves clasp the stem. Fresh specimens often, but not always, show a reddish tint, but this becomes much more obvious in dried material. Despite its name it is neither restricted to alpine regions or unique among pondweeds in having a reddish colouration.

Chromosome counts show that, like most other broad-leaved pondweeds, P. alpinus is tetraploid, with 2n=52 chromosomes.

Hybrids have been described with P. crispus (P. × olivaceus Baagøe ex G.Fisch.), P. gramineus (P. × nericius Hagstr.), P. natans (P. × exilis Z.Kaplan & Uotila), P. nodosus (P. × argutulus Hagstr.), P. lucens (P. × nerviger Wolfg.), P. perfoliatus (P. × prussicus Hagstr.), P. polygonifolus, (P. × spathulatus Schrad. ex W.D.J.Koch & Ziz), and P. praelongus (P. × griffithii A. Benn.). All are rather rare, but where they do occur they may be locally abundant and long-lived.

== Taxonomy ==
Potamogeton alpinus was described by the Italian botanist Giovanni Balbis in 1804. The species name means 'alpine'.

Like many other pondweeds, the variability in growth form of P. alpinus in response to environmental conditions (phenotypic plasticity) and across its geographical range has led to it accumulating a number of synonyms.

== Distribution ==
Red pondweed is native to much of the Northern Hemisphere, including Asia (Afghanistan, China (Heilongjiang), India (Assam), Japan, Kazakhstan, Korea, Myanmar, Pakistan, Russia, Uzbekistan), Europe (Austria, Belgium, Britain, Denmark, Estonia, France including Corsica, Germany, Ireland, Iceland, Latvia, Lithuania, Netherlands, Norway, Poland, Spain (Pyrenees), Sweden, Switzerland), Greenland, Canada, and the northern United States, especially the Rockies.

== Ecology and conservation ==
Potamogeton alpinus generally grows in neutral to mildly acid (but not very base-poor) water bodies such as lakes, slow-moving rivers and streams, and ponds. P. alpinus needs a deep fine substrate such as sand, silt or peat to root in and appears to avoid exposed situations. It is mainly restricted to fairly nutrient-poor waters. In European rivers, it is associated with high quality environments. In a large-scale study of the plant communities of 3447 British lakes, red pondweed was found in 169, with a preference for circumneutral, moderate alkalinity lakes. Unlike other broad-leaved pondweeds, the stolons of red pondweed die back in winter, leaving constellations of resting buds rooted in the substrate, which regrow in spring. In rivers, red pondweed can persist entirely by asexual means (rooting of stem fragments and turion-like resting bodies, and growth in summer) though this may reflect weed cutting suppressing flowering and seed set.

In Britain P. alpinus has declined markedly, especially in the south, though it still occurs throughout Britain. In Wales red pondweed was recently assessed as Critically Endangered, and in England it is categorised as Vulnerable. Declines have also been reported elsewhere in Europe and North America; it is Regionally Extinct in Luxemburg and Pennsylvania, Critically Endangered in Spain, Vulnerable in Germany and the Netherlands, Endangered in the Czech Republic, the Carpathian region, Flanders and New Jersey and threatened in New Hampshire and New York. This is likely related to a combination of eutrophication, infilling of ponds and canalization of rivers. It is still widespread in Scotland and Ireland and presumably in other more sparsely populated parts of its range such as Canada, Scandinavia and Siberia.

Red pondweed is one of the so-called Magnopotamion group of pondweeds. These are a characteristic floristic component of the protected Habitats Directive habitat Type 'Natural eutrophic lakes with Magnopotamion'.

== Cultivation ==
Potamogeton alpinus is not in widespread cultivation, and seems to be rather difficult to maintain, competing poorly with other pond plants. It is possible that this is related to its preference for a deep fine substrate. In common with other pondweeds of this group it roots poorly from stem cuttings and is best propagated by division of the rhizomes.

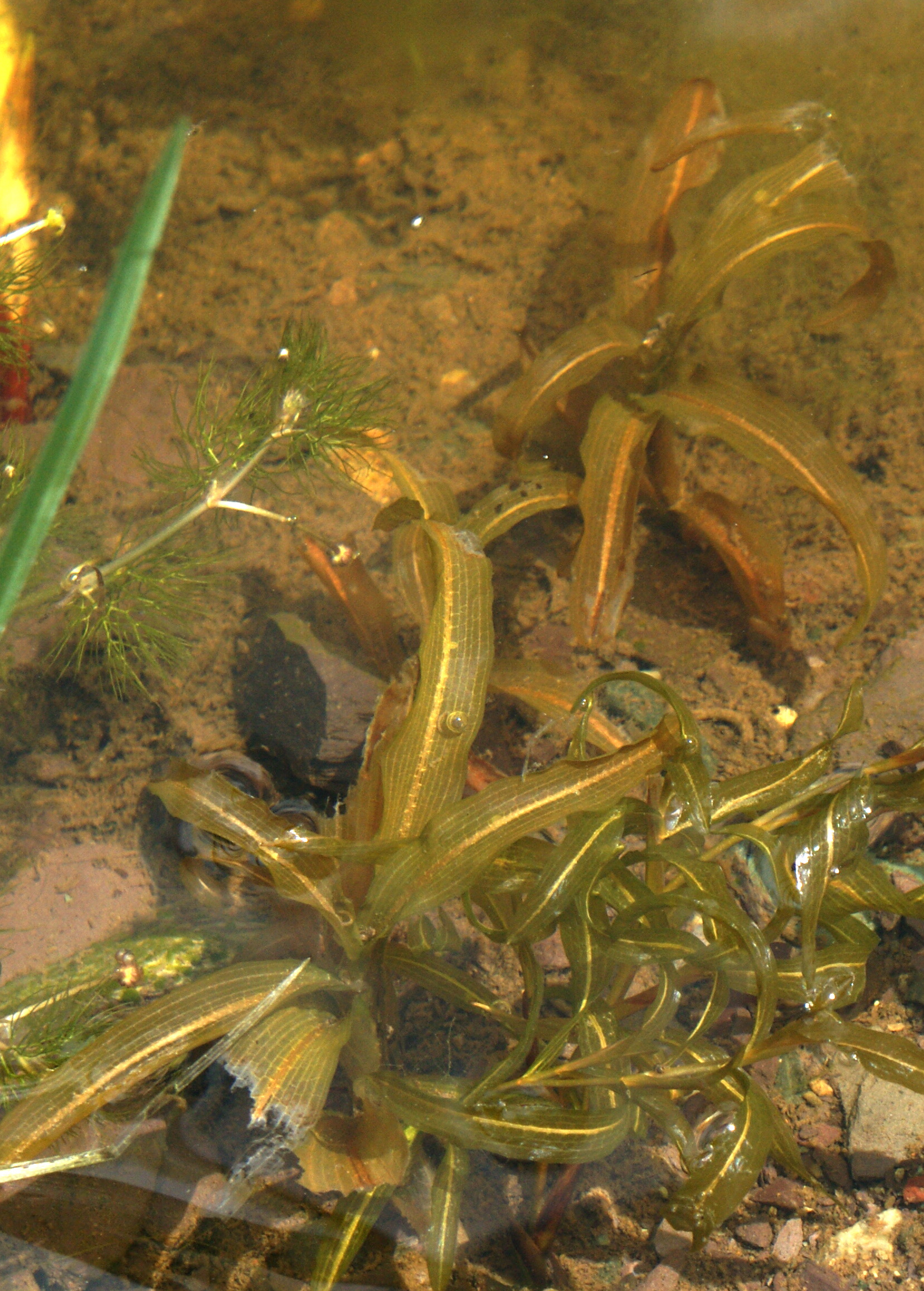
Red pondweed (Potamogeton alpinus) in cultivation (Wales, UK). The smaller, greener leaved plant is Potamogeton gramineus.
