= Potamogeton × griffithii =

Scientific classification
- Kingdom: Plantae
- Clade: Tracheophytes
- Clade: Angiosperms
- Clade: Monocots
- Order: Alismatales
- Family: Potamogetonaceae
- Genus: Potamogeton
- Species: P. × griffithii

Binomial name
- Potamogeton × griffithii A. Bennett

Species of flowering plant

Potamogeton × griffithii is a hybrid pondweed between Potamogeton alpinus and Potamogeton praelongus. It occurs in oligotrophic, moderate alkalinity lakes.

== Description ==
Potamogeton × griffithii is a sterile hybrid pondweed between red pondweed Potamogeton alpinus and long-stalked pondweed Potamogeton praelongus. It occurs in clear, oligotrophic, low to moderate alkalinity lakes. It was discovered in 1882 in Llyn Anafon, North Wales by J.E. Griffith, a Victorian botanist, and was named after him by the noted pondweed expert Arthur Bennett.

Although intermediate in character between the parents, Potamogeton x griffithii is unlikely to be confused with either. It has long, branched stems to at least 1.7 m and probably longer, growing from slender perennial rhizomes. The translucent mid to deep green leaves are typically between 120 and 240 mm long, occasionally reach 330 mm and are 10–25 mm wide and hooded at the tip. The leaves are sessile, sometimes slightly clasping the stem but shortly petiolate leaves may also be present. The stipules are persistent, open, colourless with a milky tinge, and opaque when dry. Floating leaves may be produced and are relatively narrow, 85–105 x 13–25 mm. Turions are absent. The inflorescences are 10–20 mm long and have inconspicuous greenish flowers on robust peduncles 45–190 mm long. Fruits are not produced.

Potamogeton × griffithii is relatively easy to identify. It is larger than P. alpinus, and the branching habit immediately distinguishes the two. The leaf tip is also more distinctly hooded. The leaves are relatively longer than P. praelongus and P. perfoliatus, and mostly do not clasp the stem. The stems are also markedly more slender than P. praelongus and do not develop the characteristic 'zigzag' pattern caused by the stem changing the angle of growth at each node.

== Distribution ==
Potamogeton × griffithii is a rare hybrid. As well as its type locality in Wales, it has also been found in a lake in the north of Ireland, and in two lakes in western Scotland. In North America, it has been recorded from three locations in the US, all in Wisconsin, and in Canada (Alberta).

== Ecological requirements and conservation ==
In Llyn Anafon, Potamogeton x griffithii grows in clear, oligotrophic water with some basic influence, 0.75–3.2 m deep, among beds of Chara virgata and in shallower water, in a more diverse community including Nitella opaca, N. translucens, Utricularia minor, Juncus bulbosus, Isoetes lacustris and Callitriche brutia var. hamulata. One of the parents, Potamogeton alpinus, grows in the inflow stream, but P. praelongus has never been recorded in or near the lake. It is likely that the beds of P. × griffithii here have been established for centuries, perhaps even millennia. P. praelongus has not been recorded at any of the British and Irish sites where P. × griffithii grows.

Potamogeton × griffithii is classified as Vulnerable by both the British and Welsh Vascular Plant Red Lists due to the low number of sites in which it occurs.

== Cultivation ==
Potamogeton × griffithii is not in general cultivation, though like both of its parents it is an attractive plant. A patch has been established in a wildlife pond in Bangor University's Treborth Botanic Garden, where it grows well on a sandy substrate in about 1 m depth. In common with other pondweeds of this group it roots poorly from stem cuttings and is best propagated by division of the rhizomes. Good water quality is needed to reduce the risk of turbid water or growth of blanket weed.
