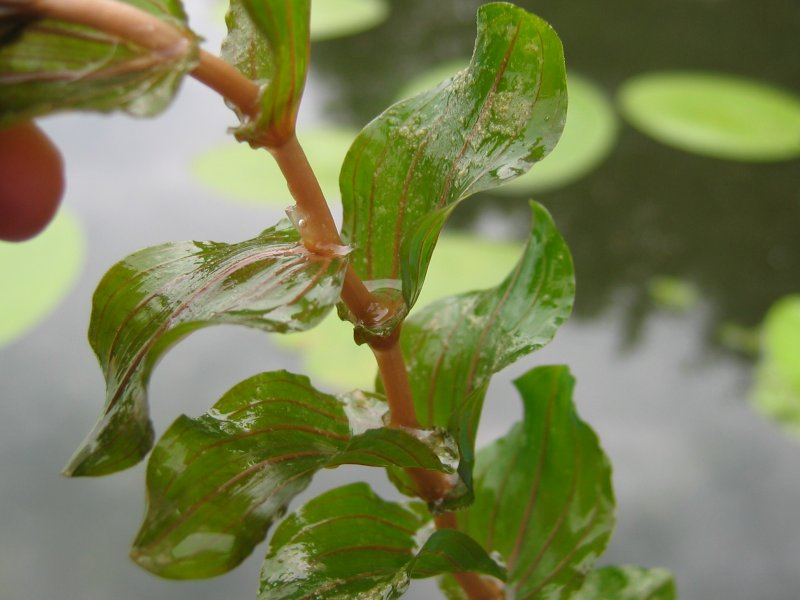

Conservation status
- Least Concern (IUCN 3.1)

Scientific classification
- Kingdom: Plantae
- Clade: Tracheophytes
- Clade: Angiosperms
- Clade: Monocots
- Order: Alismatales
- Family: Potamogetonaceae
- Genus: Potamogeton
- Species: P. perfoliatus

Binomial name
- Potamogeton perfoliatus L.

Synonyms
- Buccaferrea amplexicaulis (Kar.) Bubani; Peltopsis perfoliata (L.) Raf.; Potamogeton alatofructus A.Benn.; Potamogeton amplexicaulis Kar.; Potamogeton bupleuroides Fernald; Potamogeton loeselii Honck.; Potamogeton praelongus F.Muell.; Spirillus perfoliatus (L.) Nieuwl.

= Potamogeton perfoliatus =

Species of aquatic plant

Potamogeton perfoliatus (claspingleaf pondweed, perfoliate pondweed, redhead grass) is a perennial aquatic plant in the family Potamogetonaceae occurring in both standing and flowing freshwater habitats. It is widely distributed globally, occurring in all continents except South America and Antarctica.

== Description ==
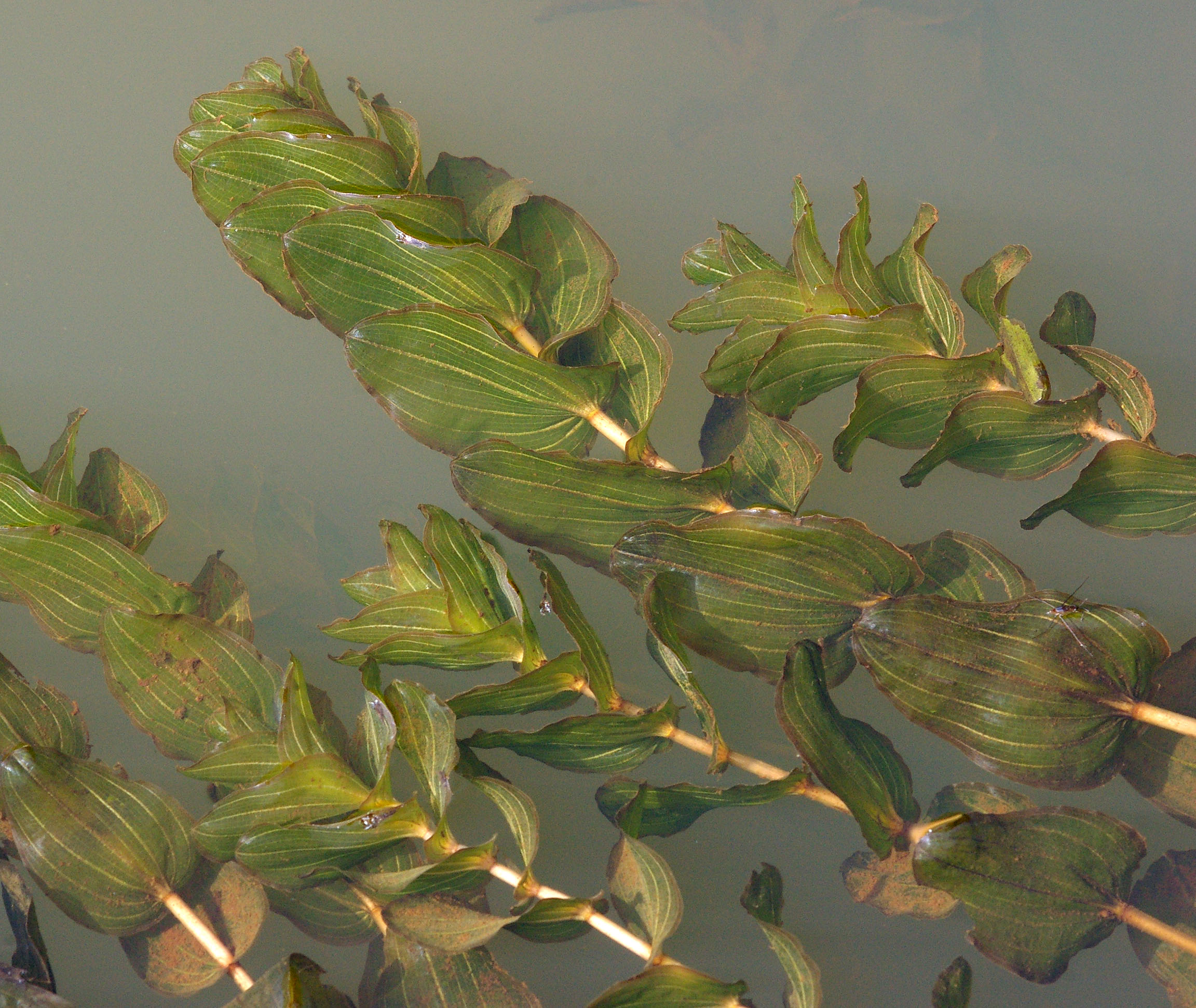
Perfoliate pondweed growing in a canal. Note the leaves clasping the stem.

Perfoliate pondweed grows from a robust creeping perennial rhizome, intermittently producing round stems up to 3 m long. The submerged leaves are oval and translucent, with no stalk, 20–115 mm long and 7–42 mm wide, clasping the stem (perfoliate), a flat apex, and 5–12 veins on either side of the midrib. They vary considerably in colour and may be bright green, dark green, yellowish, olive or brownish. There are no floating leaves. The stipules are rather delicate and usually fall off quite soon after the new leaf has unfurled. The insignificant flowers are produced between June and September. Fruits are 4 mm across, olive green in colour.

Two subspecies have been described. Subspecies perfoliatus occurs in the Old World. In North America, populations on the eastern seaboard and the Gulf States are considered to be subsp. bupleuroides. Since many pondweeds, including P. perfoliatus, vary naturally in response to growing conditions, it is possible that these variants are ecotypes rather than genuine subspecies. The related P. richardsonii was formerly considered a subspecies of P. perfoliatus, but is now classed as a separate species.

Like most other broadleaved pondweeds, perfoliate pondweed is tetraploid, with 2n=52.

Over much of its range, perfoliate pondweed is unlikely to be confused with any other pondweed species except perhaps P. praelongus. In North America it could be confused with P. richardsonii, but the latter has stipules that disintegrate to persistent fibres even on the lower part of the stem, whereas those of P. perfoliatus disintegrate entirely.

However, perfoliate pondweed regularly hybridises with other Potamogeton species including P. crispus (P. × cooperi (Fryer) Fryer), P. gramineus (P. × nitens Weber), P. lucens (P. × salicifolius Wolfg.), P. alpinus (P. × prussicus Hagstr.), P. berchtoldii (P. × mysticus Morong), P. wrightii (P. × anguillanus Koidz.), P. maackianus (P. × leptocephalus Koidz.), P. alpinus (P. × prussicus Hagstr.), P. nodosus (P. × assidens Z. Kaplan, Zalewska-Gałosz et M. Ronikier), P. richardsonii (P. × absconditus Z. Kaplan, Fehrer & Hellq.), P. epihydrus (P. × versicolor Z. Kaplan, Hellq. and Fehrer) and P. praelongus (P. × cognatus Asch. & Graebn.). The first three of these are quite common. A triple hybrid, P. gramineus × lucens × perfoliatus (P. × torssandrii (Tiselius) Dörfler), is also known. Many of these hybrids are perennial and long-lived, sometimes occurring in the absence of one or even both parents. Therefore, care should be taken with identification of unusual specimens.

== Taxonomy ==
Potamogeton perfoliatus (perfoliate meaning that the leaf encircles the stem) was one of the original species named by Linnaeus in Species Plantarum (1753).

DNA analysis indicates that P. perfoliatus is one of the broad-leaved pondweed clade (section Potamogeton) and is probably most closely related to P. richardsonii.

== Distribution ==
Potamogeton perfoliatus has a broad global distribution, occurring in all continents except South America and Antarctica. It has been recorded from Asia (Afghanistan, India, Indonesia (Sumatra), Japan, Kazakhstan, Korea, Kyrgyzstan, Mongolia, Pakistan, Russia, Tajikistan, Uzbekistan), Australia, North America (Eastern and SE US), Europe south to Spain, Central Italy and the Balkans and including Scandinavia, Britain, Ireland and Iceland, North Africa (Algeria, Tunisia, Egypt), the Near and Middle East. It is widespread in lakes and rivers in the British Isles and Ireland, and is common in much of Eurasia and North America, but has a more scattered distribution towards the southern edge of its range.

== Ecology and conservation ==
P. perfoliatus grows in a wide range of freshwater habitats including lakes, rivers and streams, large ponds, canals and larger drains and ditches. It does not tolerate drying out, and the most robust plants tend to occur in >1 m water depth. Unlike most other broad-leaved pondweeds it is reasonably tolerant of water flow and so can use running waters to a significant extent. It is not especially sensitive to water chemistry provided that the water remains reasonably clear and is not too base-poor, occurring in such diverse habitats as exposed Scottish lochs and lowland fenland rivers. However, at high nutrient concentrations it is vulnerable to shading from phytoplankton and epiphytic algae and filamentous algae. It may also grow in brackish or estuarine habitats, notably in Chesapeake Bay. However, elevated salt concentrations have a negative effect on both growth and flowering.

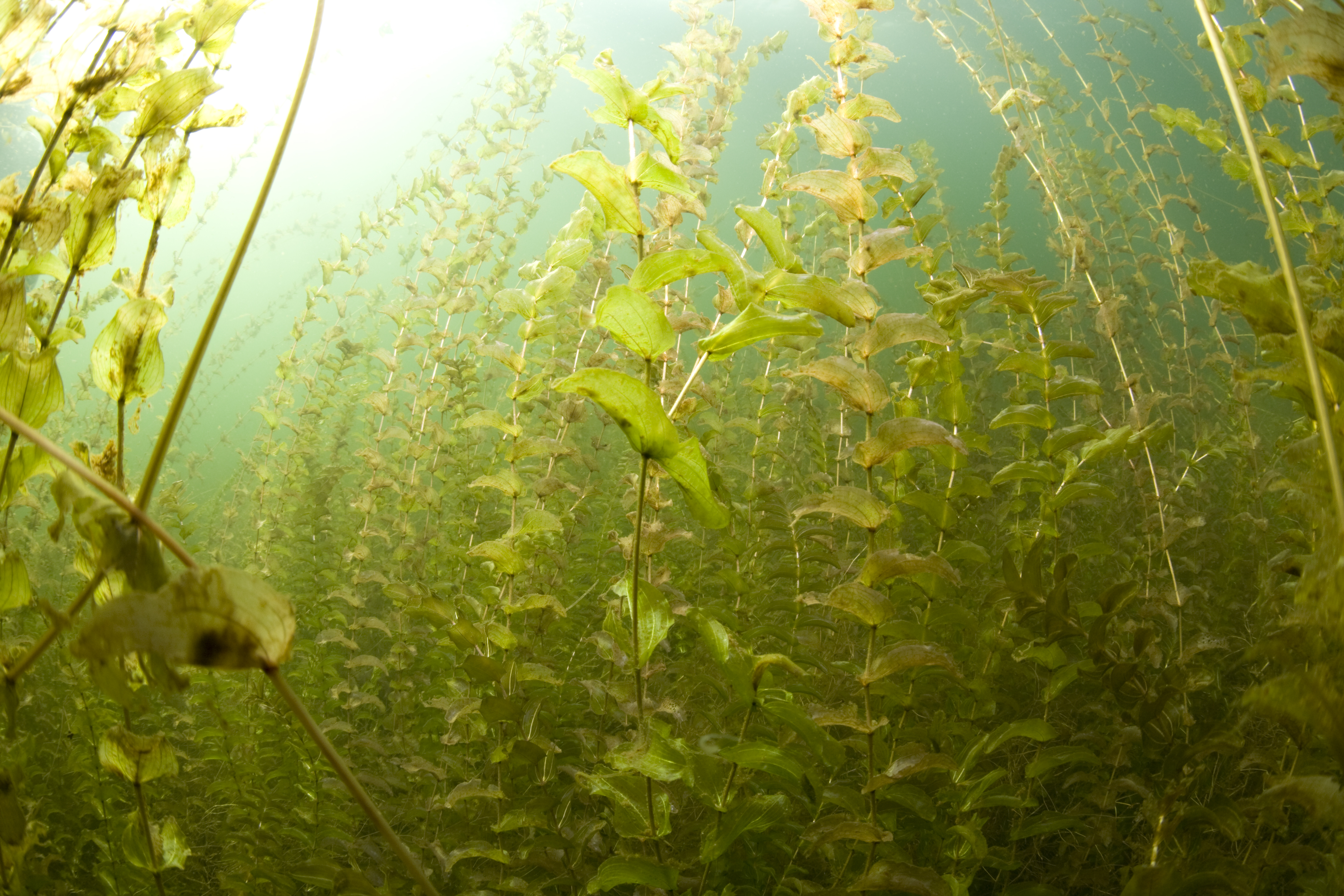
A Potamogeton perfoliatus bed in Llyn Cregennen Isaf, a high quality lake in Wales (UK)

Waterbirds, fish, water beetles and caddis larvae can all be important grazers of perfoliate pondweed, reducing its biomass or even eliminating it locally.

Perfoliate pondweed is less threatened than other broadleaved pondweeds, but it is listed as Vulnerable in Spain and the Netherlands and Endangered in Flanders. There are ongoing efforts to restore populations in Chesapeake Bay, where this was formerly a co-dominant species.

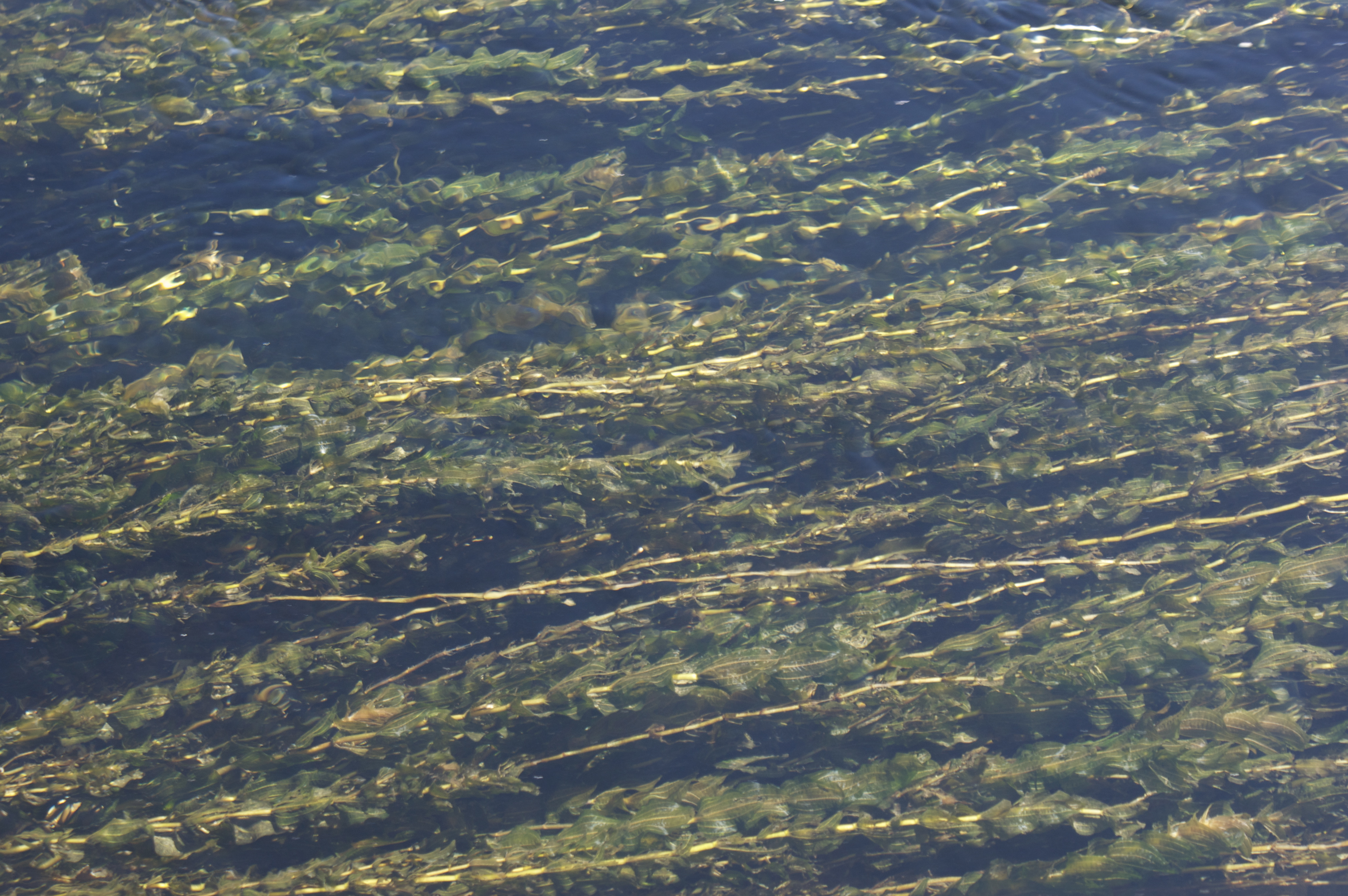
Potamogeton perfoliatus in the River Dordogne, France

Perfoliate pondweed is the commonest of the so-called Magnopotamion group of pondweeds. These are a characteristic floristic component of the protected Habitats Directive habitat Type 'Natural eutrophic lakes with Magnopotamion'.

== Cultivation ==
Perfoliate pondweed is not widely cultivated, which is perhaps surprising as it is not ecologically demanding and is an attractive plant. In common with other pondweeds of this group it roots poorly from stem cuttings and is best propagated by division of the rhizomes. It is easy to grow in a garden pond or even in a barrel, but unlike some other submerged plants needs to be able to root in a suitable substrate such as sand or aquatic compost. Keeping nutrient levels low helps to prevent smothering by algae and more invasive aquatic plants. Plants being established should be weighted down initially to allow them to root, and benefit from being planted among other aquatic plants that can act as a 'nursery'. Transplants have a high survival rate once established.

P. perfoliatus may also be established from seed, which should be sown on a suitable substrate in shallow water. The seed should be left uncovered, or covered only with a minimal amount of substrate to hold the seed in place and allow root development, as seed buried more than 1 cm deep either does not germinate or the seedlings die. The seed typically germinates within about 10 days.

Although it is possible to grow perfoliate pondweed in fish ponds, it would be vulnerable to fish predation initially, so should be protected during establishment.
