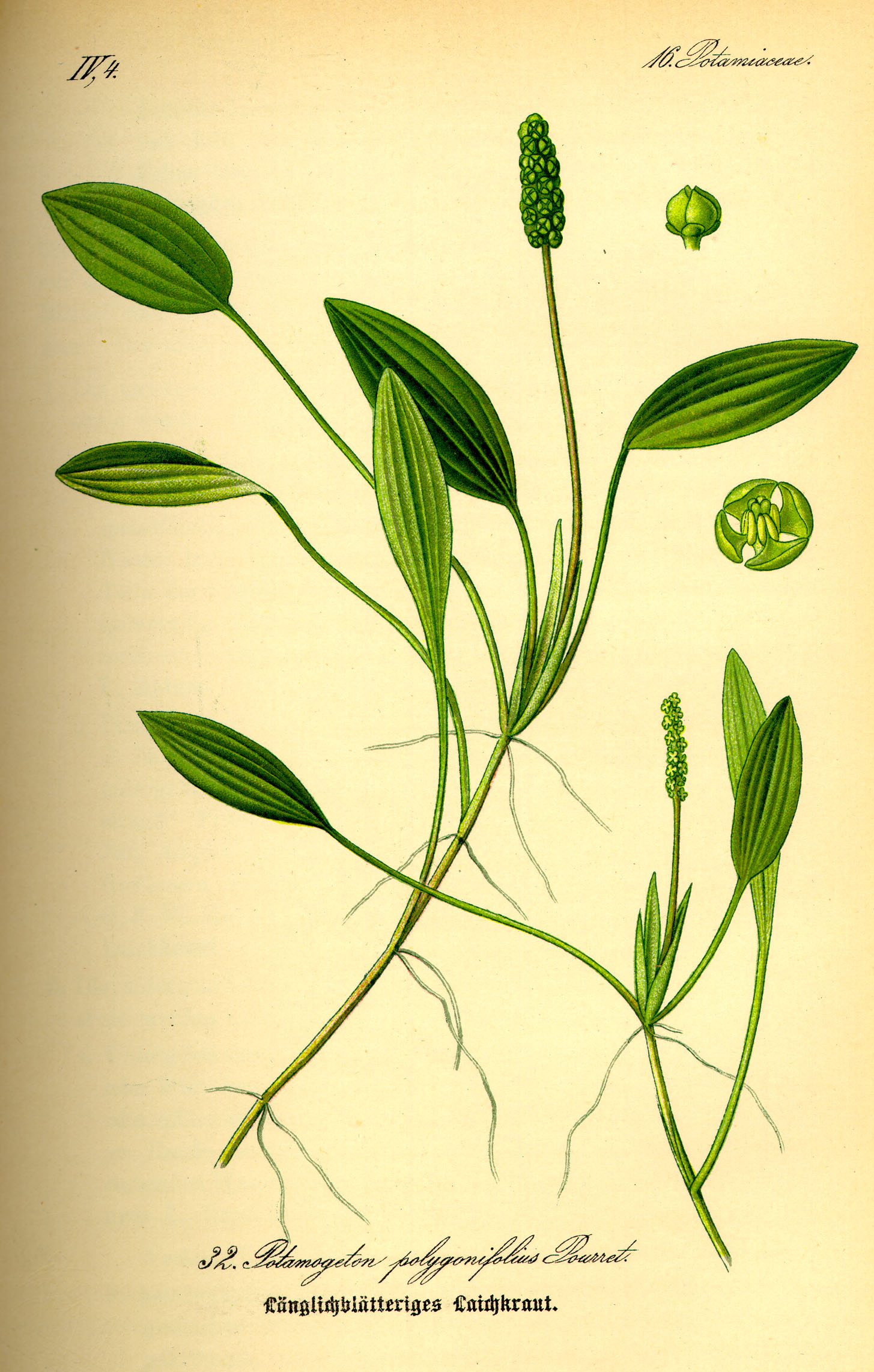

Scientific classification
- Kingdom: Plantae
- Clade: Tracheophytes
- Clade: Angiosperms
- Clade: Monocots
- Order: Alismatales
- Family: Potamogetonaceae
- Genus: Potamogeton
- Species: P. polygonifolius

Binomial name
- Potamogeton polygonifolius Pourr.

= Potamogeton polygonifolius =

Species of aquatic plant

Potamogeton polygonifolius or bog pondweed is an aquatic plant. It is found in shallow, nutrient-poor, usually acid standing or running water, bogs, fens and occasionally ditches.

== Description ==
Bog pondweed is a perennial, growing from creeping rhizomes. The stems are up to 0.7 m long, terete and unbranched. The submerged leaves are long (60–160 mm) and fairly narrow (2.5–24 mm), delicate and translucent with long (14–80 mm) petioles, tending to decay rather early in the season, typically once the floating leaves appear. The floating leaves are opaque, 40–105 × 15–70 mm, usually brownish or dark green in colour with a pink tint when young, with inconspicuous secondary veins. There are no turions.

The inflorescences are up to 42 mm long and produce numerous small greenish flowers. The fruits are 1.9–2.6 mm × 1.4–1.9 mm, larger than P. coloratus but smaller than P. natans.

Bog pondweed occurs both as terrestrial plants in seeps and wet moss, and as aquatic forms, and is very variable. Terrestrial forms in particular can be very difficult to identify. It is most likely to be confused with P. natans which it resembles in general habit, but can usually be distinguished by the presence of submerged leaves (these are reduced to strap-like phyllodes in P. natans) and the absence of a discoloured mark at the base of the floating leaves. The submerged leaves of P. alpinus can be similar, but these are sessile. Although a common plant, bog pondweed does not seem to hybridise readily with other pondweeds, though hybrids with P. natans (P. × gessnacensis G.Fisch.), P. gramineus, P. alpinus (P. × spathulatus Schrad. ex W.D.J.Koch & Ziz), P. berchtoldii (P. × rivularis Gillot) and P. pusillus have been recorded.

== Distribution ==
Potamogeton polygonifolius is mainly restricted to western Europe (Britain, Ireland, France, Netherlands, Belgium, Denmark). It is more localised in the rest of its range including Northern Iberia, Germany, mainland Italy, Sicily, southern Scandinavia, the Baltic states, the Balkans and eastern Europe. There are outlying populations in North Africa (Morocco, Algeria), Orkney, Shetland, the Faroes and Newfoundland, and fossils have been found in Russia. The taxonomic status of populations in the Himalayas requires confirmation. A record from China was based on a misidentification of P. distinctus.

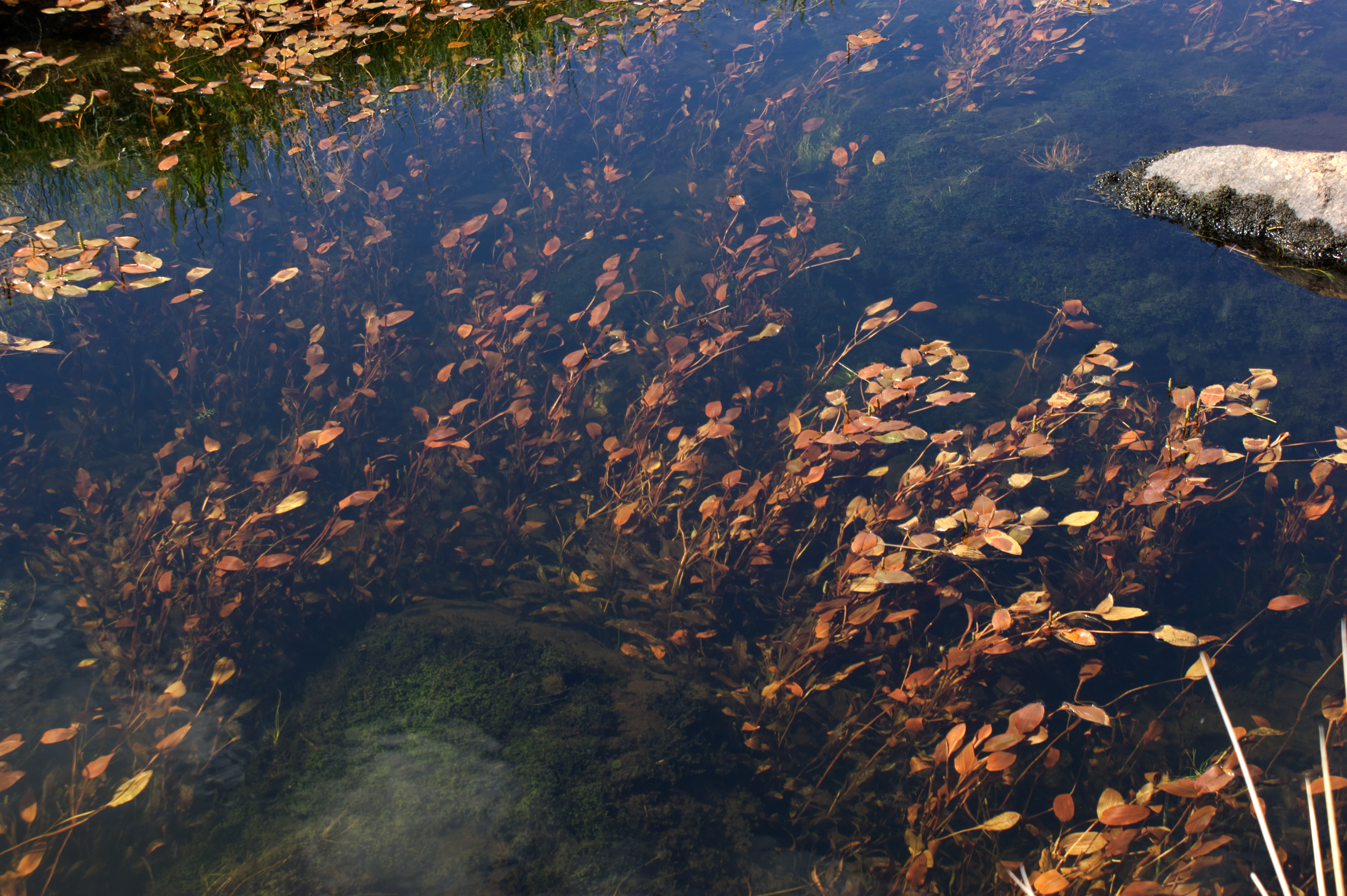
Bog pondweed, Potamogeton polygonifolius, in a lake outflow in North Wales.

== Ecology and conservation ==
In Britain and Ireland, this is one of the commonest pondweeds, occurring in almost any wet or semi-wet oligotrophic and acidic habitat so long as flow is not too rapid. It may be found in lakes, slow-flowing rivers, ponds, ditches, seeps and among bog mosses (Sphagnum). As its name suggests, it is common in areas of blanket bog but may also occur in secondary habitats such as unshaded drainage ditches in bogs and forest plantations. In British rivers it typically grows with other soft-water species such as Ranunculus flammula, Carex nigra, C. rostrata, Scapania undulata and Equisetum fluviatile. In lakes it tends to occur in base-poor, oligotrophic waters with species such as Littorella uniflora, Sphagnum spp., Lobelia dortmanna and Isoetes lacustris especially with a peaty substrate.

Potamogeton polygonifolius is tolerant of acid conditions and therefore has not been affected by the widespread acidification of upland habitats in Britain. However, in very acidified pools in Holland (pH < 5), catchment liming increased the abundance of this and other threatened species. Although it shows a strong preference for soft waters, bog pondweed may also occur in calcareous but low-nutrient habitats. In lowland areas it is more scattered and has declined in southern and eastern England due to nutrient enrichment.

In Central Europe, Potamogeton polygonifolius is threatened, and is considered endangered in Germany, Poland, Switzerland, the Czech Republic. and Luxemburg. However, remaining populations in this area are still strong and reproduce freely. Bog pondweed is also a Red List species in Holland.

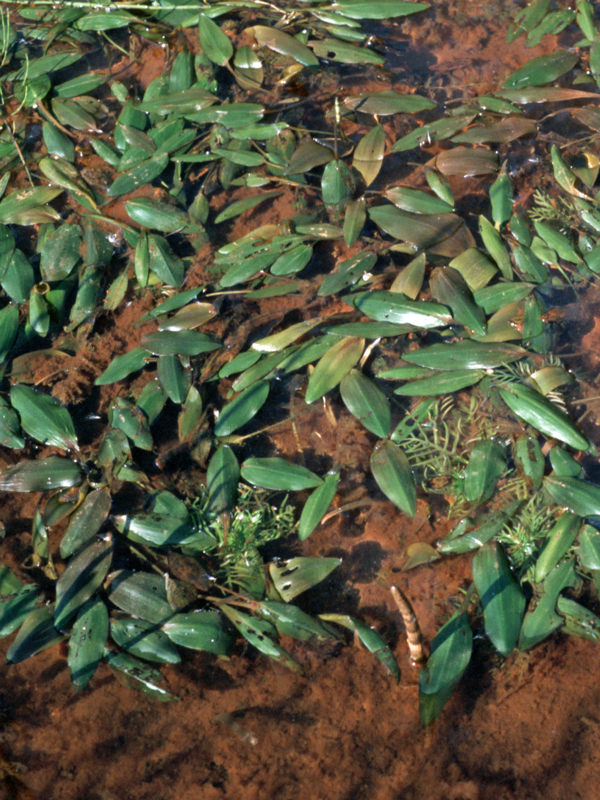

== Cultivation ==
Bog pondweed is not in general cultivation, although it is easy to grow. Its preference for shallow water makes it very suitable for a garden pond, but it would probably be difficult to establish in high nutrient, hard water areas.
