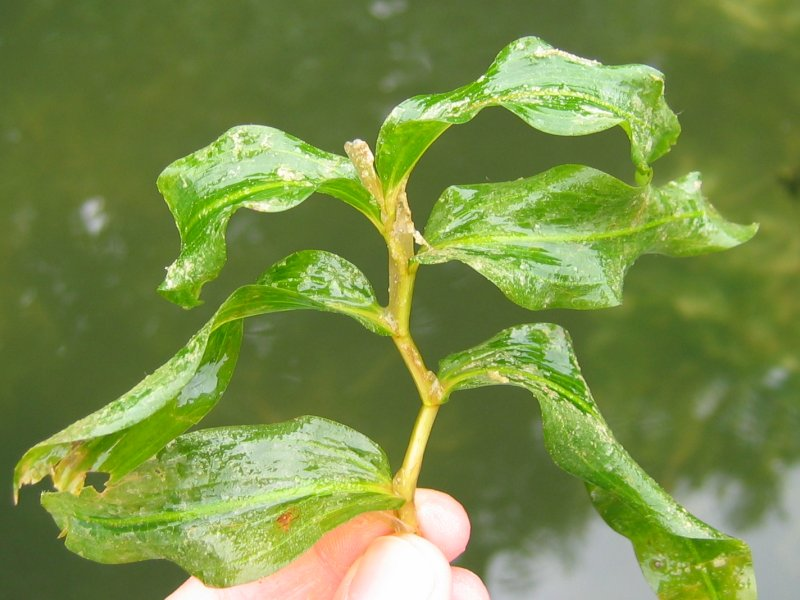

Scientific classification
- Kingdom: Plantae
- Clade: Tracheophytes
- Clade: Angiosperms
- Clade: Monocots
- Order: Alismatales
- Family: Potamogetonaceae
- Genus: Potamogeton
- Species: P. praelongus

Binomial name
- Potamogeton praelongus Wulfen

Synonyms
- Potamogeton acuminatus Wahlenb. Potamogeton flexuosus Wredow Potamogeton flexuosus Schleich. Spirillus praelongus (Wulfen.) Nieuwl.

= Potamogeton praelongus =

Species of flowering plant

Potamogeton praelongus, commonly known as whitestem pondweed in North America and long-stalked pondweed in Britain, is a large, perennial aquatic plant in the family Potamogetonaceae. It is widely distributed in lakes and rivers in the northern hemisphere, but is sensitive to poor water quality.

== Description ==
Long-stalked pondweed has tall stems to 3 m growing from stout, rusty-spotted perennial rhizomes. The stems often change direction between each node, giving a characteristic zig-zagging pattern. The transparent pale to deep green leaves are typically between 60 and 150 mm long but occasionally reach 250 mm and are 14–40 mm wide. The stipules are persistent, open, whitish and translucent, with prominent veins when dry. Floating leaves and turions are absent. The inflorescences are produced quite early for a pondweed, in May–June, and have 15–20 inconspicuous greenish flowers and held on robust peduncles 80–200 mm long. The fruits are large for a pondweed, 4.5–5.5 x 2.5–3.6 mm.

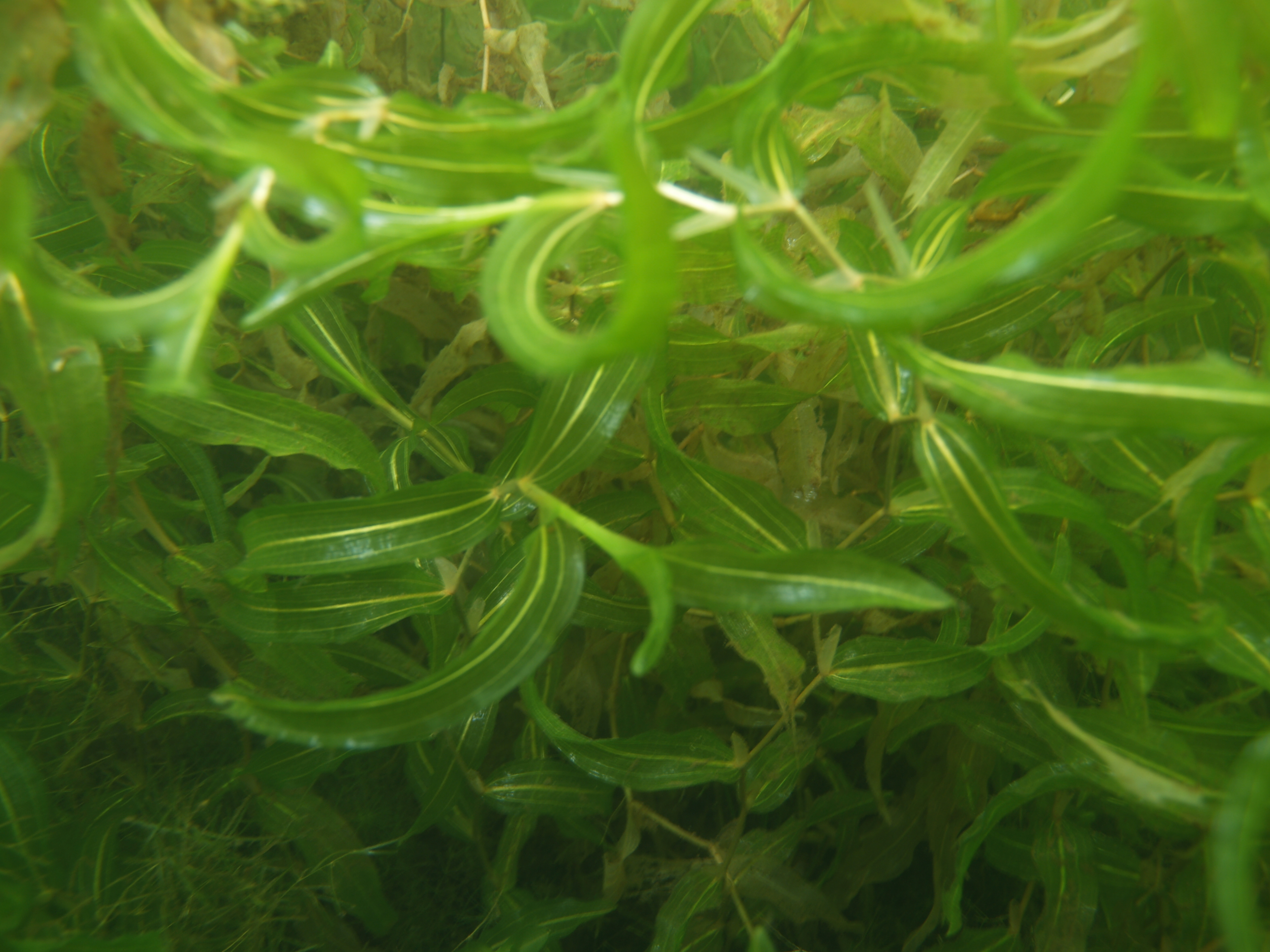
Long-stalked pondweed Potamogeton praelongus growing in deep, very clear water in a lake in North Wales.

Hybrids with several other species, P. alpinus (P. × griffithii A. Benn.), P. crispus (P. × undulatus Wolgf.), P. lucens (P. × jutlandicus Zalewska-Gał.), P. natans (P. × vepsicus A.A. Bobrov & Chemeris) and P. perfoliatus (P. × cognatus Asch. & Graebn.) have been described, but all are rare. Chromosome counts show that, like most other broad-leaved pondweeds, P. praelongus is tetraploid, with 2n=52 chromosomes.

Long-stalked pondweed is relatively easy to identify. It could be confused with narrow-leaved forms of Potamogeton perfoliatus, but the persistent stipules, leaves only partially clasping the stem, larger fruits and (usually) zigzag pattern of the stem are distinctive. Hybrids may be more difficult to identify but usually show various features of the other parent.

== Taxonomy ==
Long-stalked pondweed was first described in 1805 by the German taxonomist Franz von Wulfen. The specific epithet means 'very long'. It is not a particularly variable species and consequently there are few synonyms.

Potamogeton praelongus sits within series Potamogeton, which includes other broad-leaved species such as P. alpinus and P. perfoliatus.

== Distribution ==
Potamogeton praelongus has a Holarctic distribution, occurring in northern Europe (Britain, Ireland, Iceland, Scandinavia, Germany, Switzerland, France, Poland, Russia, the Baltic States), Greenland, Asia (Siberia, China, Korea, Japan), and North America (northern US, Canada). There are outlying populations in the Caucasus, Pyrenees and western USA.

== Ecology ==
=== Ecological requirements ===
P. praelongus requires clear, deep water with at least some basic influence, and rarely grows in water less than 1 m deep. In Britain is usually found in lakes with limestone, marl or basalt geology, and it is absent from acidic lakes such as are common in Wales. It also occurs in slow-flowing rivers and disused canals. Long-stalked pondweed tends to be a rather rare plant within its range; for example, in a study of more than 3,500 British lakes, it occurred in only 88, most of which had low-moderate alkalinity and were dominated by isoetids. The seeds require a cold period to encourage germination.

=== Conservation and threats ===
Long-stalked pondweed is relatively sensitive to eutrophication and declines or local extinctions of this species have been associated with increased nutrient levels. In Loch Leven (Scotland), P. praelongus was lost due to eutrophication during the mid 20th century, but has recently reappeared following improvements to water quality.

Globally, P. praelongus is listed as Least Concern. However, it has undergone a marked decline in parts of its range, especially Europe. In the British Red List for Vascular Plants it is listed as Near Threatened due in particular to a marked decline in southern Britain, likely linked to eutrophication; assessments in England and Wales have recently categorised it as Endangered and Critically Endangered respectively. In Spain, Germany and the Czech Republic P. praelongus is Critically Endangered: the Czechs have an active conservation plan in place to propagate it and introduce it to new locations. It is also listed as Endangered in Switzerland, several US states and some French départements, Vulnerable in the Netherlands, and Extinct in Flanders. Long-stalked pondweed is one of the so-called Magnopotamion group of pondweeds. These are a characteristic floristic component of the protected Habitats Directive habitat Type 'Natural eutrophic lakes with Magnopotamion'. However, in Britain at least, P. praelongus is now predominantly found in oligotrophic to mesotrophic waters.

== Cultivation ==
P. praelongus is not in general cultivation, though it is an attractive plant. Unlike many other pondweeds it remains wintergreen. In common with other pondweeds of this group it roots poorly from stem cuttings and is best propagated by division of the rhizomes. Its preference for relatively deep water and intolerance of turbid conditions may make it unsuitable for many garden ponds. If possible it should be grown in water at least 70 cm deep on a sandy, peaty or silty substrate. Good water quality is needed to reduce the risk of turbid water or growth of blanket weed. Seed can be encouraged to germinate by immersing dried seed in water for at least a month, exposing them to a cold period, or by scarifying them.
