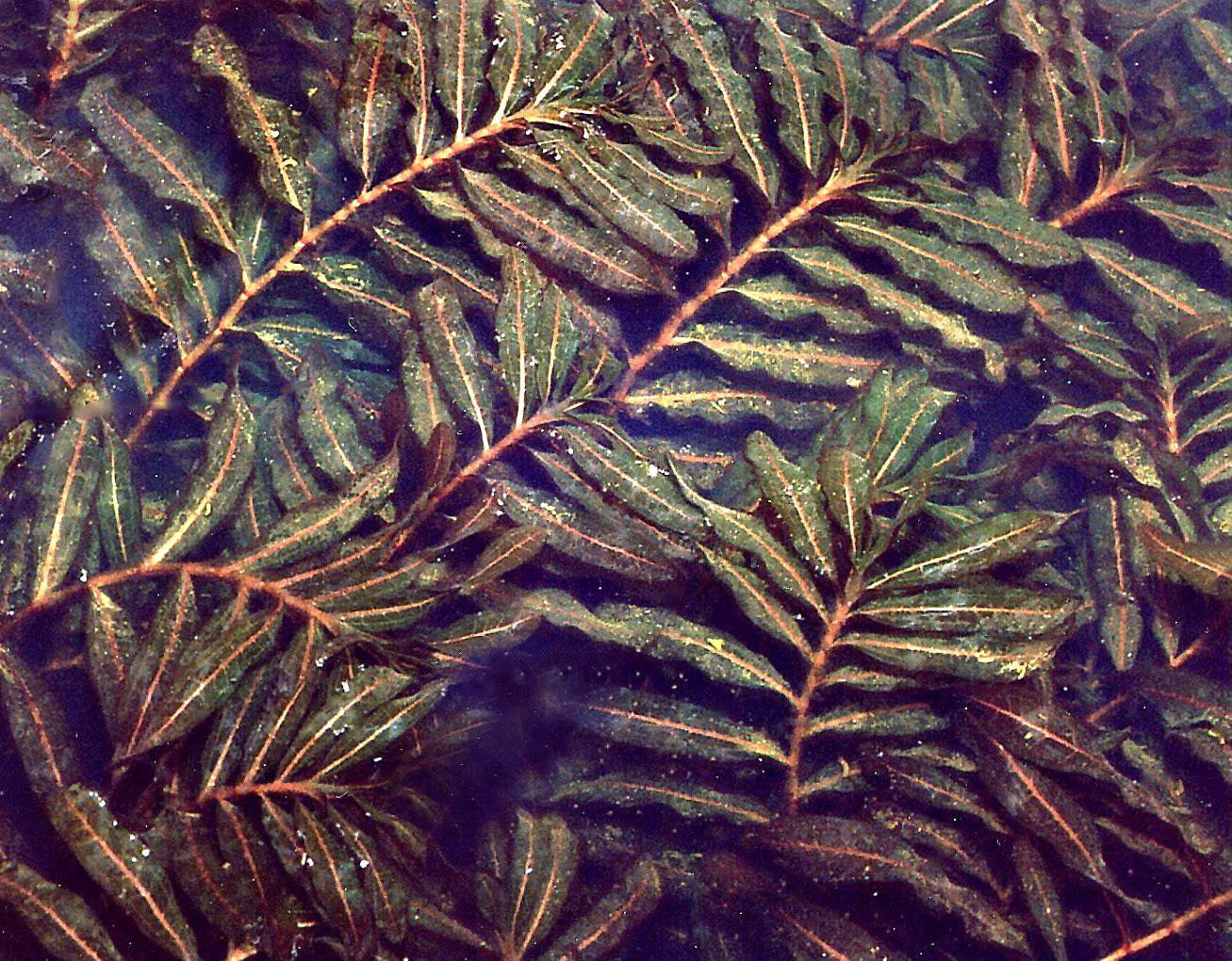

Scientific classification
- Kingdom: Plantae
- Clade: Tracheophytes
- Clade: Angiosperms
- Clade: Monocots
- Order: Alismatales
- Family: Potamogetonaceae
- Genus: Potamogeton
- Species: P. crispus

Binomial name
- Potamogeton crispus (Linnaeus, 1753)

Synonyms
- Buccaferrea crispata Bubani, 1901; Potamogeton austriacus Gand., 1881; Potamogeton concinnitus A.Benn., 1908; Potamogeton crenulatus D.Don, 1825; Potamogeton crispatus Wallm. ex Rchb., 1830; Potamogeton crispus var. gemmifer Rchb., 1845; Potamogeton crispus var. macrorrhynchus (Gand.) Asch. & Graebn., 1897; Potamogeton crispus var. najadoides Graebn., 1907; Potamogeton crispus var. phialiensis Post, 1893; Potamogeton crispus var. serrulatus (Opiz) Schrad. ex Rchb., 1845; Potamogeton hohenackeri Gand., 1881; Potamogeton hungaricus Gand., 1881; Potamogeton lactucaceum Friche-Joset & Montandon, 1856; Potamogeton leptophyllus Gand., 1881; Potamogeton macrorrhynchus Gand., 1881; Potamogeton notarisii Gand., 1881; Potamogeton pallidior Gand., 1881; Potamogeton rubricans Gand., 1881; Potamogeton rubrinaevus Gand., 1881; Potamogeton serrulatus Opiz, 1822; Potamogeton tuberosus Roxb., 1832

= Potamogeton crispus =

Species of aquatic plant

Potamogeton crispus, the crisp-leaved pondweed, curly pondweed, curly-leaf pondweed or curled pondweed, is a species of aquatic plant (hydrophyte) native to Eurasia but an introduced species and often a noxious weed in North America.

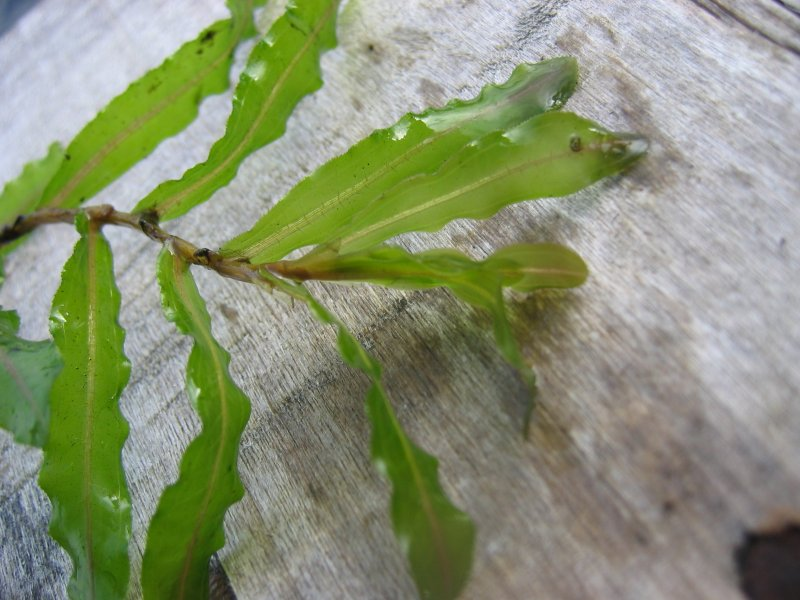

== Description ==
Curly-leaf pondweed is a rhizomatous perennial herb producing a flattened, branching stem up to a meter long. The submerged leaves are alternately arranged. The leaves are sessile, linear or oblong in shape, 25–95 millimetres (1–3 3/4 in) long and 5–12 millimetres (3/16–15/32 in) wide. The leaves may be bright green, olive green or (especially later in the season) fibrous and brownish and have noticeably serrated margins, a feature that distinguishes them from other pondweeds. The leaves usually have wavy edges but this is not always apparent, especially on new growth. Turions occur in leaf axils and at stem tips.

The inflorescence is a short spike of flowers emerging above the water surface. It flowers from May until October.

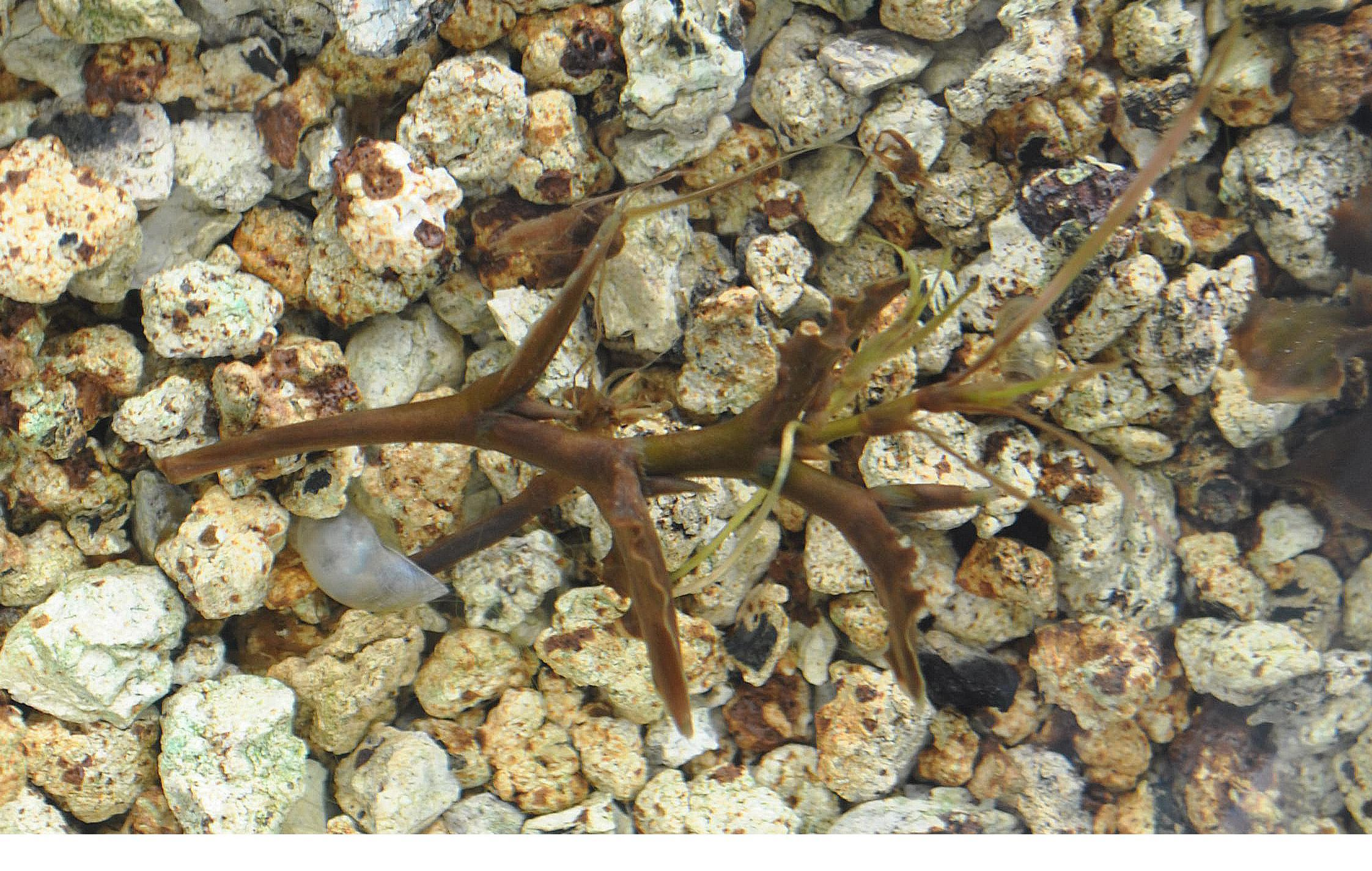

The turions of the plant develop along with the fruits and germinate, leaving the newly sprouted plants to overwinter.

Although quite variable, P. crispus is usually a straightforward plant to identify. Hybrids with various other pondweeds are recorded, but these do not usually closely resemble P. crispus.

There are described hybrids with Potamogeton trichoides (P. × bennettii Fryer), P. perfoliatus (P. × cooperi (Fryer) Fryer), P. alpinus (P. × olivaceus Baagøe ex G.Fisch.), P. lucens (P. × cadburyae Dandy & G.Taylor), P. praelongus (P. × undulatus Wolgf.), P. ochreatus (P. × jacobsii Z.Kaplan, Fehrer & Hellq.) and P. friesii (P. × lintonii Fryer).

== Distribution ==
Potamogeton crispus is native to a wide range of countries in Asia (Afghanistan, Bangladesh, Bhutan, China, India, Indonesia (Sumatra), Japan, Kazakhstan, Korea, Kyrgyzstan, Laos, Mongolia, Myanmar, Nepal, Pakistan, Russia, Tajikistan, Thailand, Turkmenistan, Uzbekistan, Vietnam); Africa, the Middle East, Australia, and Europe. It has been introduced to the Americas and New Zealand.

== Ecology ==
Curly pondweed is widespread and common across most of its native range, growing in standing and slow-flowing water including small ponds and ditches. It is strictly a lowland plant and requires fine substrates in standing or slow-flowing calcareous water. However, it is tolerant of significant nutrient pollution, and this has allowed it to persist in intensively farmed areas where more sensitive pondweeds have declined. Its production of both seed and turions makes it relatively resistant to disturbance such as dredging, in contrast to some of the larger broad-leaved pondweeds, although cutting down to the sediment surface in the early growing season may inhibit turion production.

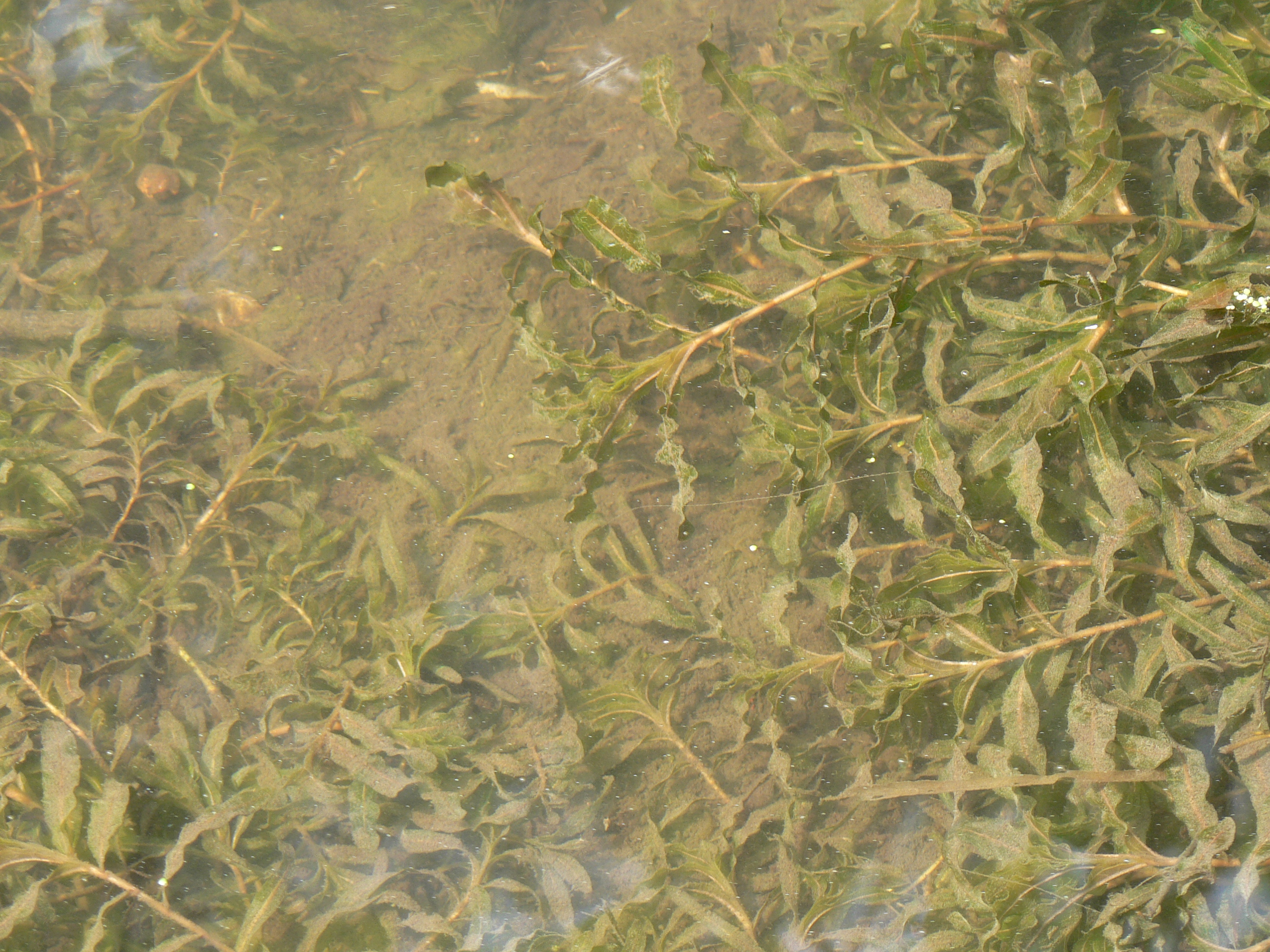
In a silty stream in southern Britain

== Environmental impact ==
This pondweed is considered an invasive species in much of North America. It was introduced to the Great Lakes and inland lakes within that region. The plant thrives in conditions normally less habitable to native plant species. It is also able to survive beneath the surface of frozen waterways and resume its rapid vegetative growth before other water plants can regrow. It competes with native plant life and sometimes displaces it. Curly pondweed may clog waterways, inhibiting aquatic recreation, and is considered a nuisance in some areas. It has also been introduced to South America and New Zealand.

== Cultivation ==
Potamogeton crispus is sometimes cultivated as a pond plant, and generally makes a good garden plant. Since it starts to die back rather early, it is recommended to cut it back in July after it has flowered. In common with other pondweeds of this group it roots poorly from stem cuttings and is best propagated by division of the rhizomes or from turions. As it has proved invasive in some areas, curly pondweed should not be grown outside its native range.
