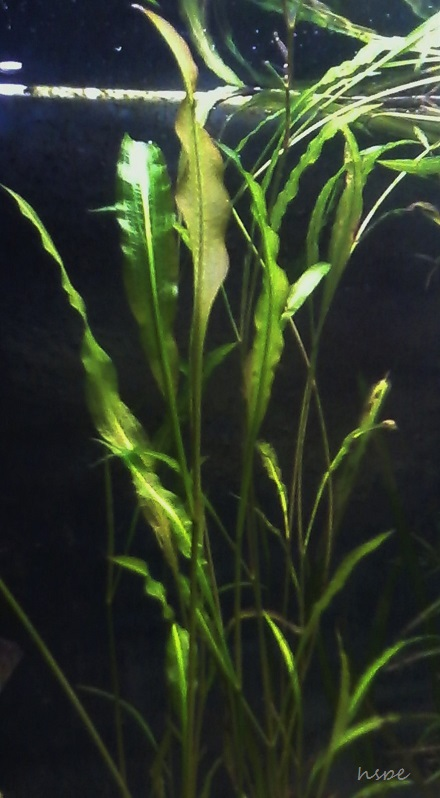
- Potamogeton wrightii

Scientific classification
- Kingdom: Plantae
- Clade: Tracheophytes
- Clade: Angiosperms
- Clade: Monocots
- Order: Alismatales
- Family: Potamogetonaceae
- Genus: Potamogeton
- Species: P. wrightii

Binomial name
- Potamogeton wrightii Morong

= Potamogeton wrightii =

Species of aquatic plant

Potamogeton wrightii, is an aquatic plant species in the genus Potamogeton. It is found in slow-moving fresh water.

== Description ==
The species is fully submerged.

== Ecology ==
This species is known to be hybridized to Potamogeton lucens in Japan and China.
