= Potamogeton maackianus =

Scientific classification
- Kingdom: Plantae
- Clade: Tracheophytes
- Clade: Angiosperms
- Clade: Monocots
- Order: Alismatales
- Family: Potamogetonaceae
- Genus: Potamogeton
- Species: P. maackianus

Binomial name
- Potamogeton maackianus A.Benn.

Species of aquatic plant

Potamogeton maackianus is an aquatic plant species in the genus Potamogeton. It is found in slow moving fresh water.

== Distribution and habitat ==
This is a common plant in lakes and ponds. It is known from Asian fresh waters of Russian Far East, Korea, Japan, China, Taiwan, Indonesia, Philippines, and Myanmar. (India was included in Fl. Malesiana, but the original literature has not found).

== Description ==
Aquatic herb.
