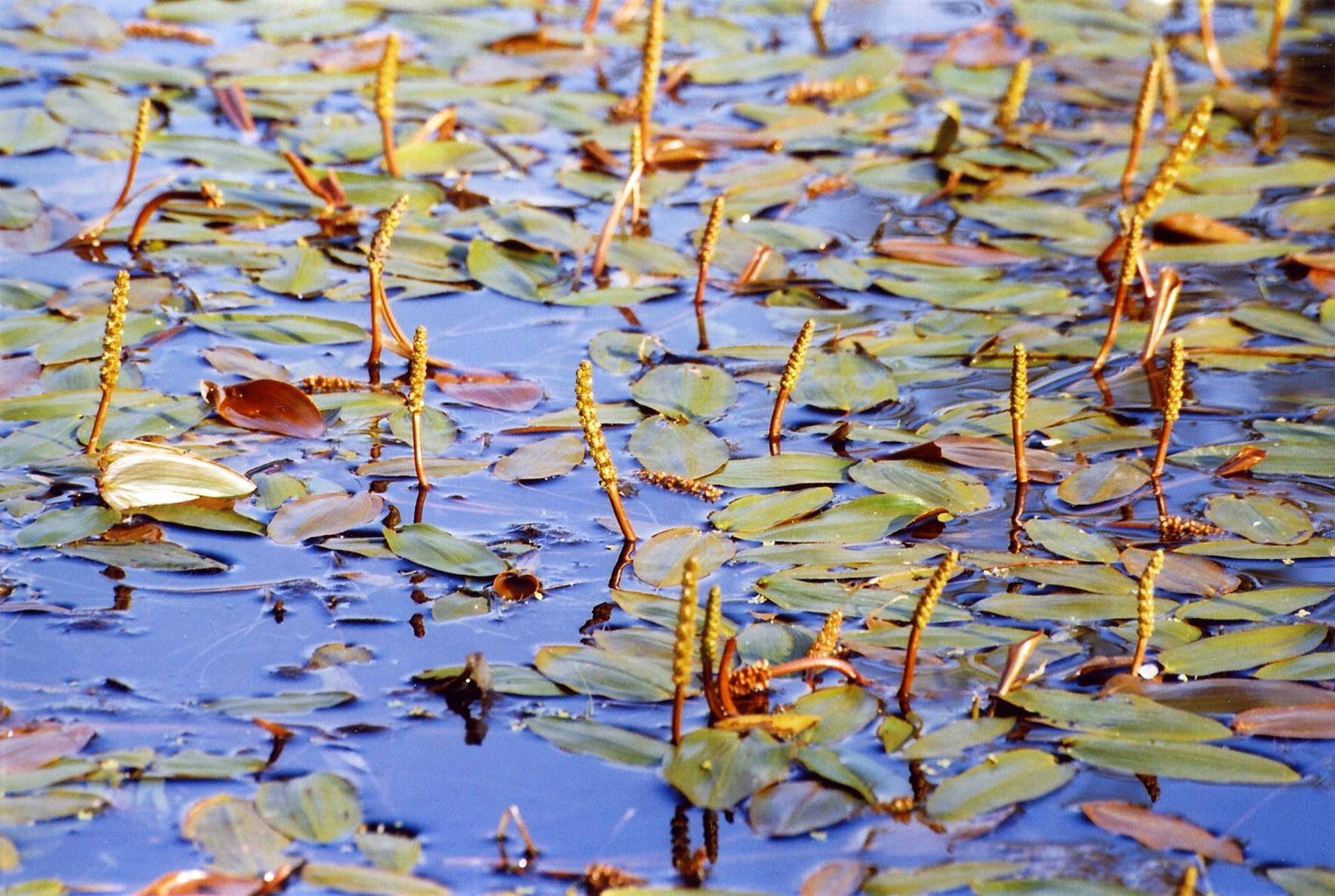

Conservation status
- Least Concern (IUCN 3.1)

Scientific classification
- Kingdom: Plantae
- Clade: Tracheophytes
- Clade: Angiosperms
- Clade: Monocots
- Order: Alismatales
- Family: Potamogetonaceae
- Genus: Potamogeton
- Species: P. natans

Binomial name
- Potamogeton natans L.

= Potamogeton natans =

Species of aquatic plant

Potamogeton natans, commonly known as broad-leaved pondweed, floating pondweed, or floating-leaf pondweed, is an aquatic species in the genus Potamogeton native to quiet or slow-flowing freshwater habitats throughout the Holarctic Kingdom.

== Description ==
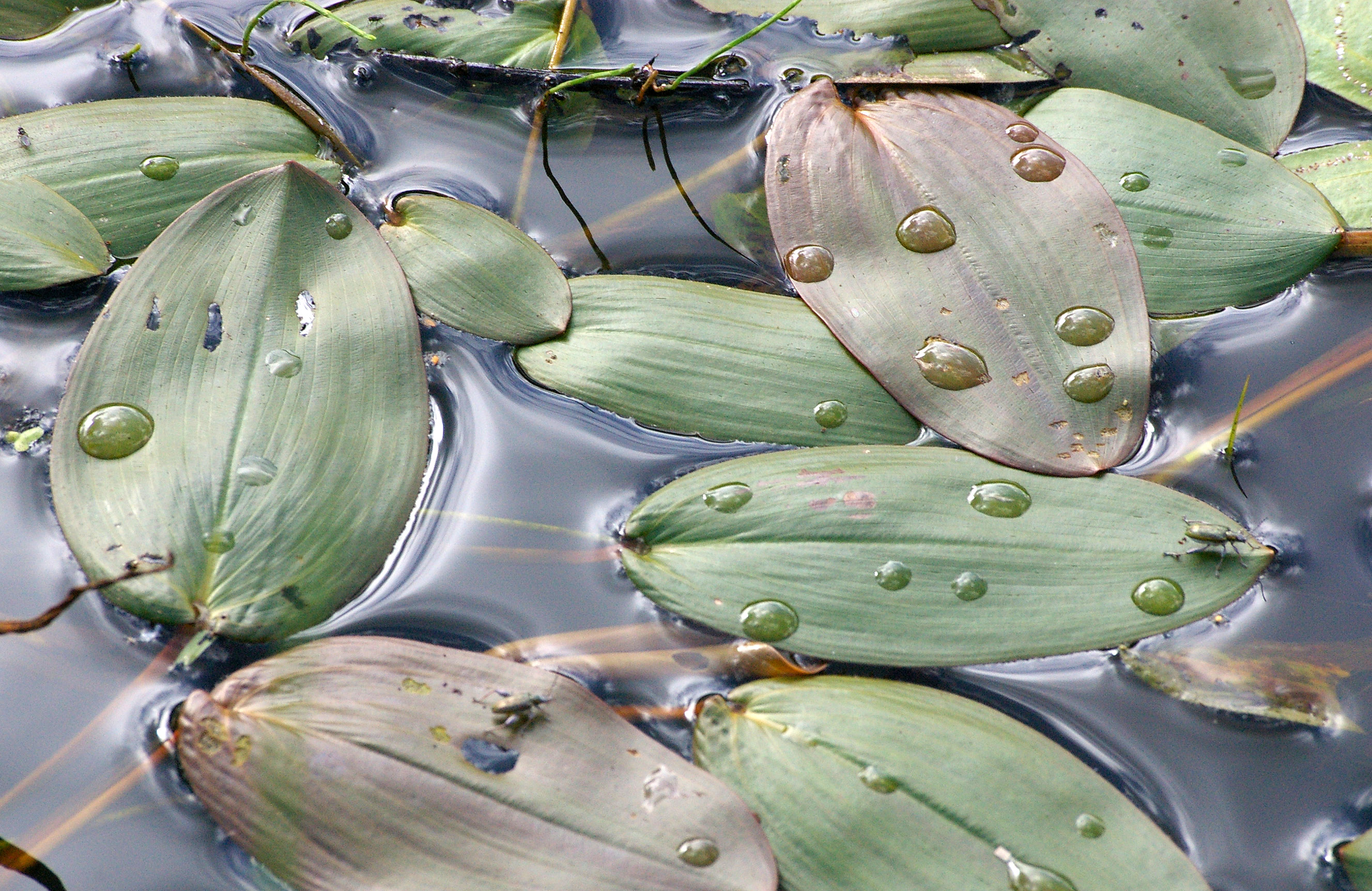
Floating leaves

It produces both floating and submersed leaves on the same plant. The floating leaves are ovate to oblong-ovate and almost always cordate at the base. They are dark green, leathery, opaque, with translucent longitudinal veins. They are 5 to 10 cm long, pointed at the tips, and rounded at the base.

The stipules are 4 to 17 cm long.

The submerged grass-like structures are called phyllodes, are actually modified leaf stalks.

The stems are cylindrical, without many branches, and grow from 1 to 2 metres.

The main difference between this species and other pondweeds is a discoloured flexible joint just below the top of the long leaf stalk.

The flower spikes are dense, and cylindrical. They are 5 to 10 cm long, pointed at the tip and rounded at the base. It flowers from May to September.

The fruits are 4 to 5 mm long and obovate.
