= List of endangered flora of Connecticut =

Flora of Connecticut that are considered endangered species.

Key

- E - Endangered
- T - Threatened
- SC - Special Concern
- SCE - Special Concern, believed extirpated

== Adoxaceae (Moschatel family) ==
- Viburnum nudum (Possum haw, SCE)
- Viburnum prunifolium (Smooth black-haw, T)

== Alismataceae (Water-plaintain family) ==
- Echinodorus tenellus (Bur-head, E) a.k.a. Helanthium tenellum
- Sagittaria cuneata (Northern arrowhead, E)
- Sagittaria subulata (Awl-leaved arrowhead, SC)
- Sagittaria teres (Quill-leaved arrowhead, E)

== Amaranthaceae (Amaranth family) ==
- Amaranthus pumilus (Sea-beach amaranth, SCE, federally threatened)
- Atriplex glabriuscula (Bracted orache, SC)
- Chenopodium rubrum (Red goosefoot, SCE) a.k.a. Oxybasis rubra

== Anacardiaceae (Cashew or sumac family) ==
- Rhus aromatica (Fragrant sumac, SCE, Native populations only)

== Apiaceae a.k.a. Umbelliferae (Celery, carrot or parsley family) ==
- Angelica lucida (Sea-coast angelica, E)
- Angelica venenosa (Hairy angelica, SCE)
- Ligusticum scoticum (Scotch lovage, E)
- Lilaeopsis chinensis (Lilaeopsis, SC)
- Taenidia integerrima (Yellow pimpernel, E)
- Zizia aptera (Golden Alexanders, E)

== Apocynaceae (Dogbane family) ==
- Asclepias purpurascens (Purple milkweed, SC)
- Asclepias variegata (White milkweed, SCE)
- Asclepias viridiflora (Green milkweed) (E)

== Araceae (Arum or aroid family) ==
- Orontium aquaticum (Golden club, SC)

== Araliaceae (Aralia or ivy family) ==
- Hydrocotyle umbellata (Water pennywort, E)
- Hydrocotyle verticillata (Whorled pennywort, E)
- Panax quinquefolius (American ginseng, SC)

== Aristolochiaceae (Birthwort family) ==
- Endodeca serpentaria (Virginia snakeroot, SC a.k.a. Aristolochia serpentaria)

== Aquifoliaceae (Holly family) ==
- Ilex glabra (Inkberry, T, native populations only)

== Asparagaceae ==
- Maianthemum trifolium (Three-leaved false Solomon's-seal, T)

== Aspleniaceae ==
- Asplenium montanum (Mountain spleenwort, SC)
- Asplenium ruta-muraria (Wallrue spleenwort, T)
- Diplazium pycnocarpon (Narrow-leaved glade fern, E)

== Asteraceae (Aster, daisy, composite, or sunflower family) ==
- Ageratina aromatica (Small white snakeroot, E)
- Antennaria howellii ssp. petaloidea (Field pussytoes, SCE)
- Bidens beckii (Beck's water-marigold, SC)
- Bidens eatonii (Eaton's beggarticks, E)
- Cirsium horridulum (Yellow thistle, E)
- Doellingeria infirma (Appalachian white-aster, SCE)
- Eupatorium album (White thoroughwort, E)
- Eurybia radula (Rough aster, E)
- Eurybia spectabilis (Showy aster, T)
- Gamochaeta purpurea (Purple cudweed, SCE)
- Krigia biflora (Two-flowered cynthia, T)
- Liatris novae-angliae (New England blazing-star, SC)
- Oclemena nemoralis (Bog aster, E)
- Oligoneuron album (Prairie goldenrod, a.k.a. Solidago ptarmicoides, E)
- Oligoneuron rigidum (Stiff goldenrod, a.k.a. Solidago rigida, E)
- Packera anonyma (Small's ragwort, E)
- Packera paupercula (Balsam groundsel, E)
- Petasites frigidus var. palmatus (Sweet coltsfoot, T)
- Pityopsis falcata (Sickle-leaved golden aster, E)
- Polymnia canadensis (Small-flowered leafcup, E)
- Senecio suaveolens (Sweet-scented Indian-plantain, E)
- Solidago aestivalis (Early wrinkle-leaved goldenrod, SCE, also called rugosa)
- Solidago latissimifolia (Elliott's goldenrod, SCE)
- Symphyotrichum prenanthoides (Crooked-stem aster, SCE)

== Betulaceae (Birch family) ==
- Betula pumila (Swamp birch, T)

== Boraginaceae (Borage or forget-me-not family) ==
- Cynoglossum virginianum (Wild comfrey, SC)
- Hydrophyllum virginianum (Virginia waterleaf, SC)
- Onosmodium virginianum (Gravel-weed E, a.k.a. Lithospermum virginianum)

== Brassicaceae (Mustards, crucifers, or cabbage family) ==
- Cardamine douglassii (Purple cress, SC)
- Draba reptans (Whitlow-grass, SC)

== Cactaceae (Cactus family) ==
- Opuntia humifusa (Eastern prickly pear, SC)

== Caprifoliaceae (Honeysuckle family) ==
- Linnaea borealis ssp. americana (Twinflower, E)
- Triosteum angustifolium (Narrow-leaved horse gentian, E)
- Valerianella radiata (Beaked corn-salad, SCE)

== Caryophyllaceae (Pink or carnation family) ==
- Honckenya peploides (Seabeach sandwort, SC)
- Minuartia glabra (Mountain sandwort, E)
- Moehringia macrophylla (Large-leaved sandwort, E)
- Paronychia fastigiata (Hairy forked chickweed, SCE)
- Silene stellata (Starry campion, T)
- Spergularia canadensis (Canada sand-spurry, T)
- Stellaria borealis (Northern stitchwort, SC)

== Celastraceae (Staff vine or bittersweet family) ==
- Celastrus scandens (American bittersweet, SC)

== Cistaceae (Rock rose or Rock-rose family) ==
- Crocanthemum dumosum (Bushy frostweed, SCE a.k.a. Helianthemum dumosum)
- Crocanthemum propinquum (Low frostweed, SC a.k.a. Helianthemum propinquum)
- Hudsonia ericoides (Golden heather, E)
- Hudsonia tomentosa (Woolly beach-heather, T)
- Lechea racemulosa (Illinois pinweed, SCE)

== Cleomaceae ==
- Polanisia dodecandra (Clammy-weed, SCE)

== Colchicaceae ==
- Uvularia grandiflora (Large-flowered bellwort, E)

== Convolvulaceae (Bindweed or morning glory family) ==
- Calystegia silvatica (Short-stalked false bindweed, SCE)
- Calystegia spithamaea (Low bindweed, SCE)
- Cuscuta coryli (Hazel dodder, SCE)

== Crassulaceae (Stonecrop or orpine family) ==
- Crassula aquatica (Pygmyweed, E)

== Cupressaceae (Cypress family) ==
- Thuja occidentalis (Northern white cedar, native populations only, T)

== Cyperaceae (Sedge family) ==
- Bolboschoenus maritimus ssp. paludosus (Bayonet Grass, SC)
- Bolboschoenus novae-angliae (Salt marsh bulrush, SC)
- Carex aestivalis (Summer sedge, SC)
- Carex alata (Broadwing sedge, E)
- Carex alopecoidea (Foxtail sedge T)
- Carex aquatilis ssp. altior (Water sedge, SC)
- Carex backii (Back's sedge, E)
- Carex barrattii (Barratt's sedge, E)
- Carex bushii (Bush's sedge, SC)
- Carex buxbaumii (Brown bog sedge, E)
- Carex castanea (Chestnut-colored sedge, E)
- Carex collinsii (Collins' sedge, SCE)
- Carex crawei (Crawe's sedge, T)
- Carex crawfordii (Crawford sedge, SCE)
- Carex cumulata (Clustered Sedge, T)
- Carex davisii (Davis' sedge, T)
- Carex foenea (Bronze sedge, SC a.k.a. Carex siccata)
- Carex formosa (Handsome sedge, T)
- Carex hitchcockiana (Hitchcock's sedge, SC)
- Carex limosa (Mud sedge, T)
- Carex magellanica (Boreal bog sedge, E)
- Carex molesta (Troublesome sedge, SC)
- Carex nigromarginata (Black-edge sedge, SCE)
- Carex novae-angliae (New England sedge, SC)
- Carex oligocarpa (Eastern few-fruit sedge, SC)
- Carex oligosperma (Few-seeded sedge, SCE)
- Carex pauciflora (Few-flowered sedge, SCE)
- Carex polymorpha (Variable sedge, E)
- Carex prairea (Prairie sedge, SC)
- Carex pseudocyperus (Cyperus-like sedge, E)
- Carex reznicekii (Reznicek's sedge, E)
- Carex schweinitzii (Schweinitz's sedge, E)
- Carex siccata (Bronze sedge, SC)
- Carex sterilis (Dioecious sedge, SC)
- Carex trichocarpa (Hairy-fruited sedge, SC)
- Carex tuckermanii (Tuckerman's sedge, SC)
- Carex typhina (Cattail sedge, SC)
- Carex viridula (Little green sedge, E)
- Carex willdenowii (Willdenow's sedge, E)
- Eleocharis equisetoides (Horsetail spikesedge, E)
- Eleocharis microcarpa var. filiculmis (Small-fruited spikesedge, SCE)
- Eleocharis quadrangulata var. crassior (Square-stemmed spikesedge, E)
- Eriophorum vaginatum var. spissum (Hare's tail, T)
- Lipocarpha micrantha (Dwarf bulrush, T)
- Rhynchospora capillacea (Needle beaksedge, E)
- Rhynchospora macrostachya (Tall beaksedge, T)
- Rhynchospora scirpoides (Long-beaked beaksedge, E)
- Schoenoplectus acutus (Hard-stemmed bullrush, T)
- Schoenoplectus torreyi (Torrey bulrush, T)
- Scirpus georgianus (Georgia bulrush, SCE)
- Scirpus longii (Long's bulrush, SCE)
- Scleria pauciflora var. caroliniana (Few-flowered nutrush, E)
- Scleria reticularis (Reticulated nutrush, E)
- Scleria triglomerata (Whip nutrush, E)
- Scleria verticillata (Low nutrush, SCE)
- Trichophorum alpinum (Alpine bulrush, SCE)

== Droseraceae (Sundew family) ==
- Drosera filiformis (Thread-leaf sundew, SCE)

== Dryopteridaceae (Wood fern family) ==
- Dryopteris campyloptera (Mountain wood-fern, E)
- Dryopteris goldieana (Goldie's fern, SC)

== Equisetaceae (Horsetail family) ==
- Equisetum palustre (Marsh horsetail, SCE)
- Equisetum pratense (Meadow horsetail, E)
- Equisetum scirpoides (Dwarf scouring rush, E)

== Ericaceae (Heath or heather family) ==
- Andromeda polifolia var. glaucophylla (Bog rosemary, T)
- Gaultheria hispidula (Creeping snowberry, SC)
- Gaylussacia bigeloviana (Dwarf huckleberry, T)
- Lyonia mariana (Stagger-bush, SCE)
- Moneses uniflora (One-flower wintergreen, E)
- Orthilia secunda (One-sided pyrola, SCE)
- Rhododendron groenlandicum (Labrador tea, T)
- Vaccinium myrtilloides (Velvetleaf blueberry, E,)
- Vaccinium vitis-idaea ssp. minus (Mountain cranberry, SCE)

== Eriocaulaceae (Pipewort family) ==
- Eriocaulon parkeri (Parker's pipewort, E)

== Euphorbiaceae (Spurge family) ==
- Acalypha virginica (Virginia copperleaf, SC)
- Crotonopsis elliptica (Elliptical rushfoil, SCE)

== Fabaceae (Legume, pea, or bean family) ==
- Desmodium cuspidatum (Large-bracted tick-trefoil, E)
- Desmodium glabellum (Dillenius’ tick-trefoil, SC)
- Desmodium sessilifolium (Sessile-leaf tick-trefoil, SCE)
- Lespedeza repens (Creeping bush-clover, SC)
- Phaseolus polystachios var. polystachios (Wild kidney bean, SCE)
- Senna hebecarpa (Wild senna, T)

== Fagaceae ==
- Quercus macrocarpa (Bur Oak, SC)

== Gentianaceae ==
- Gentianella quinquefolia (Stiff gentian, E)
- Sabatia dodecandra (Large marsh pink, SCE)
- Sabatia stellaris (Marsh pink, E)

== Geraniaceae ==
- Geranium bicknellii (Bicknell's northern crane's-bill, SCE)

== Grossulariaceae ==
- Ribes glandulosum (Skunk currant, SC)
- Ribes lacustre (Swamp black current, SCE)
- Ribes rotundifolium (Wild current, SC)
- Ribes triste (Swamp red currant, E)

== Haemodoraceae (Bloodwort family) ==
- Lachnanthes caroliniana (Carolina redroot native populations only, E)

== Haloragaceae (Water-milfoil family) ==
- Myriophyllum alterniflorum (Slender water-milfoil, E)
- Myriophyllum pinnatum (Cutleaf water-milfoil, E)
- Myriophyllum sibiricum (Northern water-milfoil, T)

== Hymenophyllaceae (Filmy ferns and bristle ferns) ==
- Trichomanes intricatum (Appalachian gametophyte, SC)

== Hypericaceae ==
- Hypericum adpressum (Creeping St. John's-wort, SCE)
- Hypericum ascyron (Great St. John's-wort, SC)

== Juncaceae (Rush family) ==
- Juncus debilis (Weak rush, SCE)

== Lamiaceae (Mint or deadnettle family) ==
- Agastache nepetoides (Yellow giant hyssop, E)
- Agastache scrophulariifolia (Purple giant hyssop, E)
- Blephilia ciliata (Downy wood-mint, SCE)
- Blephilia hirsuta (Hairy wood-mint, SCE)
- Lycopus amplectens (Clasping-leaved water-horehound, SC)
- Pycnanthemum torreyi (Torrey mountain-mint, E)
- Stachys hispida (Hispid hedge-nettle, T)
- Stachys hyssopifolia (Hyssop-leaf hedge-nettle, E)
- Scutellaria integrifolia (Hyssop skullcap, E)
- Scutellaria parvula var. missouriensis (Small skullcap, E)
- Trichostema brachiatum (False pennyroyal, E)

== Lentibulariaceae (Bladderwort family) ==
- Utricularia resupinata (Resupinate bladderwort, E)

== Liliaceae (Lily family) ==
- Streptopus amplexifolius (White mandarin, T)

== Limnanthaceae ==
- Floerkea proserpinacoides (False mermaid-weed, E)

== Linaceae ==
- Linum intercursum (Sandplain flax, SCE)
- Linum sulcatum (Yellow flax, E)

== Lycopodiaceae ==
- Huperzia appressa (Fir clubmoss, SCE)
- Lycopodiella alopecuroides (Foxtail clubmoss, E)

== Lygodiaceae ==
- Lygodium palmatum (Climbing fern, SCE)

== Lythraceae ==
- Cuphea viscosissima (Blue waxweed, SCE)
- Lythrum alatum (Winged loosestrife, E)
- Rotala ramosior (Toothcup, T)

== Melanthiaceae ==
- Chamaelirium luteum (Devil's bit, E)
- Veratrum latifolium (Hybrid bunchflower, SCE)

== Nymphaeaceae (Water-lily family) ==
- Nuphar advena (Large yellow pond lily, SCE)
- Nuphar microphylla (Small yellow pond lily, SCE)

== Onagraceae (Primrose or willowherb family) ==
- Ludwigia polycarpa (Many-fruited false-loosestrife, SCE)
- Ludwigia sphaerocarpa (Globe-fruited false-loosestrife, E)
- Oenothera fruticosa (Sundrops, SCE)

== Orchidaceae (Orchid family) ==
- Aplectrum hyemale (Puttyroot, SCE)
- Arethusa bulbosa (Dragon's-mouth, SCE)
- Coeloglossum viride (Long-bracted green orchid, E)
- Corallorhiza trifida (Early coral root, SC)
- Cypripedium arietinum (Ram's-head lady's-slipper, SCE)
- Cypripedium parviflorum (Yellow lady's-slipper, SC)
- Cypripedium reginae (Showy lady's-slipper, SC)
- Goodyera repens var. ophioides (Dwarf rattlesnake plantain, SCE)
- Isotria medeoloides (Small whorled pogonia, E, federally threatened)
- Liparis liliifolia (Lily-leaved twayblade, E)
- Malaxis bayardii (Bayard's white adder's mouth, SCE)
- Malaxis monophyllos (White adder's-mouth, E)
- Malaxis unifolia (Green adder's-mouth, E)
- Platanthera blephariglottis (White-fringed orchid, E)
- Platanthera ciliaris (Yellow-fringed orchid, E)
- Platanthera dilatata (Tall white bog orchid, SCE)
- Platanthera flava var. herbiola (Pale green orchid, SC)
- Platanthera hookeri (Hooker's orchid, SCE)
- Platanthera orbiculata (Large round-leaved orchid, SCE)
- Triphora trianthophora (Nodding pogonia, E)
- Spiranthes tuberosa var. grayi (Little ladies’-tresses, SC)

== Ophioglossaceae (Adder's-tongue family) ==
- Botrychium simplex (Little grape fern, SCE)
- Ophioglossum pusillum (Northern adder's-tongue, E)
- Ophioglossum vulgatum (Southern adder's-tongue, E)

== Orobanchaceae (Broomrape family) ==
- Agalinis acuta (Sandplain agalinis, E, Federally Endangered)
- Castilleja coccinea (Indian paintbrush, E)
- Pedicularis lanceolata (Swamp lousewort, T)
- Schwalbea americana (Chaffseed, SCE, federally endangered)

== Oxalidaceae (Wood sorrel family) ==
- Oxalis violacea (Violet wood-sorrel, SC)

== Papaveraceae (Poppy family) ==
- Corydalis flavula (Yellow corydalis, T)
- Dicentra canadensis (Squirrel corn, SC)

== Plantaginaceae (Plantain family) ==
- Plantago virginica (Hoary plantain, SC)

== Pinaceae (Pine family) ==
- Abies balsamea (Balsam fir, E, native populations only)
- Pinus resinosa (Red pine, E, native populations only)

== Poaceae (Grasses family) ==
- Alopecurus aequalis (Short-awned meadow-foxtail, T)
- Aristida longespica var. geniculata (Needlegrass, SC)
- Aristida purpurascens (Arrowfeather, E)
- Aristida tuberculosa (Beach needle grass, E)
- Bouteloua curtipendula (Sideoats grama-grass, E)
- Calamagrostis stricta ssp. inexpansa (Bend reedgrass, T)
- Coleataenia longifolia ssp. elongata (SCE)
- Deschampsia cespitosa (Tufted hairgrass, SC)
- Dichanthelium ovale ssp. pseudopubescens (Stiff-leaved rosette-panicgrass, SCE)
- Dichanthelium scabriusculum (Tall swamp rosette-panicgrass, E)
- Dichanthelium sphaerocarpon var. isophyllum (Round-fruited rosette panicgrass, SCE)
- Dichanthelium xanthophysum (Pale-leaved rosette-panicgrass, SCE)
- Leptochloa fusca ssp. fascicularis (Saltpond grass, E)
- Milium effusum (Tall millet-grass, E)
- Muhlenbergia capillaris (Long-awn hairgrass, E)
- Panicum amarum var. amarum (Bitter panicgrass, T)
- Panicum verrucosum (Warty panicgrass, SCE)
- Paspalum laeve (Field paspalum, T)
- Paspalum setaceum var. psammophilum (Thin paspalum, SCE)
- Piptatherum pungens (Slender mountain ricegrass, E)
- Phragmites americanus (American reed, SC)
- Puccinellia pumila (Goose grass, SCE)
- Schizachne purpurascens (Purple oat, SC)
- Sporobolus clandestinus (Rough dropseed, E)
- Sporobolus cryptandrus (Sand dropseed, T)
- Sporobolus heterolepis (Northern dropseed, E)
- Sporobolus neglectus (Small dropseed, E)
- Trisetum spicatum (Narrow false oats, E)

== Polygalaceae (Milkwort family) ==
- Polygala ambigua (Alternate milkwort, SC)
- Polygala cruciata (Field milkwort, E)
- Polygala nuttallii (Nuttall's milkwort, T)
- Polygala senega (Seneca snakeroot, E)

== Polygonaceae (Knotweed, smartweed, or buckwheat family) ==
- Polygonum glaucum (Seabeach knotweed, SC)
- Rumex persicarioides (Sea-side dock, SCE)

== Pontederiaceae ==
- Heteranthera reniformis (Kidneyleaf mud-plantain, SCE)

== Potamogetonaceae (Pondweed family) ==
- Potamogeton confervoides (Tuckerman's pondweed, E)
- Potamogeton friesii (Fries' pondweed, E)
- Potamogeton gemmiparus (Capillary pondweed, T)
- Potamogeton hillii (Hill's pondweed, E)
- Potamogeton ogdenii (Ogden's pondweed, E)
- Potamogeton strictifolius (Straight-leaved pondweed, E)
- Potamogeton vaseyi (Vasey's pondweed, T)

== Primulaceae (Primrose family) ==
- Hottonia inflata (Featherfoil, SC)

== Pteridaceae ==
- Cheilanthes lanosa (Hairy lip-fern, E)
- Cryptogramma stelleri (Slender cliff-brake, E)
- Pellaea glabella (Smooth cliff-brake, E)

== Ranunculaceae (Buttercup or crowfoot family) ==
- Anemone acutiloba (Sharp-lobed hepatica, SC)
- Anemone canadensis (Canada anemone, T)
- Hydrastis canadensis (Goldenseal, E)
- Ranunculus ambigens (Water-plantain spearwort, E)
- Ranunculus cymbalaria (Seaside crowfoot, E)
- Ranunculus flammula var. reptans (Creeping spearwort, SCE)
- Ranunculus pensylvanicus (Bristly buttercup, SC)
- Trollius laxus (Spreading globe flower, T)

== Rosaceae (Rose family) ==
- Drymocallis arguta (Tall cinquefoil, SC)
- Prunus alleghaniensis (Alleghany plum, SCE)
- Prunus maritima var. gravesii (Graves beach plum, SCE)
- Rosa nitida (Shining rose, SCE)
- Rubus cuneifolius (Sand blackberry, SC)
- Rubus dalibarda (Dew-drop, E, Now called Dalibarda repens)
- Sibbaldiopsis tridentata (Three-toothed cinquefoil, T)
- Waldsteinia fragarioides (Barren strawberry, E)

== Rubiaceae, (Coffee, madder, or bedstraw family) ==
- Galium labradoricum (Bog bedstraw, E)
- Houstonia longifolia (Longleaf bluet, T)

== Salicaceae (Willow family) ==
- Populus heterophylla (Swamp cottonwood, T)
- Salix exigua (Sandbar willow, E)
- Salix pedicellaris (Bog willow, E)
- Salix petiolaris (Slender willow, SC)

== Santalaceae (Sandalwood family) ==
- Arceuthobium pusillum (Dwarf mistletoe, E)

== Saururaceae (Lizard tail family) ==
- Saururus cernuus (Lizard's Tail, E)

== Saxifragaceae ==
- Mitella nuda (Naked miterwort, SC)

== Scheuchzeriaceae ==
- Scheuchzeria palustris ssp. Americana (Pod grass, E)

== Scrophulariaceae (Figwort family) ==
- Limosella australis (Mudwort, SC)

== Smilacaceae (Greenbrier family) ==
- Smilax hispida (Bristly greenbriar, SCE)

== Typhaceae ==
- Sparganium fluctuans (Floating bur-reed, E)
- Sparganium natans (Small bur-reed, E)

== Verbenaceae (Verbena or vervain family) ==
- Verbena simplex (Narrow-leaved vervain, SC)

== Violaceae (Violet family) ==
- Hybanthus concolor (Green violet, SCE)
- Viola adunca (Hook-spurred violet, E)
- Viola brittoniana (Coast violet, E)
- Viola canadensis (Canada violet, SC)
- Viola hirsutula (Southern wood violet, SCE)
- Viola nephrophylla (Northern bog violet, SC)
- Viola renifolia (Kidney-leaf white violet, E)
- Viola selkirkii (Great-spurred violet, SC)

== Xyridaceae ==
- Xyris montana (Northern yellow-eyed grass, T)
- Xyris smalliana (Small's yellow-eyed, E)
