= Flora of Connecticut =

Overview of plant species in Connecticut

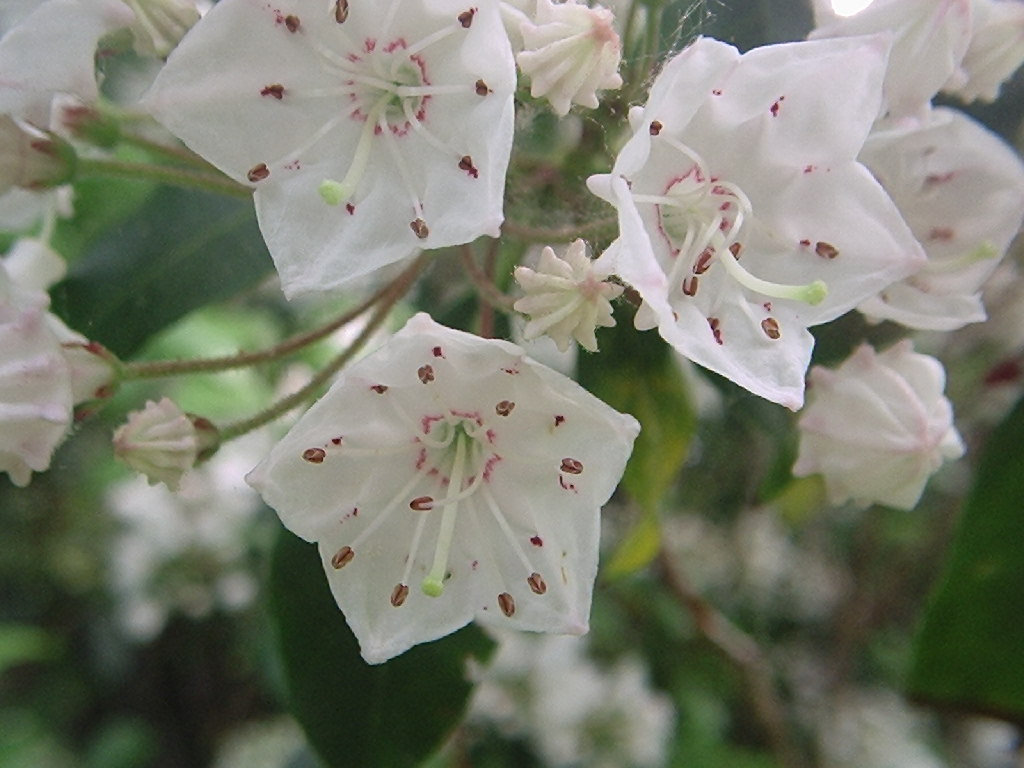
Mountain Laurel flowers.

The flora of Connecticut comprise a variety of plant species. Geobotanically, Connecticut belongs to the North American Atlantic Region.

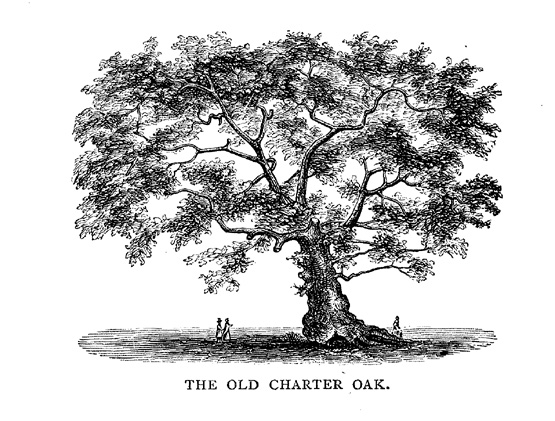
The Charter Oak

- The state tree is the white oak; or more specifically, the Charter Oak.
- The state flower is the mountain laurel.

== Biodiversity ==
A complete census of tree species taken in 1885 in Hartford County listed 56 species of trees.

== List of flora ==
Scientific name	English name	Status
Caltha palustris	Kingcup or marsh marigold	
Cephalanthus occidentalis	Buttonbush, button-bush, button-willow or honey-bells	
Clethra alnifolia	Summersweet or sweet pepperbush	
Iris versicolor	Blue flag iris or harlequin blueflag	
Kalmia latifolia	Mountain laurel	
Quercus alba	White oak	
Ranunculus septentrionalis	Swamp buttercup	
Rhododendron viscosum	Clammy azalea or swamp azalea	
Symplocarpus foetidus	Eastern skunk cabbage	

== Floral regions ==
A large part of the state of Connecticut is covered with oak-hickory type central hardwood forest. This region was historically dominated by various oaks and chestnuts, but hickory replaced chestnut with the spread of the chestnut blight.

In the northwestern hills of the state, more northern-hardwood type trees are present.

== See also ==
- List of endangered flora of Connecticut
- Fauna of Connecticut
- List of mammals in Connecticut
