= Few-fruited sedge =

Few-fruited sedge is a common name for several plants and may refer to:

- Carex oligocarpa, native to North America
- Carex oligosperma
