= C. polymorpha =

C. polymorpha may refer to:

- Callyspongia polymorpha, a demosponge first described in 1984
- Canna polymorpha, a garden plant
- Capparis polymorpha, a climbing shrub
- Carex polymorpha, a true sedge
- Ceratomyxa polymorpha, a myxosporean parasite
- Chlumetia polymorpha, an owlet moth
- Coniochaeta polymorpha, a pleomorphic yeast
- Coprosma polymorpha, a plant found on the South Island
- Crepis polymorpha, a hawk's-beard native to eastern and southern Europe
- Cucurbita polymorpha, a plant used in traditional Native American medicine
- Cunninghamella polymorpha, a pin mold
