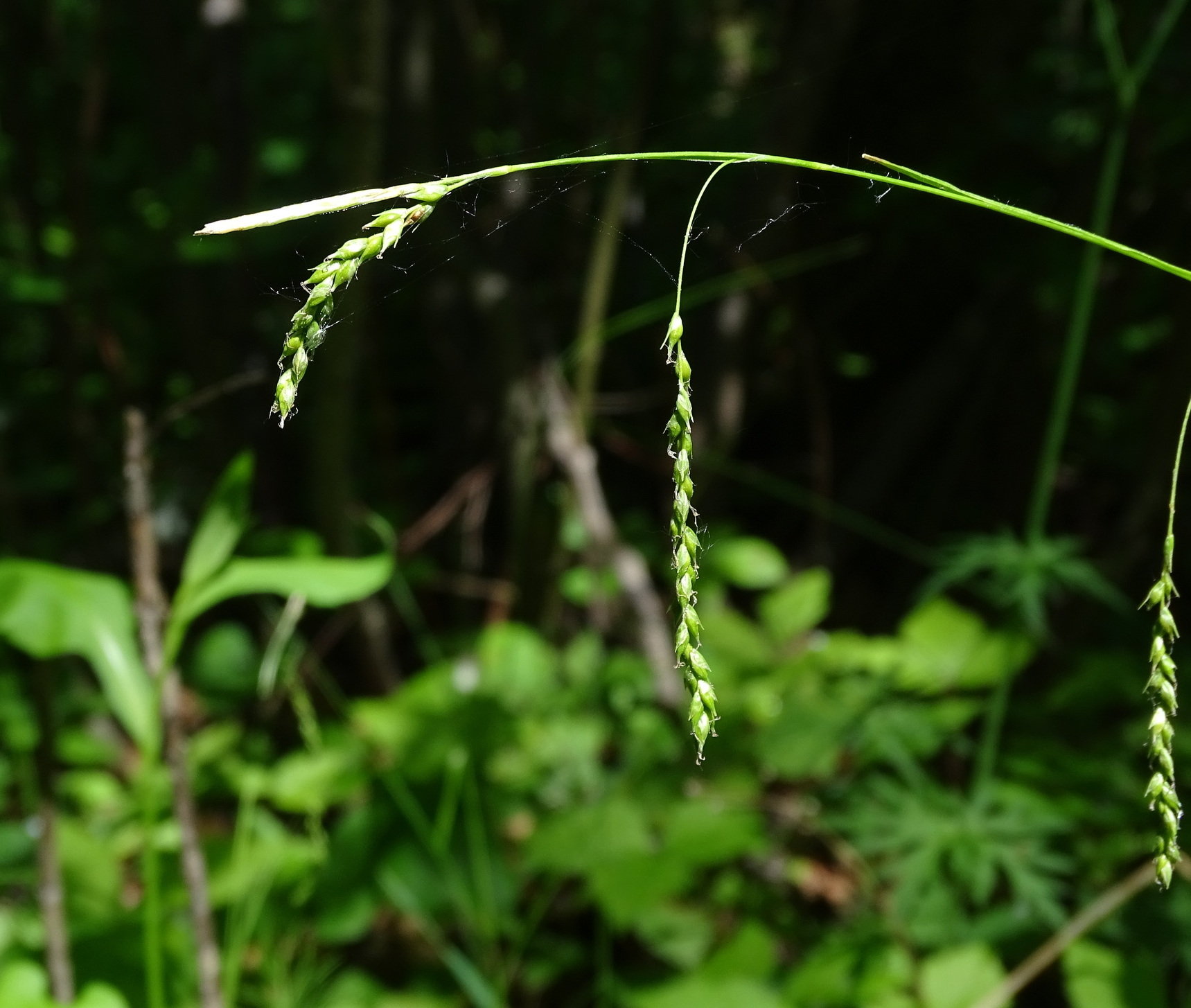
- In Ontario, Canada

Scientific classification
- Kingdom: Plantae
- Clade: Tracheophytes
- Clade: Angiosperms
- Clade: Monocots
- Clade: Commelinids
- Order: Poales
- Family: Cyperaceae
- Genus: Carex
- Section: Carex sect. Hymenochlaenae
- Species: C. arctata

Binomial name
- Carex arctata Boott

Synonyms
- Carex arctata var. faxonii L.H.Bailey; Carex sylvatica Dewey

= Carex arctata =

Species of grass-like plant

Carex arctata, known as drooping woodland sedge, is a species of sedge native to eastern North America. It is sometimes called black sedge, compressed sedge, or drooping wood sedge. It occurs from Manitoba to the Maritimes in Canada, south to northwestern North Carolina, and west to Minnesota. Carex arctata grows in bogs, hardwood forests, and spruce forests.

== Taxonomy ==
Carex arctata part of the section Carex sect. Hymenochlaenae. It was first formally named by Francis Boott in 1839.

Carex arctata and Carex castanea (chestnut sedge, also in C. sect. Hymenochlaenae) form a hybrid known as Carex × knieskernii (Knieskern's sedge).

== Conservation ==
It is endangered in several states: Indiana, Ohio, and New Jersey.

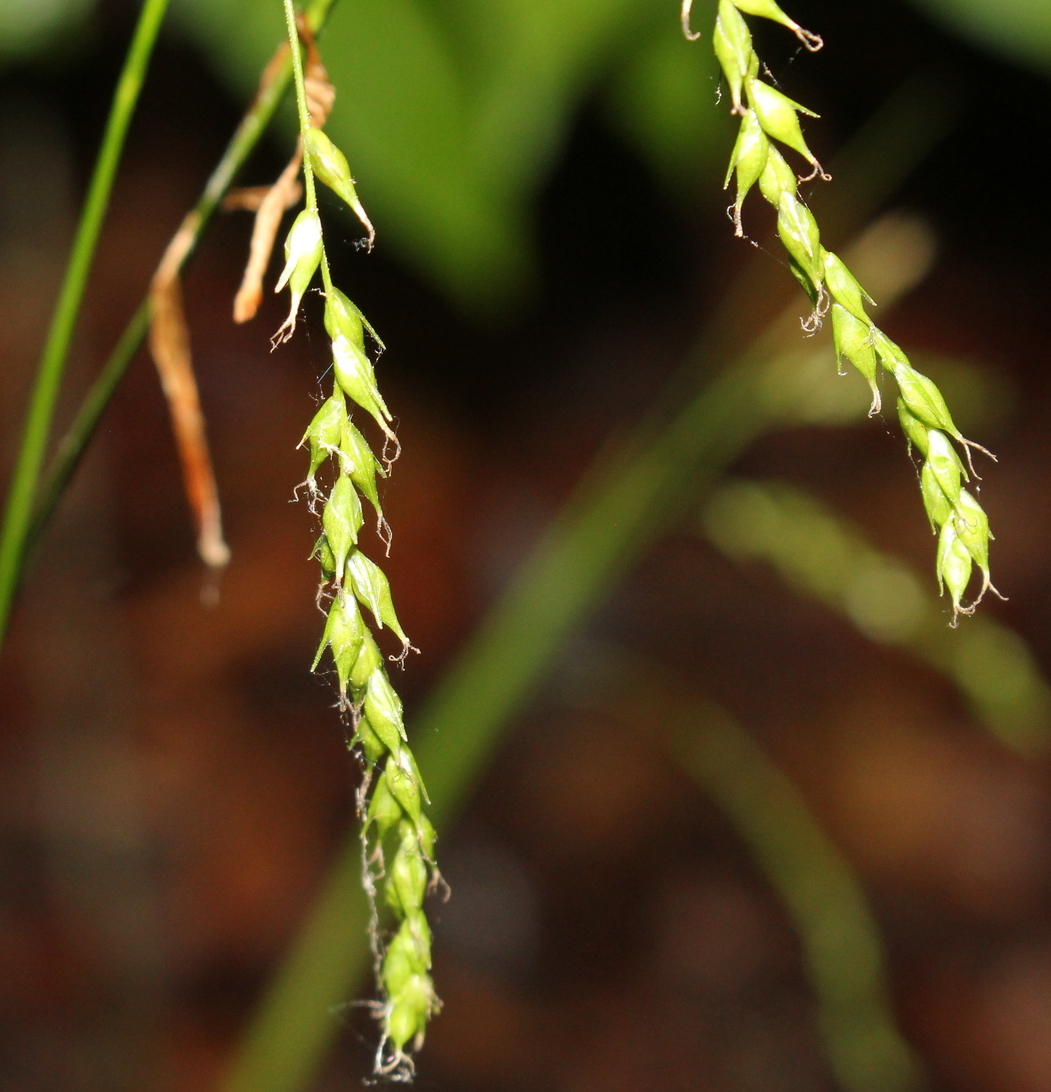
Close-up of pistillate spikelets

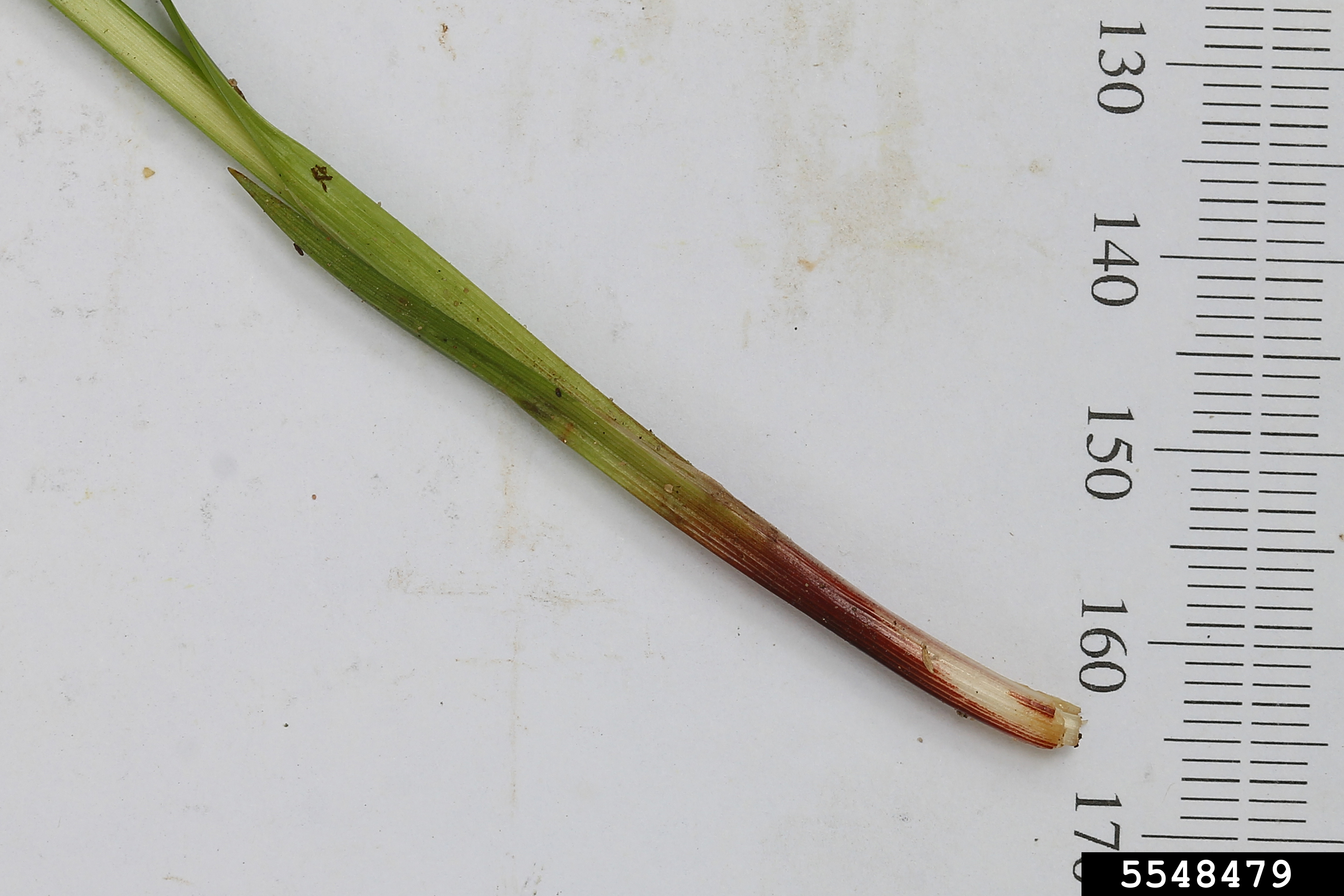
Culms are dark maroon at the base
