= Polygala ambigua =

Polygala ambigua may refer to two different species of plants:

- Polygala ambigua Nutt., a taxonomic synonym for Senega ambigua
- Polygala ambigua Torr. & A.Gray, a taxonomic synonym for Senega nuttallii
