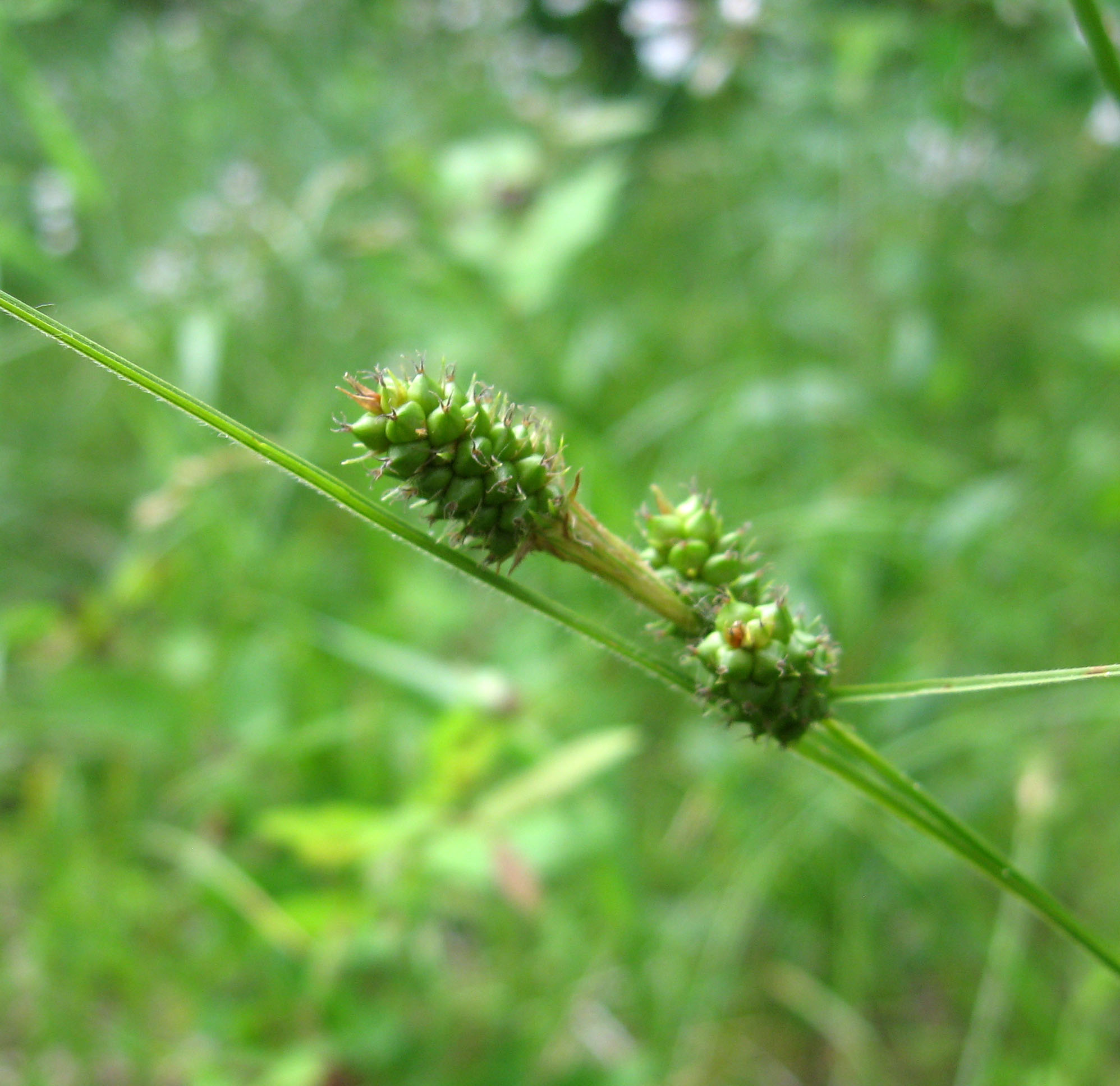

Scientific classification
- Kingdom: Plantae
- Clade: Tracheophytes
- Clade: Angiosperms
- Clade: Monocots
- Clade: Commelinids
- Order: Poales
- Family: Cyperaceae
- Genus: Carex
- Section: Carex sect. Porocystis
- Species: C. bushii

Binomial name
- Carex bushii Mack.

= Carex bushii =

Species of grass-like plant

Carex bushii, Bush's sedge, is a species of sedge in the genus Carex. It native to the eastern United States where it is found in areas of natural grassland.

Carex bushii is distinguished from the similar Carex caroliniana, Carex complanata, and Carex hirsutella by having pistillate scales that are at least as long as the perigynia (the covering of the achene).
