= Fauna of Connecticut =

Fauna of the US state of Connecticut

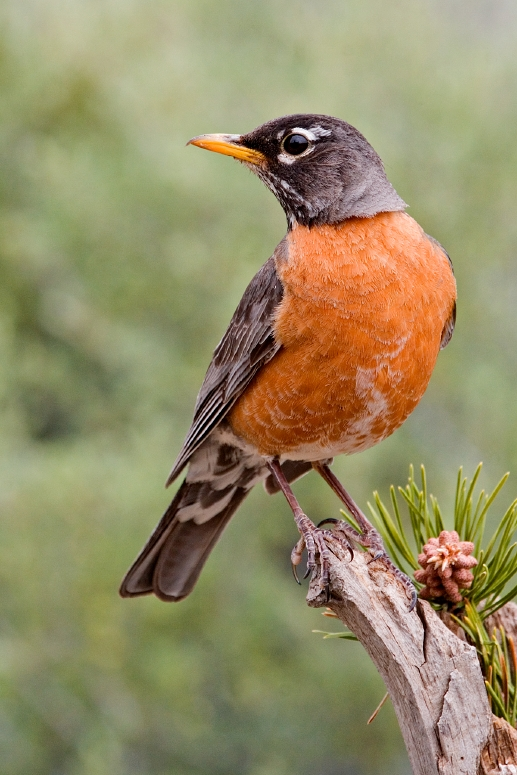
American robin

The fauna of Connecticut comprise a variety of animal species.

- The state bird is the American robin.
- The state insect is the European mantis.
- The state animal is the sperm whale.
- The state shellfish is the eastern oyster.
- The state fish is the American shad.
- The state fossil is the Eubrontes giganteus.

== Biodiversity ==
There are, as of 2004, 256 Connecticut species listed as endangered, threatened or of special concern. These are 11 species of mammals, 50 species of birds, 11 species of reptiles, 7 species of amphibians, 7 species of fish, and 170 species of invertebrates.

== Ancient life ==
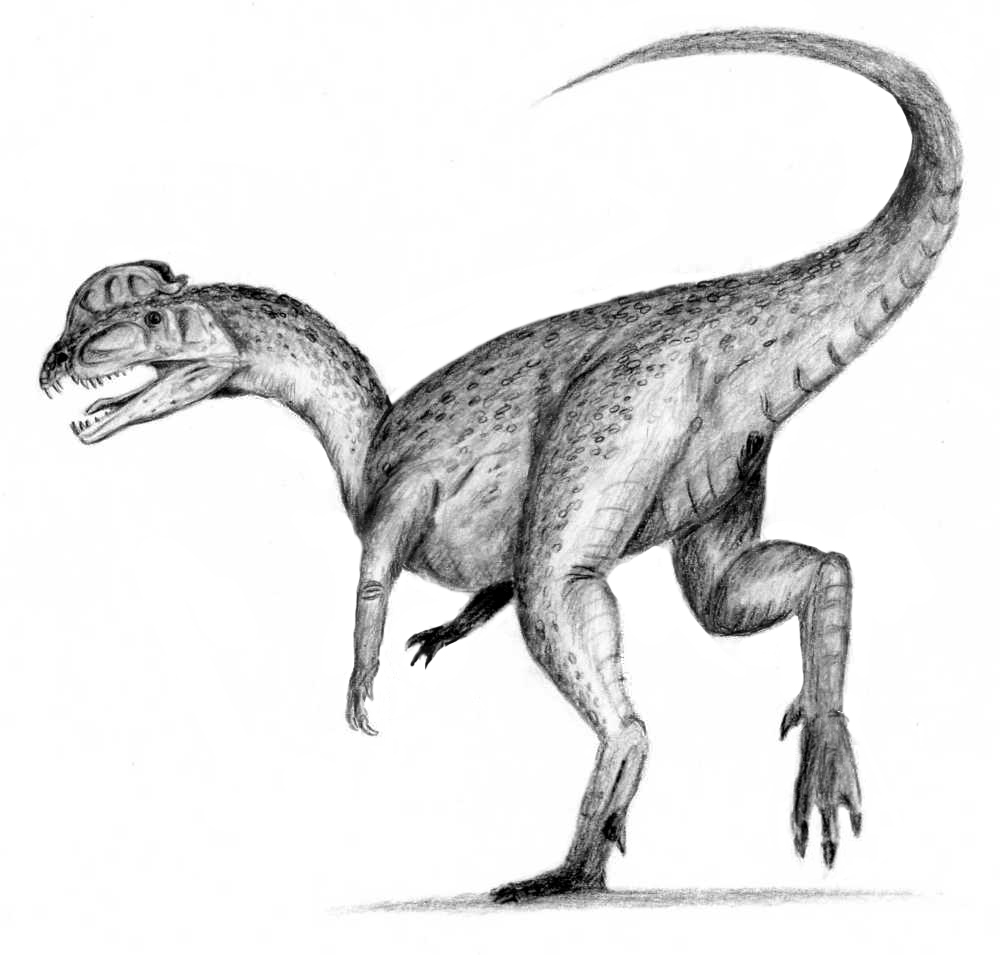
Artist's depiction of a Dilophosaurus wetherelli

Notable sites preserving the prehistoric history of Connecticut include the Peabody Museum of Natural History and Dinosaur State Park.

Extinct species that once roamed Connecticut include Coelophysis, Dilophosaurus, and Eubrontes.

== List of native species ==
Sources appear below.

=== Annelids ===
- Ampharete arctica
- Capitella capitata
- Capitellidae
- Eteone lactea
- Glycera dibranchiata
- Alitta (Nereis) succinea
- Opheliidae sp.
- Phyllodoce sp.
- Polydora sp.
- Scoloplos robustus
- Spio setosa
- Spionidae
- Streblospio benedicti
- Syllidae sp.

=== Arthropods ===
- Chiridotea spp.
- Gammarus sp.
- Neomysis americana
- Sphaeroma quadridentata

=== Mollusks ===
- Acteocina canaliculata
- Gemma gemma
- Nassarius obsoletus
- Mulinia lateralis
- Mya arenaria
- Nucula sp.
- Periploma papyratium
- Retusa canaliculata
- Tellina agillis

== See also ==
- Flora of Connecticut
- List of birds of Connecticut
- List of mammals of Connecticut
- List of mammals of New England
