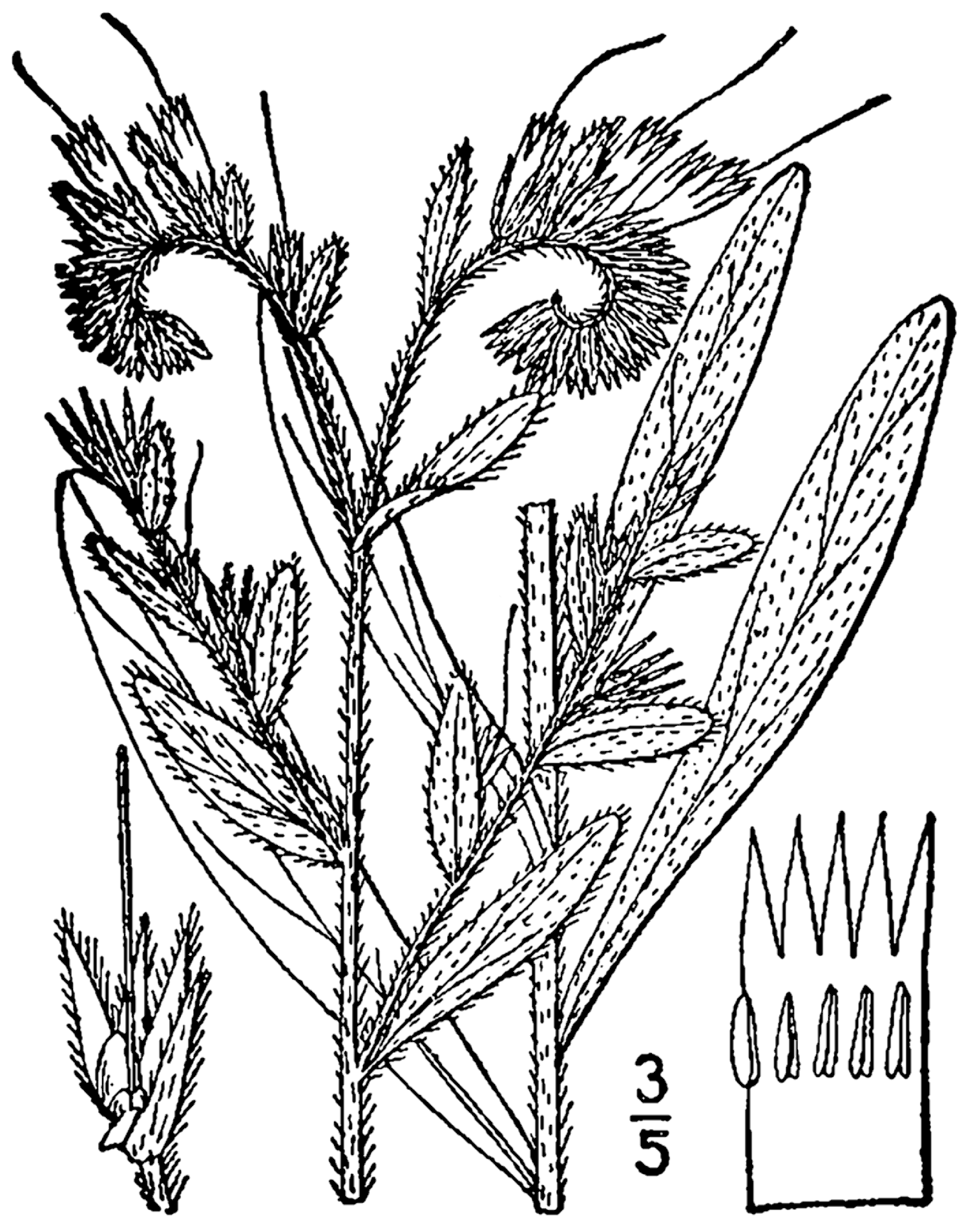

Scientific classification
- Kingdom: Plantae
- Clade: Tracheophytes
- Clade: Angiosperms
- Clade: Eudicots
- Clade: Asterids
- Order: Boraginales
- Family: Boraginaceae
- Genus: Onosmodium
- Species: O. virginianum

Binomial name
- Onosmodium virginianum (L.) A.DC.

Synonyms
- Lithospermum virginianum

= Onosmodium virginianum =

Species of flowering plant

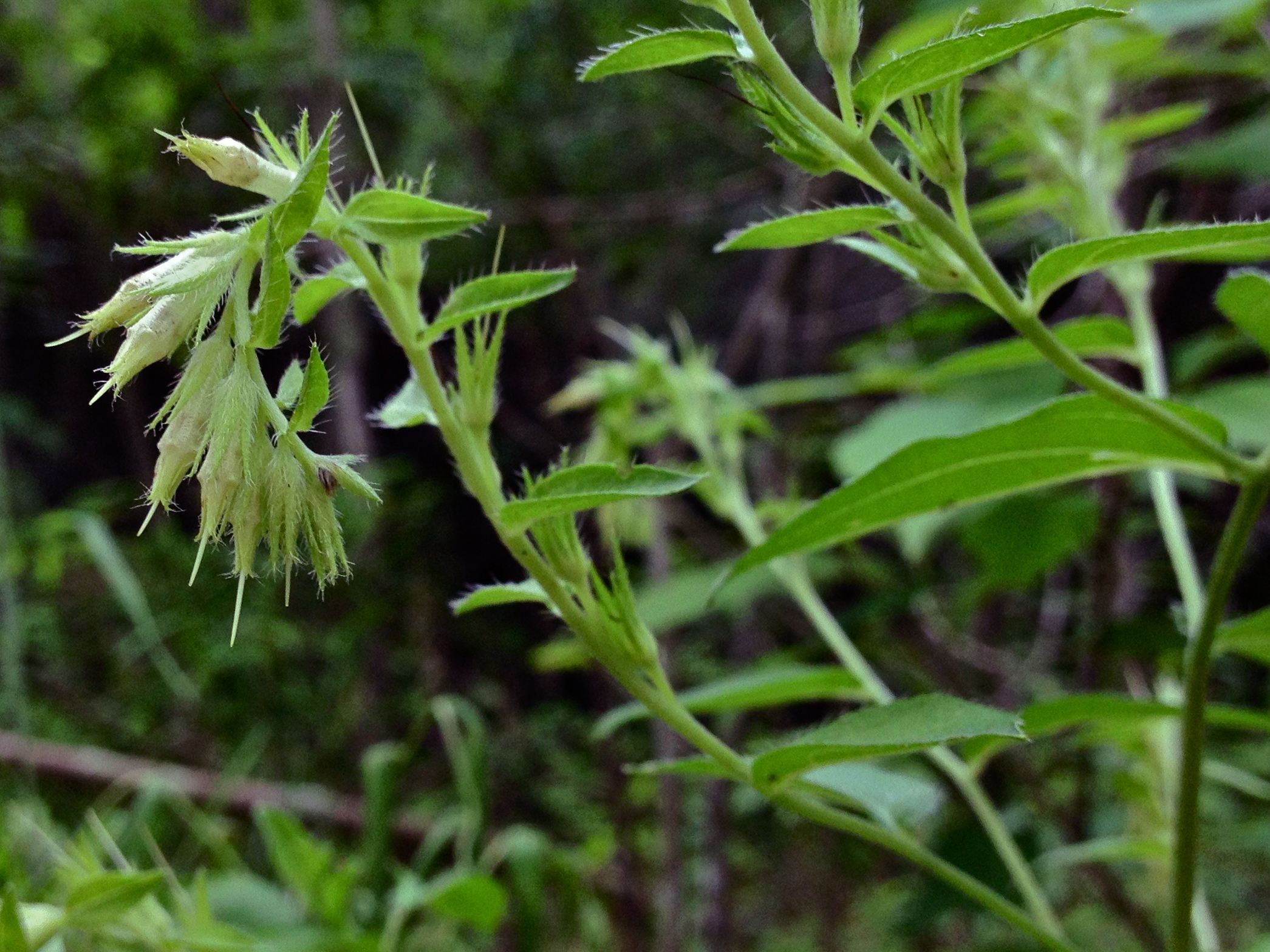
Onosmodium virginianum

Onosmodium virginianum, common names gravel-weed, wild Job's tears, false gromwell, and Virginia false-gromwell is perennial plant native to the eastern United States.

== Distribution and habitat ==
O. virginianum's range stretches from Louisiana to Florida, and northwards to New York and Massachusetts.

This species has been observed in environments with dry, loamy soil, such as that found in sandhill and longleaf pine communities.

== Conservation status ==
It is endangered in Connecticut, Maryland, New Jersey, New York (state), extirpated in Pennsylvania, and as historical in Rhode Island.
