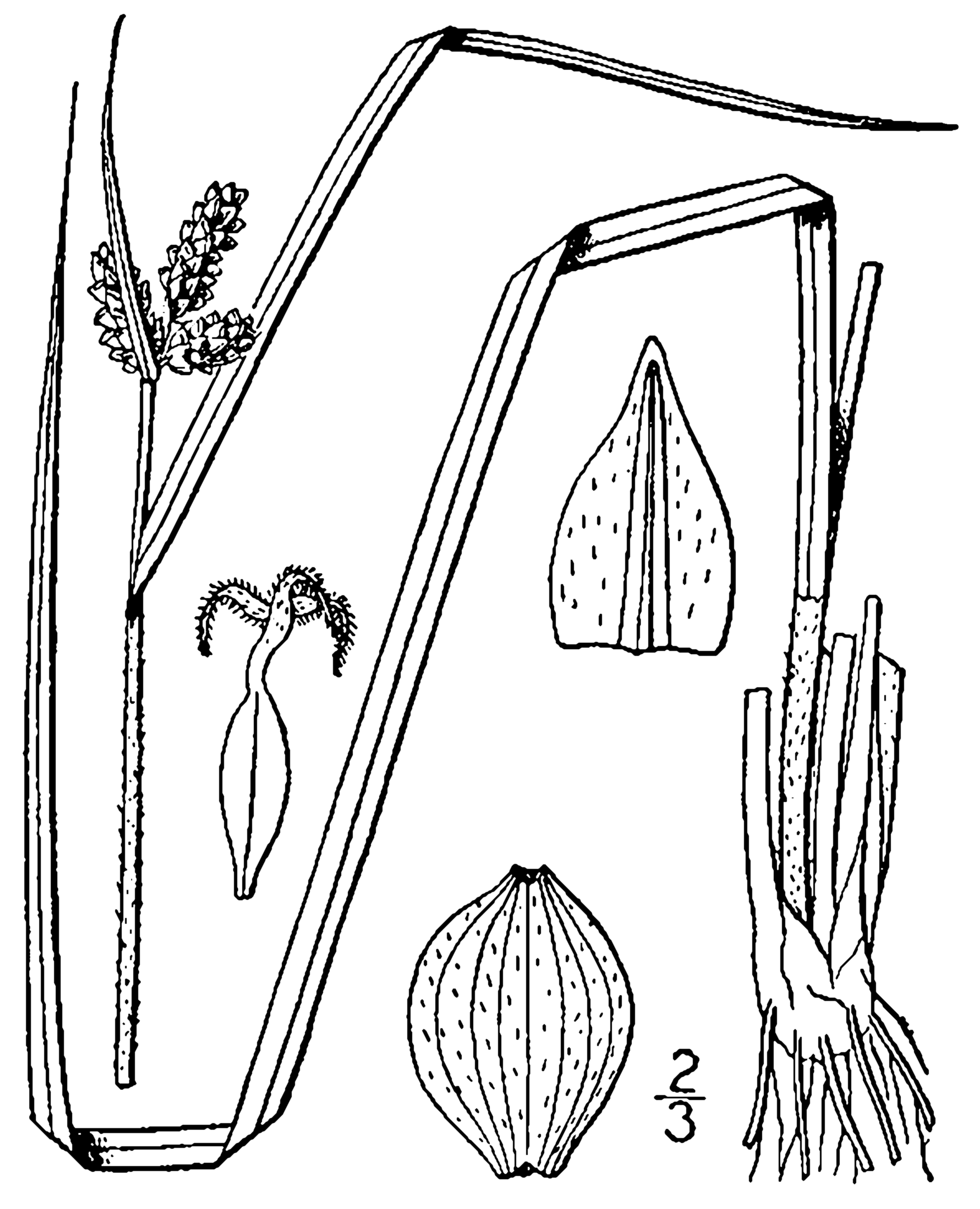
- Botanical illustration

Scientific classification
- Kingdom: Plantae
- Clade: Embryophytes
- Clade: Tracheophytes
- Clade: Angiosperms
- Clade: Monocots
- Clade: Commelinids
- Order: Poales
- Family: Cyperaceae
- Genus: Carex
- Species: C. complanata

Binomial name
- Carex complanata Torr. & Hook.

Synonyms
- Carex bolliana Boeckeler; Carex complanata var. robusta Burnham; Facolos complanata (Torr. & Hook.) Raf.

= Carex complanata =

Species of plant

Carex complanata, the hirsute sedge, is a species of flowering plant in the family Cyperaceae. A rhizomatous perennial reaching 30 in (75 cm), it is a facultative wetland species. It has two subspecies, one native to the central and southeastern United States, the other to southern Mexico and to Guatemala.

The American subspecies is hardy in USDA zones 4 to 9, and is recommended as a low-maintenance native choice in rain gardens, as a ground cover beneath trees, and for erosion control.

== Subtaxa ==
The following subspecies are accepted:

- Carex complanata subsp. complanata – Southeastern United States, as well as Iowa, Missouri, New Jersey, and Texas
- Carex complanata subsp. tropicalis Reznicek & S.González – Southern Mexico, Guatemala
