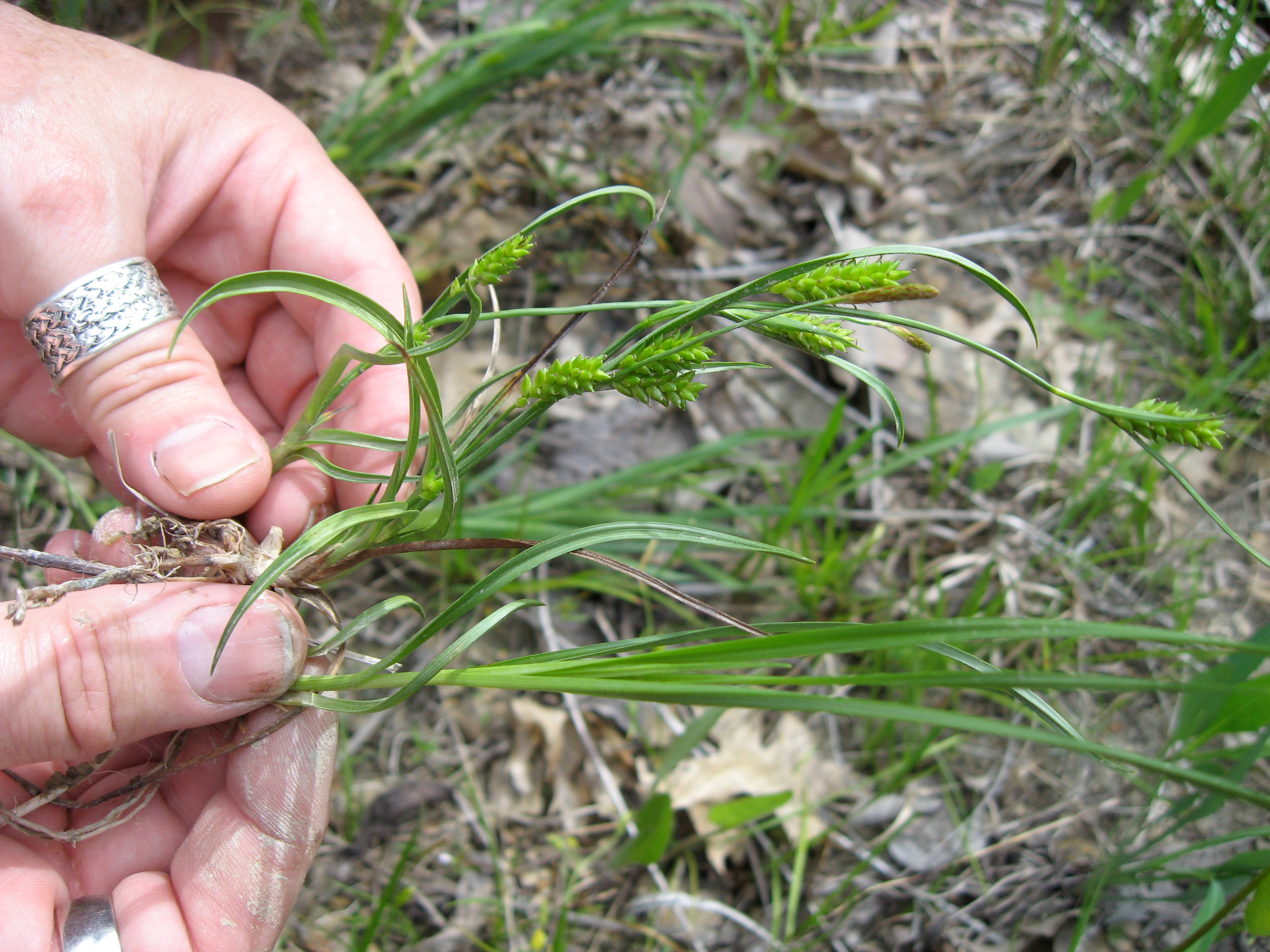
- Showing characteristic long rhizomes

Conservation status
- Secure (NatureServe)

Scientific classification
- Kingdom: Plantae
- Clade: Tracheophytes
- Clade: Angiosperms
- Clade: Monocots
- Clade: Commelinids
- Order: Poales
- Family: Cyperaceae
- Genus: Carex
- Section: Carex sect. Granulares
- Species: C. crawei

Binomial name
- Carex crawei Dewey

= Carex crawei =

Species of grass-like plant

Carex crawei, commonly called Crawe's sedge, is a species of flowering plant in the sedge family. It is native to North America, where it is widespread in the United States and Canada. Though widespread, it has a patchy distribution and is generally rare throughout its range. It is found in wet calcareous areas, usually associated with flat limestone outcrops or gravels. It is usually found in high quality natural habitats.

It is a rhizomatous perennial that flowers in early spring.
