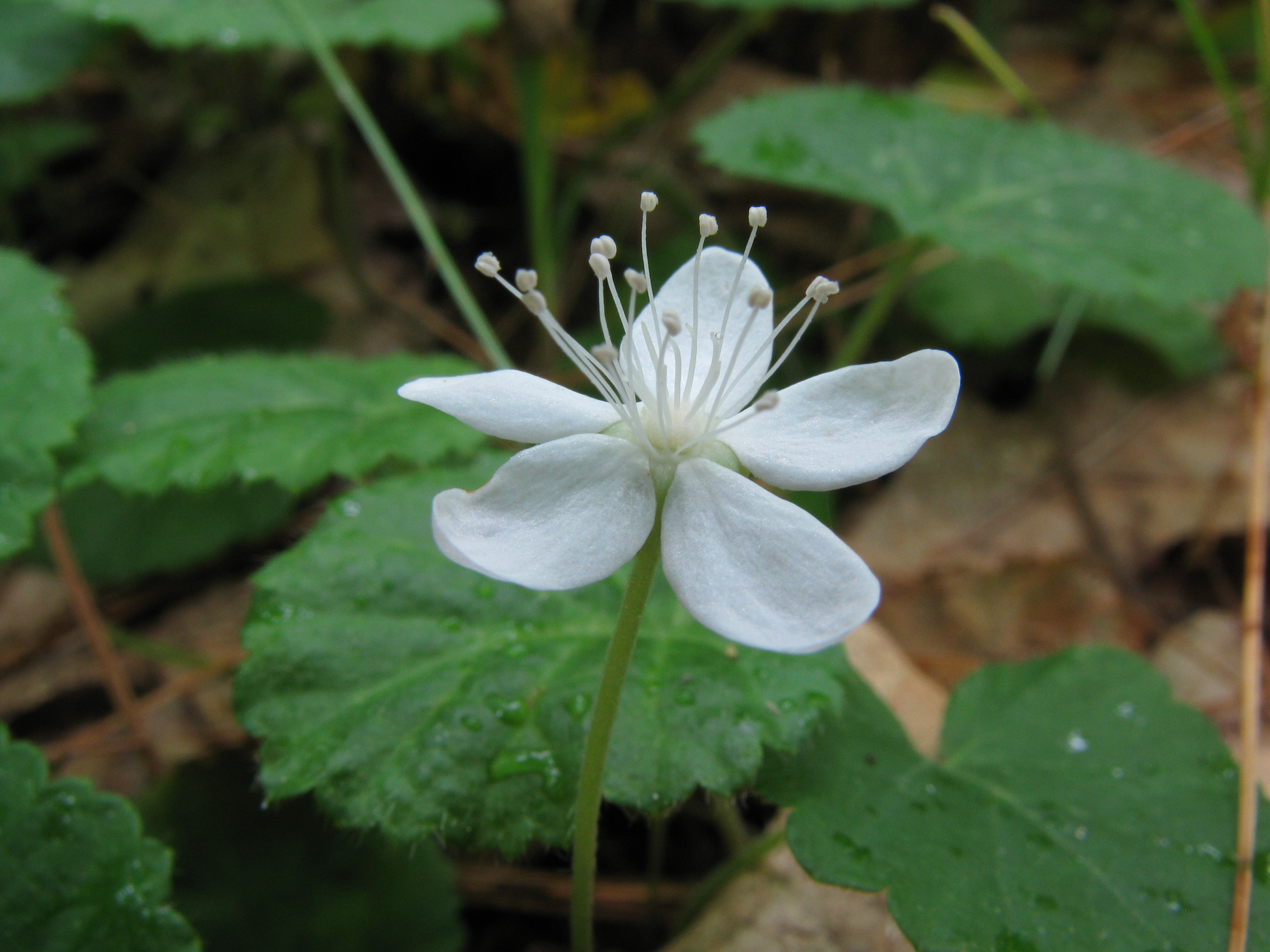
- Foliage and flower

Scientific classification
- Kingdom: Plantae
- Clade: Embryophytes
- Clade: Tracheophytes
- Clade: Spermatophytes
- Clade: Angiosperms
- Clade: Eudicots
- Clade: Rosids
- Order: Rosales
- Family: Rosaceae
- Genus: Rubus
- Species: R. repens

Binomial name
- Rubus repens (L.) Kuntze (1891), nom. cons. prop.

Synonyms
- Dalibarda cordata Stephan (1806), nom. superfl.; Dalibarda repens L. (1753); Dalibarda violioides Michx. (1803); Rubus dalibarda L. (1762), nom. superfl.

= Rubus repens =

Genus of flowering plants

Rubus repens (commonly known as dewdrop, false violet, star violet, and Robin runaway, and in French Canadian: dalibarde rampante) is a perennial North American species of bramble, although some sources consider it the sole member of a separate genus, Dalibarda.

== Description ==
Rubus repens is a perennial herbaceous plant. It is low, spreading by runners, growing to 5 to 13 centimetres (2 to 5 inches) tall. The leaves and flowers arise on stalks separate from the runner. The stem is hairy, decumbent/creeping, several inches in length, with a densely tufted terminal portion bearing both leaves and flowers.

The leaves are basal, simple or kidney-shaped, pinnately veined above the base, long-petiolate, and slightly hairy/downy on both sides. They are dark green in color. The leaf blades are cordate to rounded (orbicular) and 3–5 cm (1 1/4–2 in) long. The basal lobes are rounded, the apex is blunt to rounded, and the margins are scalloped with low rounded teeth (crenate). The petioles are hairy and 3–10 cm long.

The plant has both sterile and fertile flowers. It flowers from June to August. The sterile flowers are much less numerous than the fertile ones, have five white petals and are borne solitarily atop a reddish peduncle. They have numerous long stamens. The more numerous fertile flowers are cleistogamous (being self-pollinating and never opening) and are hidden beneath the leaves. The flower stalks (peduncles) of the cleistogamous flowers are short, 2–5 cm long, and curved downward. The calyx forms a shallow, hairy hypanthium, which is divided into 5–6 lobes of unequal size, the 3 larger lobes are toothed (serrate).

A few, nearly dry, small white drupes (drupelets), 3–4 mm long, retained within the calyx are produced.

=== Similar species ===
The leaves of dewdrop may be confused with violet leaves, but violets have low rounded teeth that curve upward; the leaf margins of dewdrop have low scalloped edges or outward-facing blunt teeth.

== Taxonomy ==
Generally considered to be a member of Rubus, or a bramble (along with blackberries and raspberries), some authorities consider the species to be the sole member of a separate genus, Dalibarda.

=== Etymology ===
The common name 'false violet' comes not only from the heart-shaped leaves, but also because this plant, like violets, produces two kinds of flowers.

== Distribution and habitat ==
The species is native to eastern and central Canada and the northeastern and north-central United States. It is found in Minnesota in the west to Nova Scotia in the east, southward to Michigan, Pennsylvania and New Jersey, and in the mountains to North Carolina.

It grows fairly easily in shady locations in damp to wet, acidic soil. It is found in northern or upland forests, in shady locations, in conifer and mixed wood (softwoods and hardwoods) forests or swamps, and often on red pine and white pine sites with sandy, acidic soil. It is frequently used in wildflower and bog gardens as a groundcover.

== Conservation ==
Though this plant is globally secure, it is locally endangered in Connecticut, New Jersey, North Carolina and Rhode Island. It is listed as threatened in Michigan and Ohio.

== Uses ==
As with its close relatives in Rubus, the young plants make a reasonably palatable pot-herb, and can be brewed as a mild infusion/tea throughout the growing season. The fruit is edible, but decidedly not "choice".
