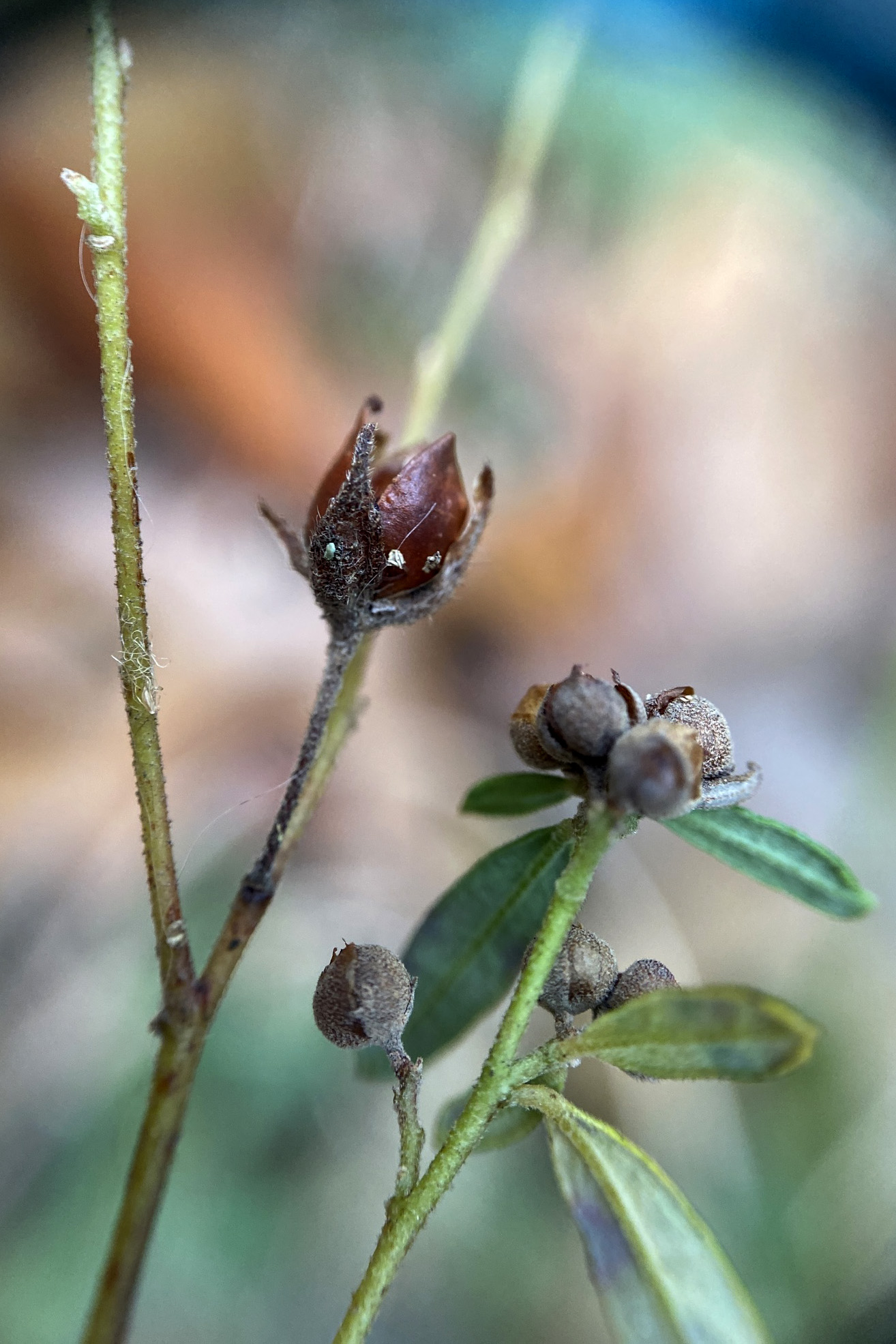

Scientific classification
- Kingdom: Plantae
- Clade: Embryophytes
- Clade: Tracheophytes
- Clade: Spermatophytes
- Clade: Angiosperms
- Clade: Eudicots
- Clade: Rosids
- Order: Malvales
- Family: Cistaceae
- Genus: Helianthemum
- Species: H. propinquum

Binomial name
- Helianthemum propinquum E.P.Bicknell

= Helianthemum propinquum =

Species of flowering plant

Helianthemum propinquum, formerly called Crocanthemum propinquum, common names low frostweed and low rockrose, is a perennial plant that is native to the United States.

== Conservation status ==
It is listed as endangered in Connecticut, and as a species of special concern in Rhode Island and Tennessee.
