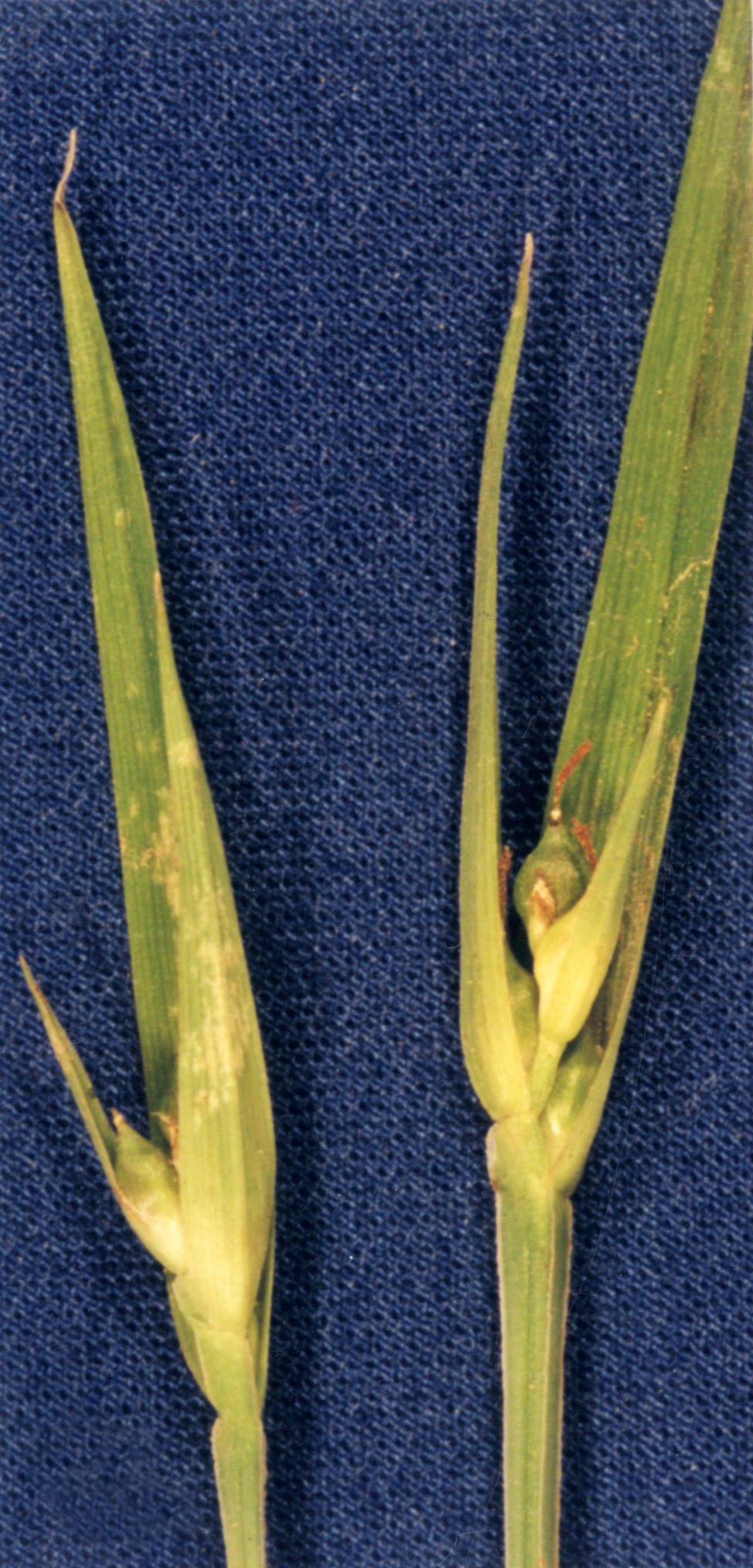

Scientific classification
- Kingdom: Plantae
- Clade: Tracheophytes
- Clade: Angiosperms
- Clade: Monocots
- Clade: Commelinids
- Order: Poales
- Family: Cyperaceae
- Genus: Carex
- Section: Carex sect. Phyllostachyae
- Species: C. backii

Binomial name
- Carex backii Boott

= Carex backii =

Species of grass-like plant

Carex backii, commonly known as Back's sedge, is a species of sedge (Carex) in the section Phyllostachyae. First described scientifically in 1839 by American botanist Francis Boott, it is found in Canada and the United States, where it grows in shaded woods, shaded slopes, and shrub thickets.

== Description ==
The plants have culms that grow 3–25 cm (1.2–9.8 in) high, and deep-green to yellowish-green leaves measuring 2–5 mm wide. The inflorescence is typically a single terminal spike lacking a spike bract.
