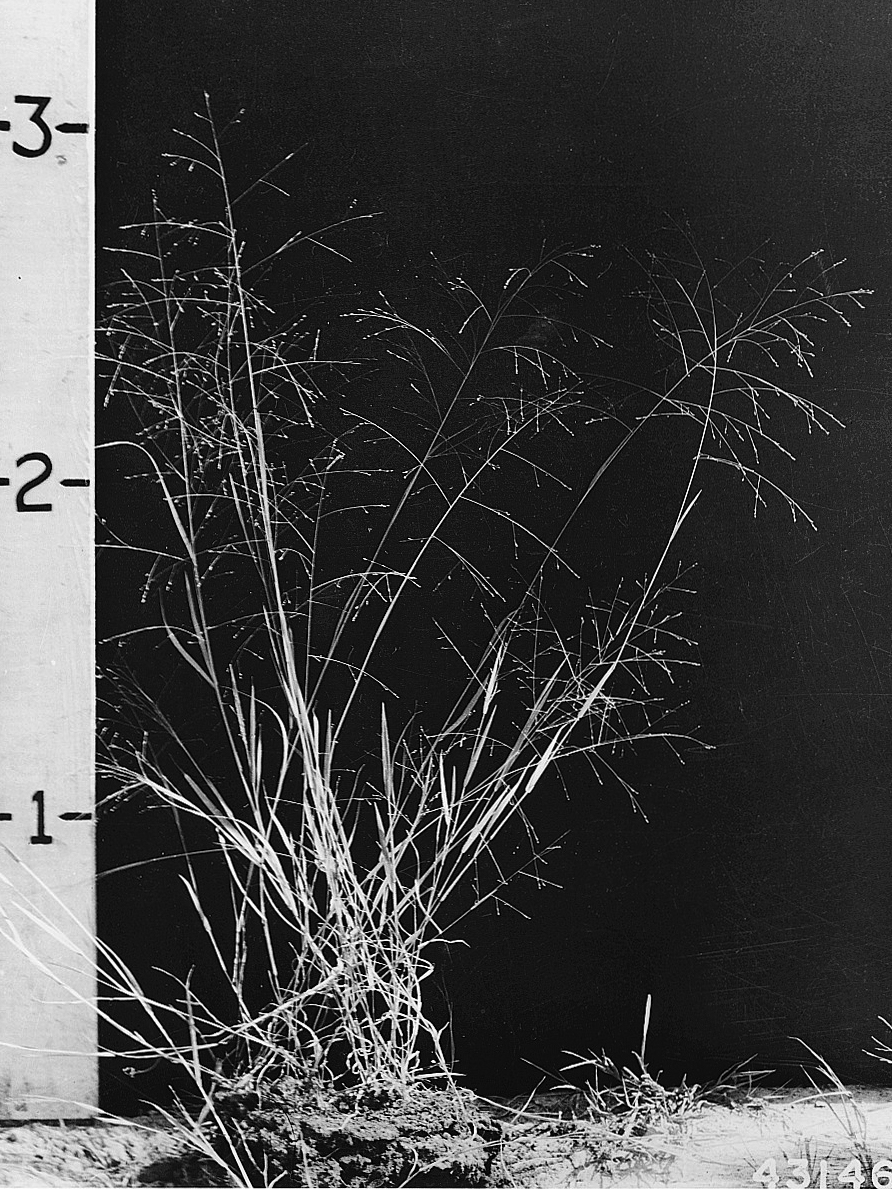

Scientific classification
- Kingdom: Plantae
- Clade: Tracheophytes
- Clade: Angiosperms
- Clade: Monocots
- Clade: Commelinids
- Order: Poales
- Family: Poaceae
- Subfamily: Panicoideae
- Genus: Panicum
- Species: P. verrucosum

Binomial name
- Panicum verrucosum Muhl.

= Panicum verrucosum =

Species of grass-like plant

Panicum verrucosum, common name warty panicgrass, is a plant in North America. It is listed as a special concern and believed extirpated in Connecticut. It is listed as threatened in Indiana and Michigan, and as endangered in Ohio.

This species has decumbent to sprawling growth. Its leaves are 15 centimeters (approximately 5.9 inches) long and range in width between 2 and 10 millimeters (0.08 to 0.4 inches).

P. verrucosum has been observed in habitat types such as pine-wiregrass savannas, sandhills, in wooded floodplains, and along bodies of water. It occurs in loamy, sandy, or wet soils.
