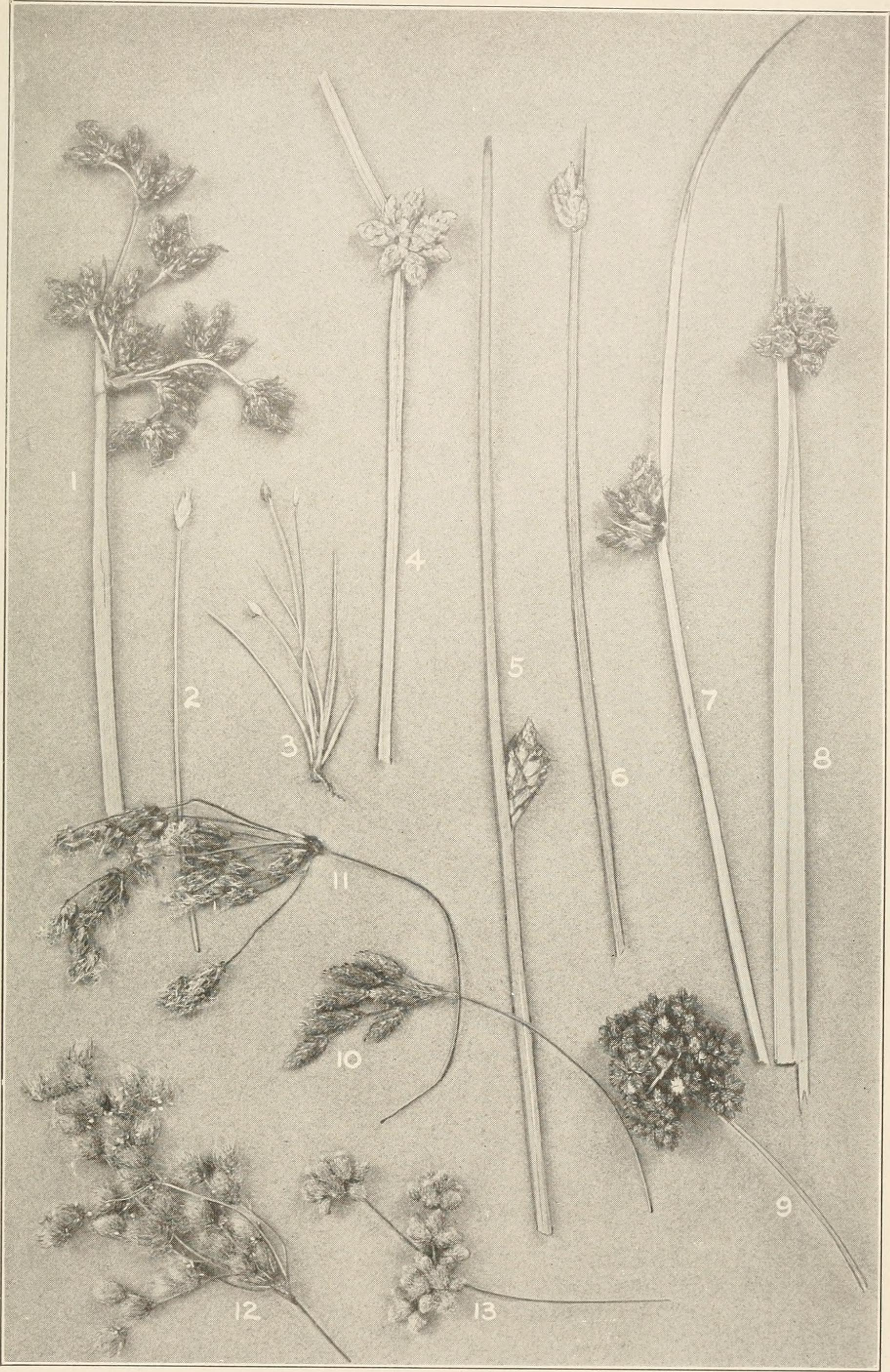

Scientific classification
- Kingdom: Plantae
- Clade: Tracheophytes
- Clade: Angiosperms
- Clade: Monocots
- Clade: Commelinids
- Order: Poales
- Family: Cyperaceae
- Genus: Eleocharis
- Species: E. microcarpa

Binomial name
- Eleocharis microcarpa Torr.

= Eleocharis microcarpa =

Species of grass-like plant

Eleocharis microcarpa, common names small-fruited spikesedge, spike-rush, small-fruited spike-rush and tiny-fruited spike-sedge, is a plant in the Eleocharis genus found in North America.

== Conservation status ==
It is listed as endangered in Indiana and Michigan. Eleocharis microcarpa var. filiculmis is a special concern and believed extirpated in Connecticut, and is listed as endangered in Massachusetts.
