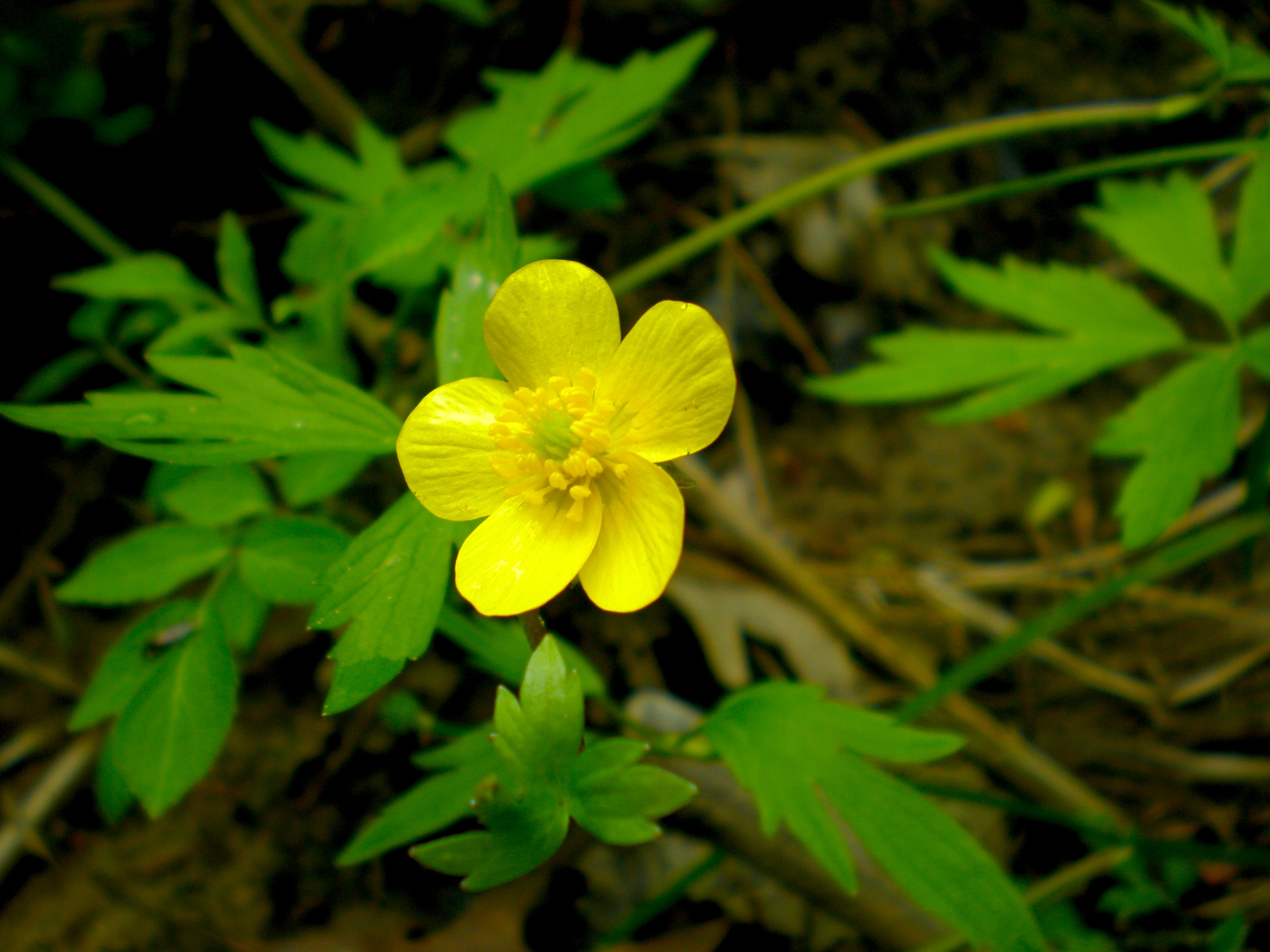

Scientific classification
- Kingdom: Plantae
- Clade: Tracheophytes
- Clade: Angiosperms
- Clade: Eudicots
- Order: Ranunculales
- Family: Ranunculaceae
- Genus: Ranunculus
- Species: R. septentrionalis

Binomial name
- Ranunculus septentrionalis Poir.

= Ranunculus septentrionalis =

Species of buttercup

Ranunculus septentrionalis, the swamp buttercup, is a species of buttercup found in North America from New Brunswick to Manitoba and from Georgia to Kansas. Although some authors treat it as a distinct species, others consider it to be a subspecies of Ranunculus hispidus.
