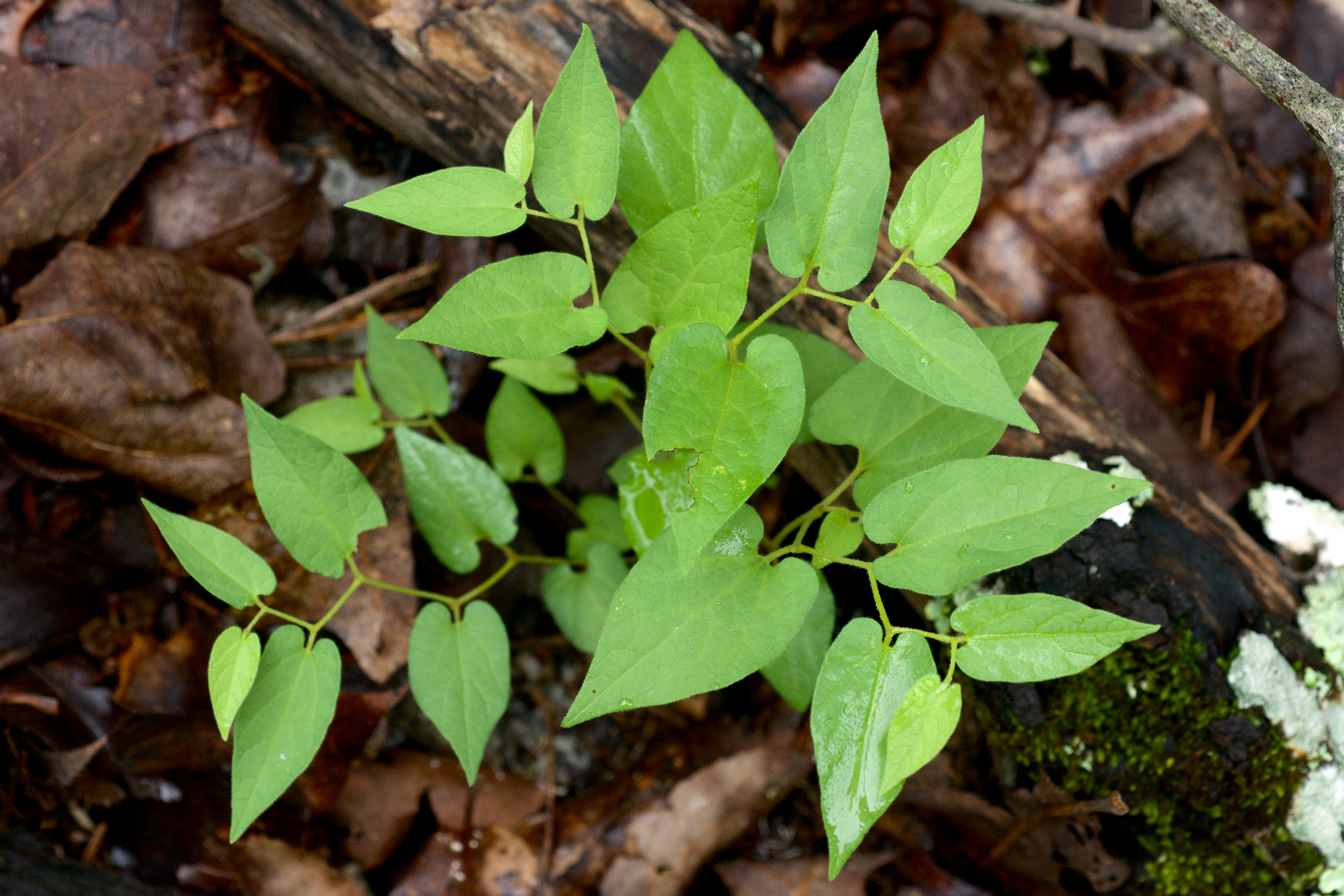

Conservation status
- Apparently Secure (NatureServe)

Scientific classification
- Kingdom: Plantae
- Clade: Tracheophytes
- Clade: Angiosperms
- Clade: Magnoliids
- Order: Piperales
- Family: Aristolochiaceae
- Genus: Aristolochia
- Species: A. serpentaria

Binomial name
- Aristolochia serpentaria L.

Synonyms
- A. convolvulacea Small; A. hastata Nutt.; A. nashii Kearney; A. serpentaria L. var. hastata (Nutt.) Duch.; A. serpentaria L. var. nashii (Kearney) H.E. Ahles; Endodeca serpentaria (L.) Raf. var. hastata (Nutt.) C.F. Reed

= Aristolochia serpentaria =

Species of vine

Aristolochia serpentaria is a species of perennial flowering plant in the Aristolochiaceae (birthwort) family. The species is commonly known as Virginia snakeroot and is native to eastern North America, from Connecticut to southern Michigan and south to Texas and Florida.

== Description and ecology ==
They have pipe-shaped flowers and heart-shaped leaves. It is a larval host to the pipevine swallowtail and the polydamas swallowtail.

Thornton, in his Family Herbal, describes the plant as having "an aromatic smell, and a hot, pungent, bitterish taste".

== Protection ==
Virginia snakeroot is considered an endangered species in New York, where no reports of the species were made for the century between 1895 and 1994, when it was rediscovered in the Hudson Highlands. Since then, other scattered populations have been observed in the state.

The plant is also rare in Connecticut, where it is on that state's list of species of special concern. In Michigan, its status is "Threatened".

== Historical use ==
In the traditional medicine of the Cherokee, the root of this herb was chewed and spat upon the wounds made by snake bites. The plant was said to be a remedy for an ague in 18th-century England. It was also used as an ingredient for bitters.
