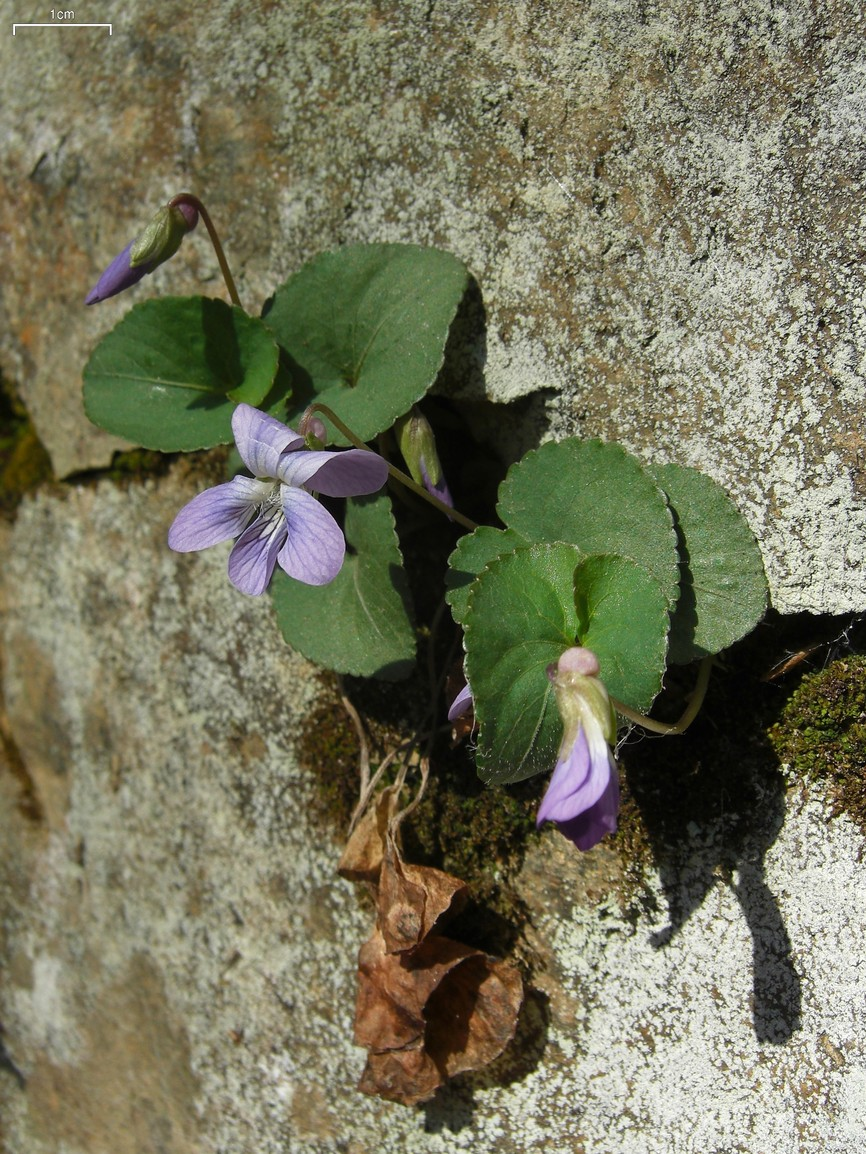

Scientific classification
- Kingdom: Plantae
- Clade: Tracheophytes
- Clade: Angiosperms
- Clade: Eudicots
- Clade: Rosids
- Order: Malpighiales
- Family: Violaceae
- Genus: Viola
- Species: V. hirsutula

Binomial name
- Viola hirsutula Brainerd

= Viola hirsutula =

Species of flowering plant

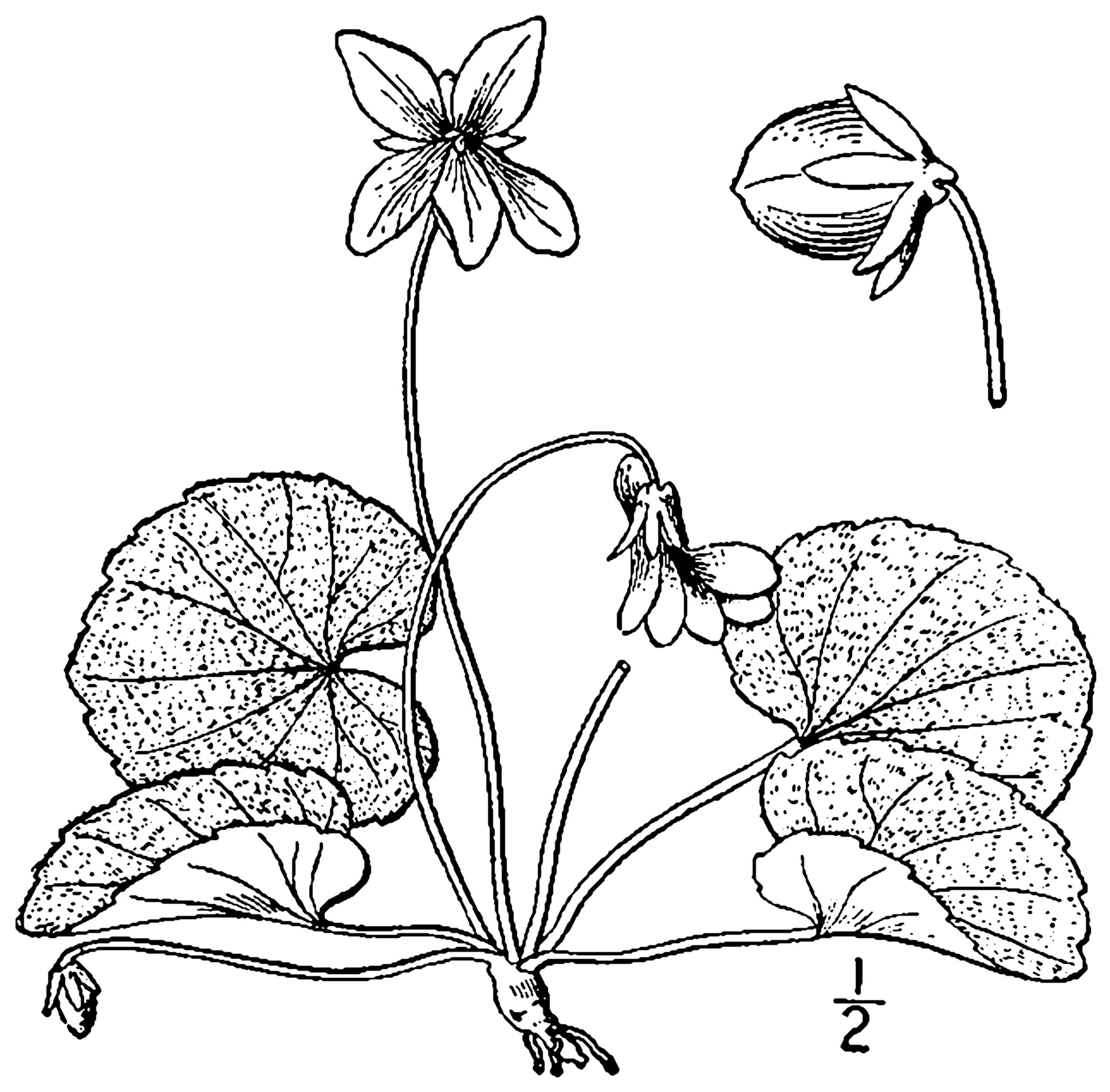
Botanical illustration

Viola hirsutula, common name southern woodland violet, is a perennial species of violet found in the eastern United States.

== Conservation status ==
It is listed extirpated in Indiana, endangered in New York, and as a special concern and believed extirpated in Connecticut.
