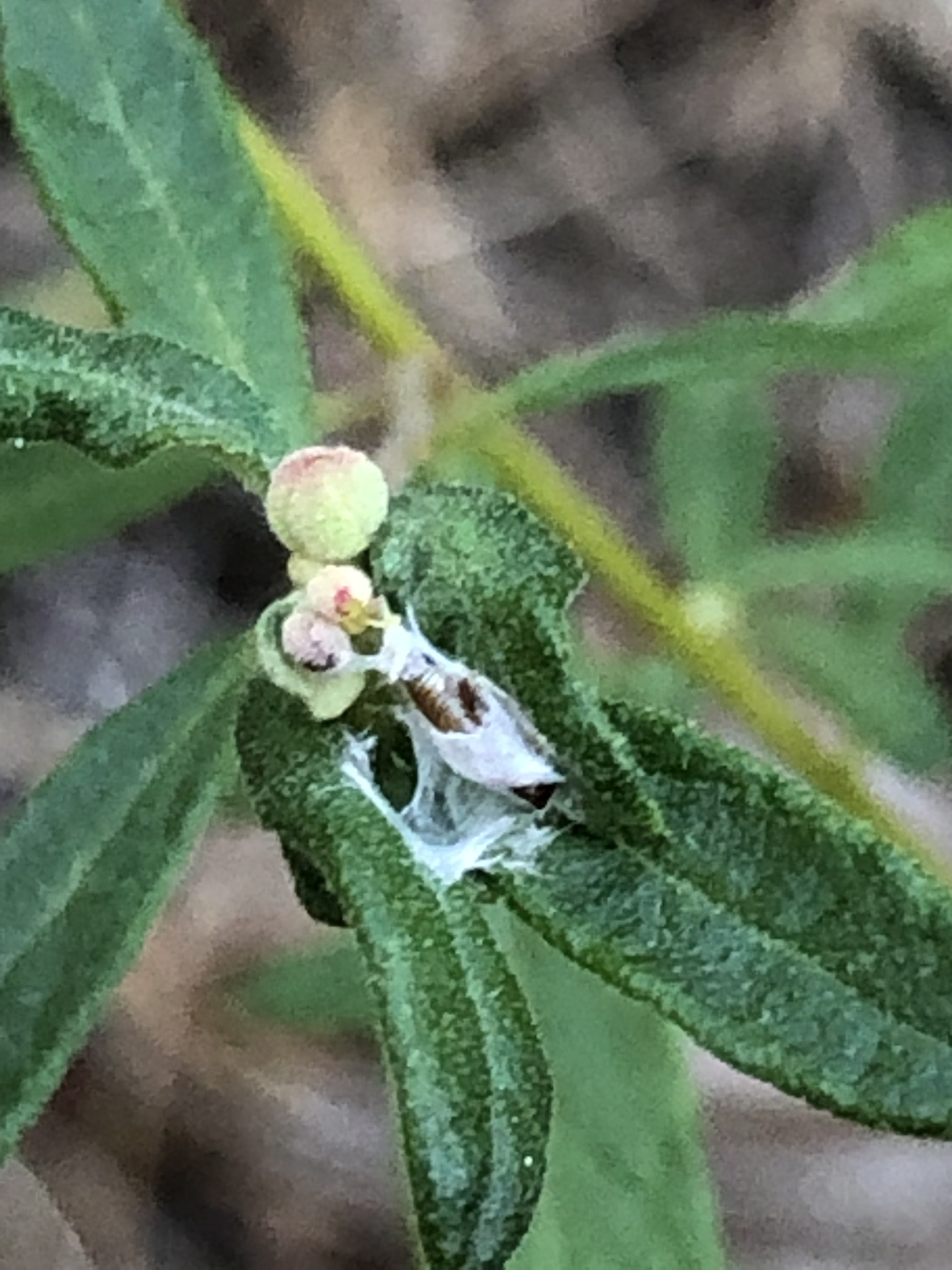

Scientific classification
- Kingdom: Plantae
- Clade: Embryophytes
- Clade: Tracheophytes
- Clade: Spermatophytes
- Clade: Angiosperms
- Clade: Eudicots
- Clade: Rosids
- Order: Malvales
- Family: Cistaceae
- Genus: Crocanthemum
- Species: C. dumosum

Binomial name
- Crocanthemum dumosum Bickn.

Synonyms
- Helianthemum dumosum

= Crocanthemum dumosum =

Species of flowering plant

Crocanthemum dumosum, common known as bushy frostweed and bushy rockrose, is a perennial plant that is native to the United States.

== Conservation status ==
It is listed as endangered in Rhode Island, threatened in New York, a species of special concern in Massachusetts, and a species of special concern in Connecticut, where it's believed to be extirpated.
