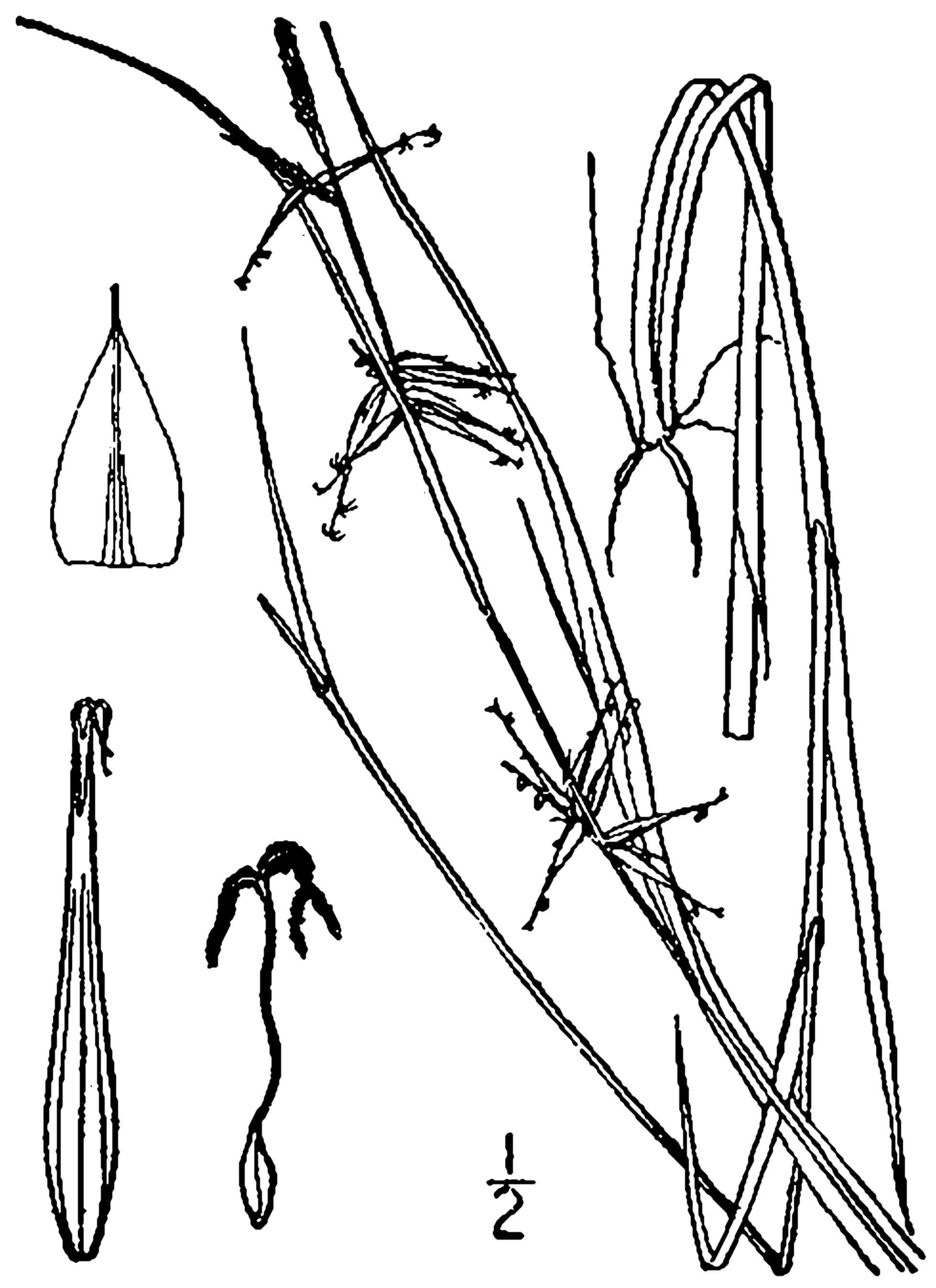

Scientific classification
- Kingdom: Plantae
- Clade: Tracheophytes
- Clade: Angiosperms
- Clade: Monocots
- Clade: Commelinids
- Order: Poales
- Family: Cyperaceae
- Genus: Carex
- Species: C. collinsii

Binomial name
- Carex collinsii Nutt.

= Carex collinsii =

Species of grass-like plant

Carex collinsii, common name Collins' sedge, is a species of Carex native to North America. It is listed as a special concern species and believed extirpated in Connecticut. It is listed as endangered in New York, as threatened in Pennsylvania, and its historical range included Rhode Island.
