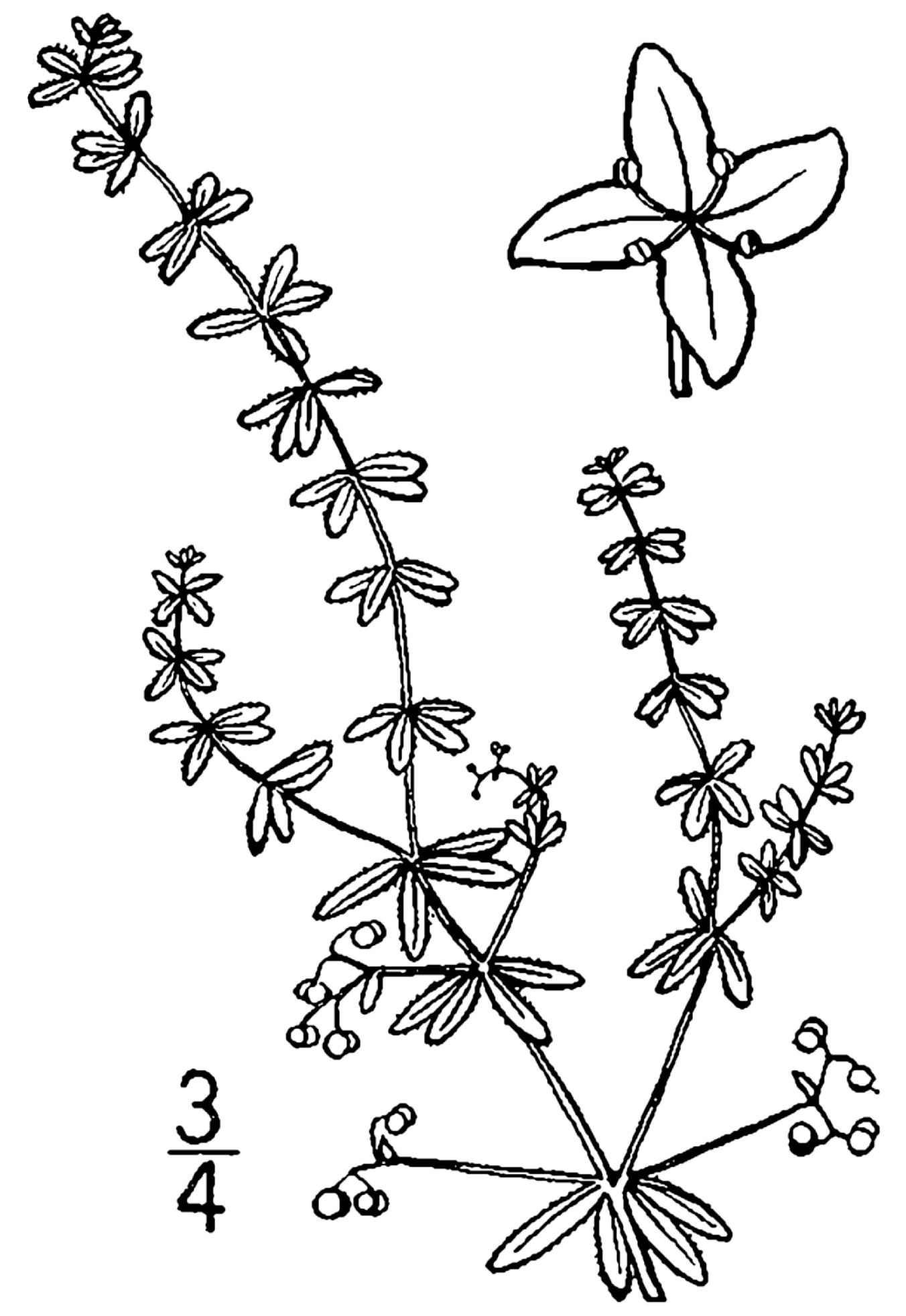

Scientific classification
- Kingdom: Plantae
- Clade: Tracheophytes
- Clade: Angiosperms
- Clade: Eudicots
- Clade: Asterids
- Order: Gentianales
- Family: Rubiaceae
- Genus: Galium
- Species: G. labradoricum

Binomial name
- Galium labradoricum (Wiegand) Wiegand

= Galium labradoricum =

Species of plant

Galium labradoricum (Labrador bedstraw or northern bog bedstraw) is a plant species in the family Rubiaceae. It is widespread across Canada, found in all provinces and territories except Yukon. It also occurs in Saint Pierre and Miquelon and in the northern United States, primarily in New England and the Great Lakes region, from Maine to the Dakotas. It is endangered in Connecticut.
