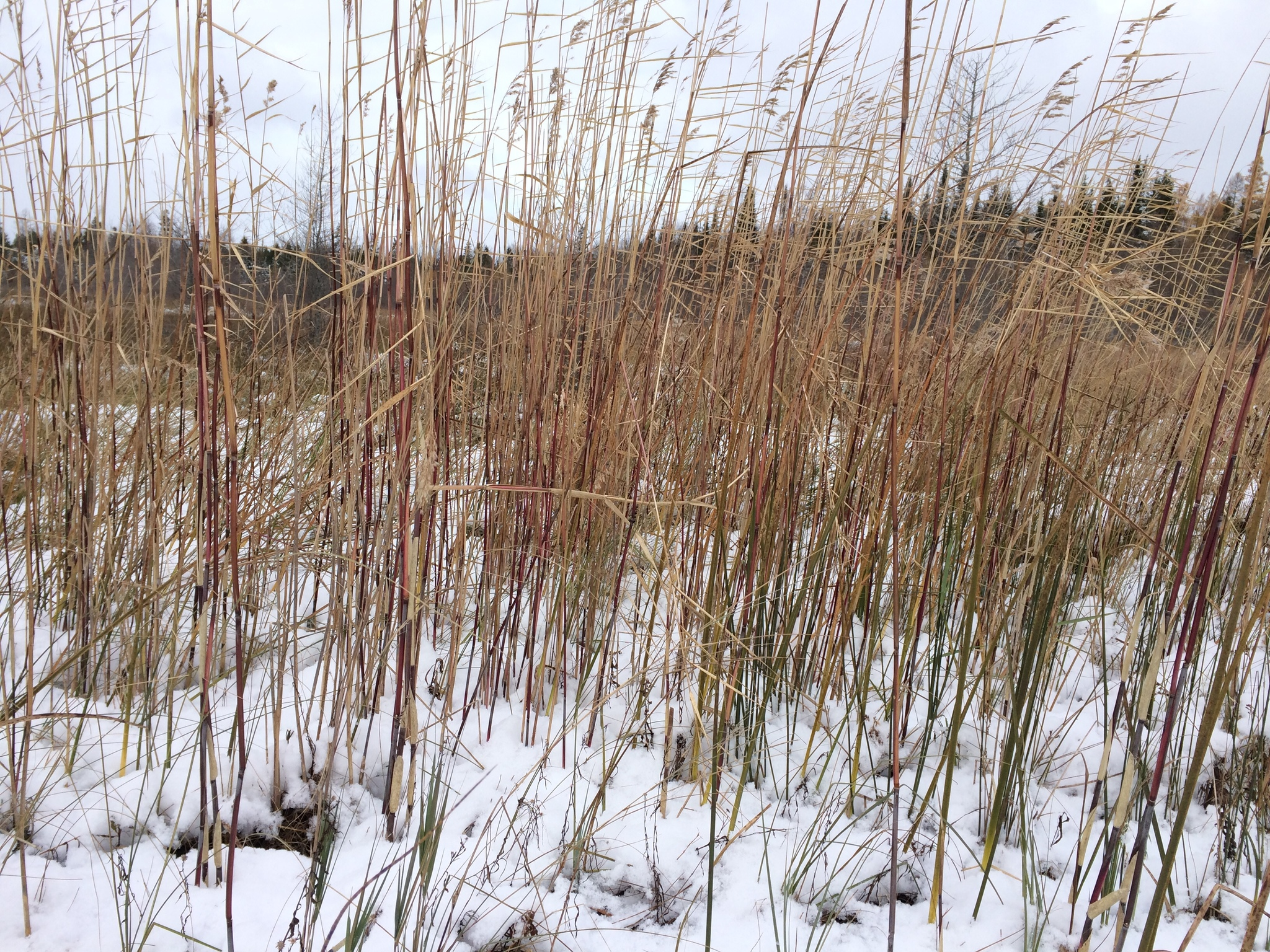

Scientific classification
- Kingdom: Plantae
- Clade: Tracheophytes
- Clade: Angiosperms
- Clade: Monocots
- Clade: Commelinids
- Order: Poales
- Family: Poaceae
- Genus: Phragmites
- Species: P. australis
- Subspecies: P. a. subsp. americanus

Trinomial name
- Phragmites australis subsp. americanus Saltonst., P.M.Peterson & Soreng

Synonyms
- Phragmites americanus (Saltonst., P.M.Peterson & Soreng) A.Haines

= Phragmites australis subsp. americanus =

Species of flowering plant

Phragmites australis subsp. americanus, synonym Phragmites americanus, common name American reed, is a subspecies of plant found in North America. It is listed as a special concern in Connecticut.
