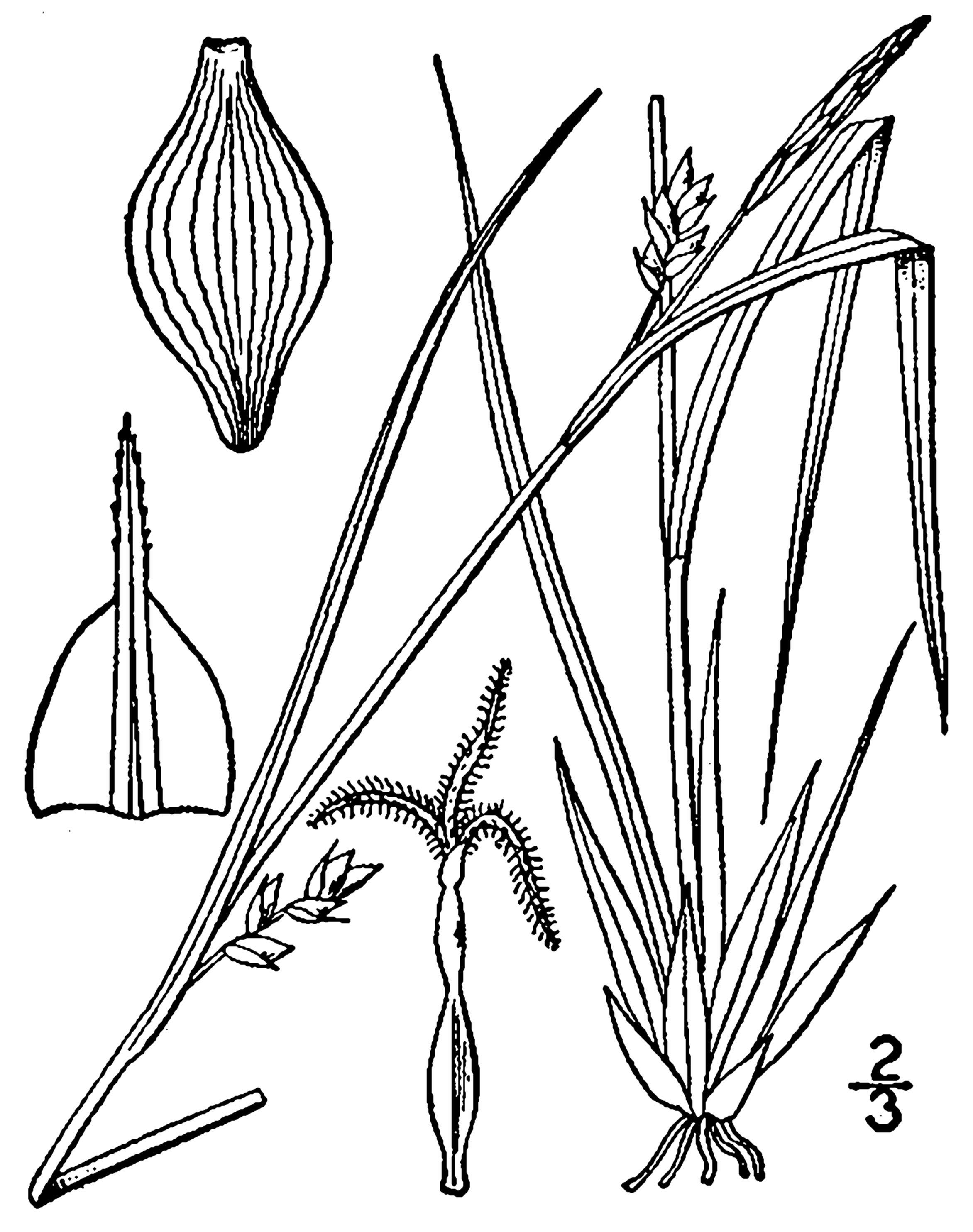
- Botanical illustration, 1913.

Scientific classification
- Kingdom: Plantae
- Clade: Tracheophytes
- Clade: Angiosperms
- Clade: Monocots
- Clade: Commelinids
- Order: Poales
- Family: Cyperaceae
- Genus: Carex
- Species: C. oligocarpa

Binomial name
- Carex oligocarpa Schkuhr ex Willd.

= Carex oligocarpa =

Species of grass-like plant

Carex oligocarpa, common name richwoods sedge, eastern few-fruited sedge, few-fruit sedge, and few-fruited sedge is a Carex species that is native to North America. It is a perennial.

== Conservation status in the United States ==
It is endangered in New Jersey and Vermont, threatened in Michigan, and a species of special concern in Connecticut.
