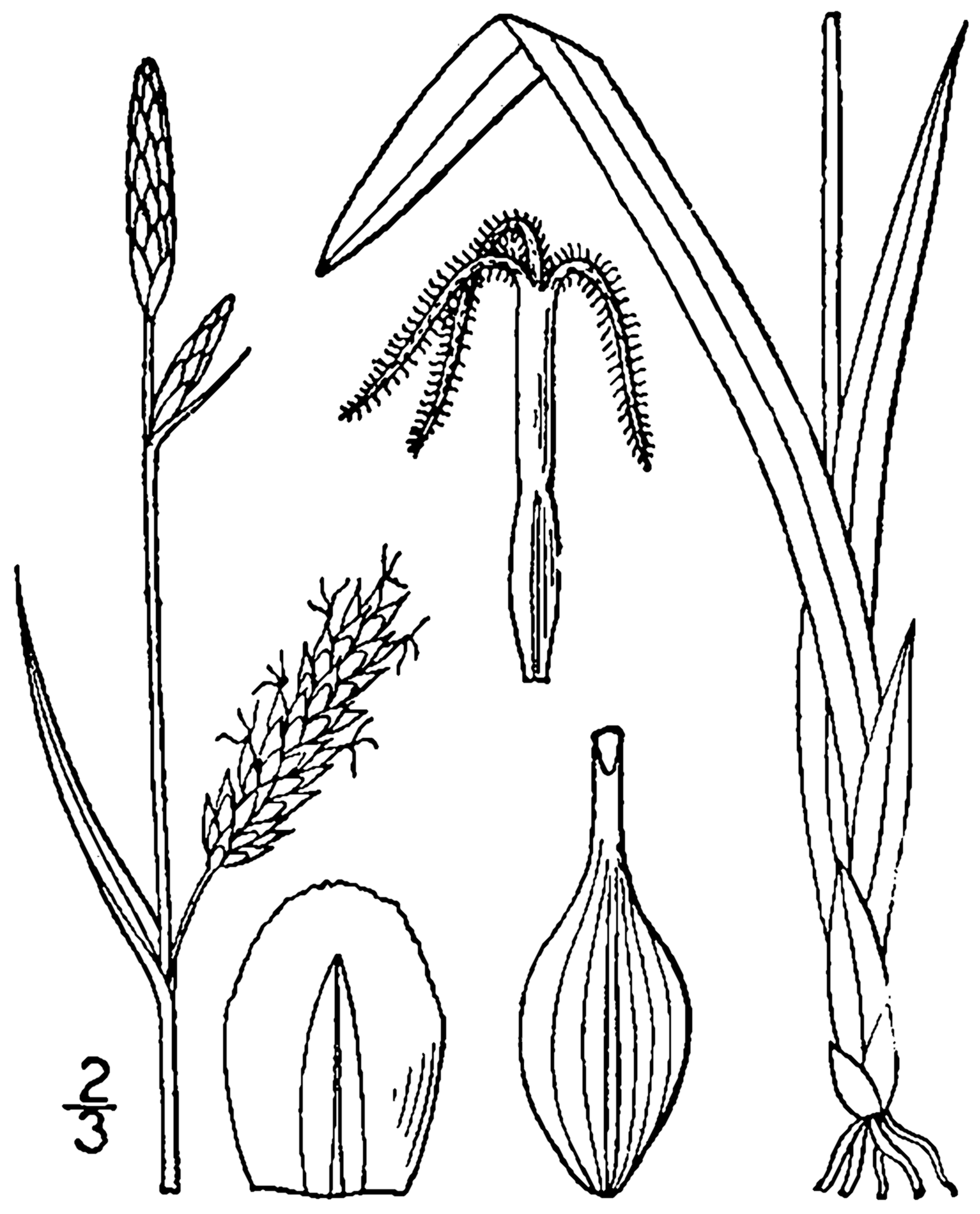
- 1913 botanical illustration.

Scientific classification
- Kingdom: Plantae
- Clade: Tracheophytes
- Clade: Angiosperms
- Clade: Monocots
- Clade: Commelinids
- Order: Poales
- Family: Cyperaceae
- Genus: Carex
- Species: C. polymorpha

Binomial name
- Carex polymorpha Muhl.

= Carex polymorpha =

Species of grass-like plant

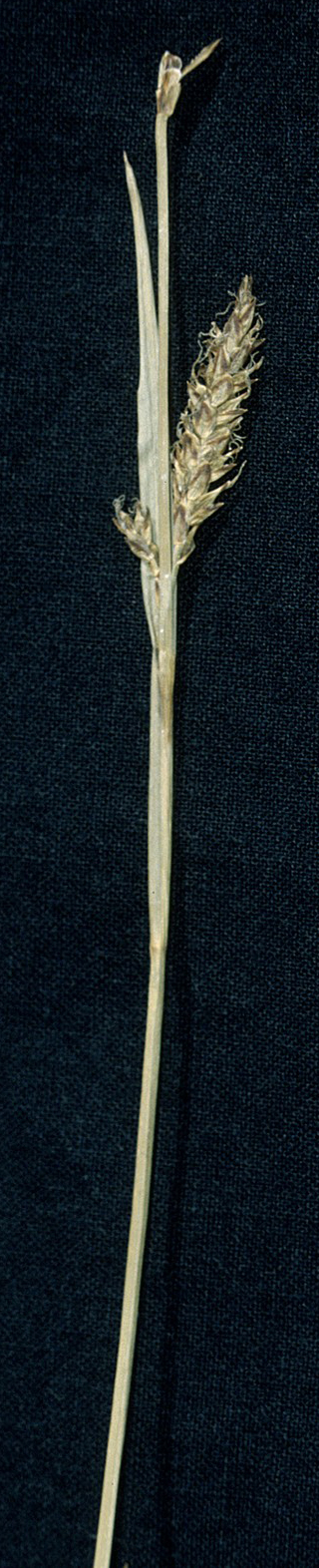
Carex polymorpha

Carex polymorpha common names variable sedge and many forms sedge, is a perennial species of Carex native to North America.

== Conservation status in the United States ==
It is listed as endangered in Connecticut, Maine, Massachusetts, New Jersey, Rhode Island, and Virginia. It is listed as endangered and extirpated in Maryland, and as threatened in New Hampshire and Pennsylvania.
