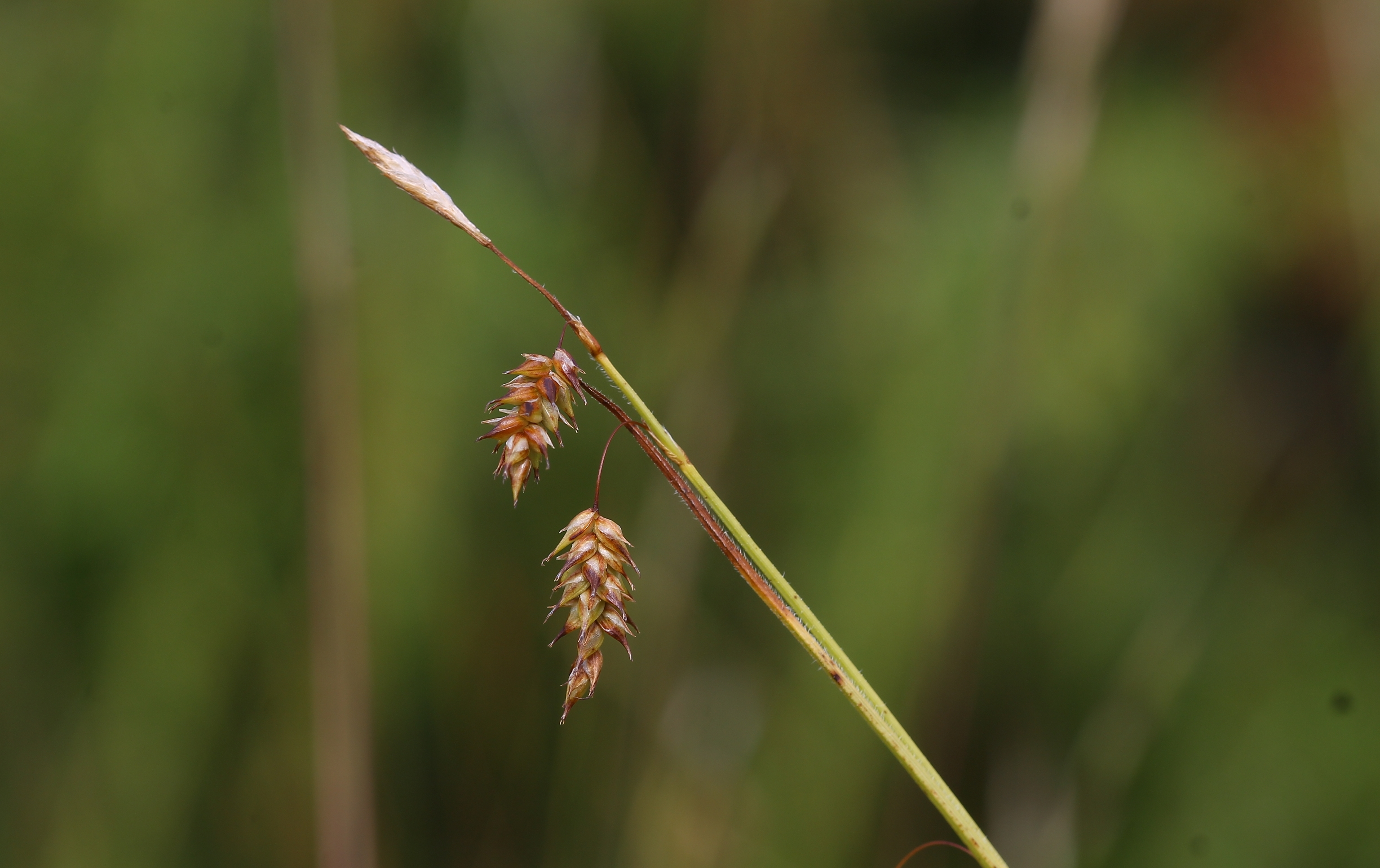

Scientific classification
- Kingdom: Plantae
- Clade: Tracheophytes
- Clade: Angiosperms
- Clade: Monocots
- Clade: Commelinids
- Order: Poales
- Family: Cyperaceae
- Genus: Carex
- Section: Carex sect. Hymenochlaenae
- Species: C. castanea

Binomial name
- Carex castanea Wahlenb.

= Carex castanea =

Species of grass-like plant

Carex castanea, commonly known as chestnut sedge, is a species of flowering plant in the sedge family (Cyperaceae) native to North America. It is listed as endangered in Connecticut, Massachusetts, and New Hampshire. Its range extends from Manitoba to the eastern seaboard in Canada and from Minnesota to New England in the United States. It is also sometimes called chestnut woodland sedge or chestnut-colored sedge.
