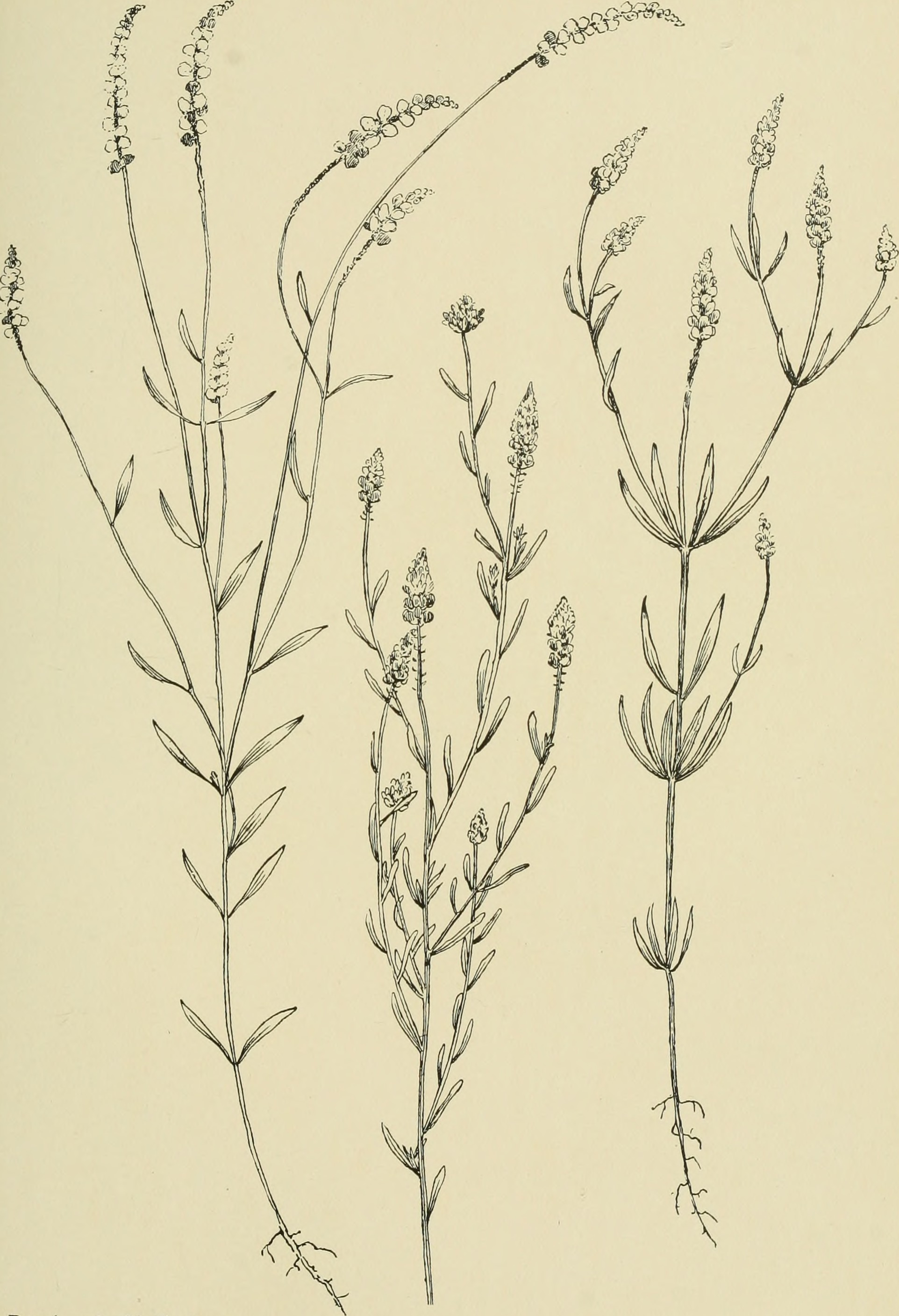

Scientific classification
- Kingdom: Plantae
- Clade: Embryophytes
- Clade: Tracheophytes
- Clade: Spermatophytes
- Clade: Angiosperms
- Clade: Eudicots
- Clade: Rosids
- Order: Fabales
- Family: Polygalaceae
- Genus: Senega
- Species: S. nuttallii

Binomial name
- Senega nuttallii (Torr. & A.Gray) J.F.B.Pastore & J.R.Abbott

Synonyms
- Polygala ambigua Torr. & A.Gray; Polygala nuttallii Torr. & A.Gray; Polygala linifolia Scheele; Polygala sanguinea Nutt.; Polygala torreyi Chodat

= Senega nuttallii =

Species of flowering plant

Senega nuttallii is a species of flowering plant in the milkwort family (Polygalaceae). It is endemic to the United States.
