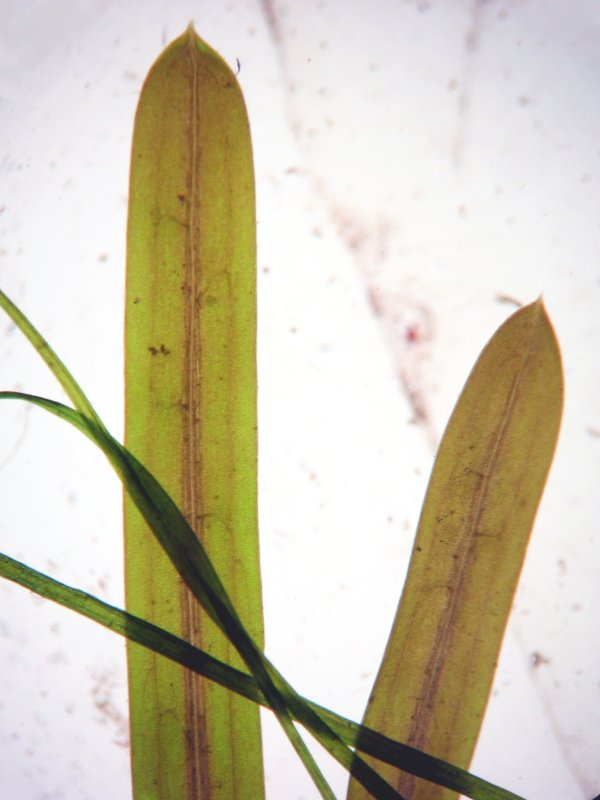

Conservation status
- Least Concern (IUCN 3.1)

Scientific classification
- Kingdom: Plantae
- Clade: Tracheophytes
- Clade: Angiosperms
- Clade: Monocots
- Order: Alismatales
- Family: Potamogetonaceae
- Genus: Potamogeton
- Species: P. friesii

Binomial name
- Potamogeton friesii Rupr.

Synonyms
- Potamogeton acutifolius J.Presl. & C. Presl.; Potamogeton major Morong; Potamogeton mucronatus Schrad. ex Sond.; Potamogeton oederi G.Mey.; Potamogeton pusillus subsp. friesii(Rupr.) Hook.f.; Spirillus friesii (Rupr.) Nieuwl.

= Potamogeton friesii =

Species of aquatic plant

Potamogeton friesii, known as flat-stalked pondweed, or Fries' pondweed, is an aquatic plant in the genus Potamogeton. It grows mainly in mesotrophic to eutrophic rivers, lakes, ponds and ditches, rarely in brackish water. It occurs in North America, Europe, western Asia and a few scattered locations elsewhere in Asia.

== Description ==
Flat-stalked pondweed grows annually from turions and seed, producing branching plants with slender, flattened stems that are well-branched. The submerged leaves are long, rather grass-like, sessile, and translucent. The leaf tips are mucronate (i.e. with the midrib extending out of the leaf, giving a pointed appearance). Abundant turions are produced along the stem, especially in autumn as the plant disintegrates.

Flat-stalked pondweed could be confused with other fine-leaved pondweeds within its range, especially Potamogeton obtusifolius but potentially also P. pusillus. The combination of open stipules, rounded tips to the leaves, dense flower spikes and a tendency to produce a mass of bushy growth at the surface all help to distinguish this plant, but use of a botanical key or flora is recommended.

Potamogeton friesii is diploid, with 2n=26.

Two hybrids of Potamogeton friesii have been described, with P. crispus (P. × lintonii Fryer) and P. acutifolius (P. × pseudofriesii Dandy & G.Taylor).

== Taxonomy ==
Flat-stalked pondweed was first described in 1847 by the Austrian botanist Franz Josef Ruprecht. The specific name friesii commemorates the Swedish mycologist and botanist Elias Magnus Fries. It is related to other fine-leaved pondweeds such as P. obtusifolius, P. foliosus and P. pusillus.

== Distribution ==
Potamogeton friesii occurs predominantly in North America (Canada, northern USA), Europe (Scandinavia, Germany, Poland, British Isles, NE and central France, Belarus, Ukraine, European Russia, Pyrenees, Carpathians), There are isolated populations in southern Europe (Corsica, N Italy, Balkans) and in Asia (N China, Russia, Japan, Kazakhstan, Tajikistan).

== Ecology and conservation ==
In Britain, P. friesii occurs in a range of standing water habitats including ponds, ditches, canals, sluggish rivers and shallow lakes, favouring calcareous waters. It is strictly a lowland plant and is tolerant of eutrophication, especially in rivers. Like other fine-leaved pondweeds, P. friesii probably benefits from a certain amount of disturbance to suppress competing vegetation.

Flat-stalked pondweed has suffered local declines and is thought to be extinct in the Czech Republic, and is Endangered in Switzerland, and Germany. It is considered to have declined in Britain, but is still widespread, and was listed as Near Threatened in 2002. A more recent assessment for England only reassessed its status as Vulnerable, reflecting ongoing population declines. However, in the Netherlands it is considered least concern.

== Cultivation ==
Flat-stalked pondweed is not presently in cultivation. Although its wide ecological tolerance suggests it may not be difficult to grow, it would probably require a deeper substrate than is usual in most ornamental ponds. It is also likely to compete poorly with other pond plants.
