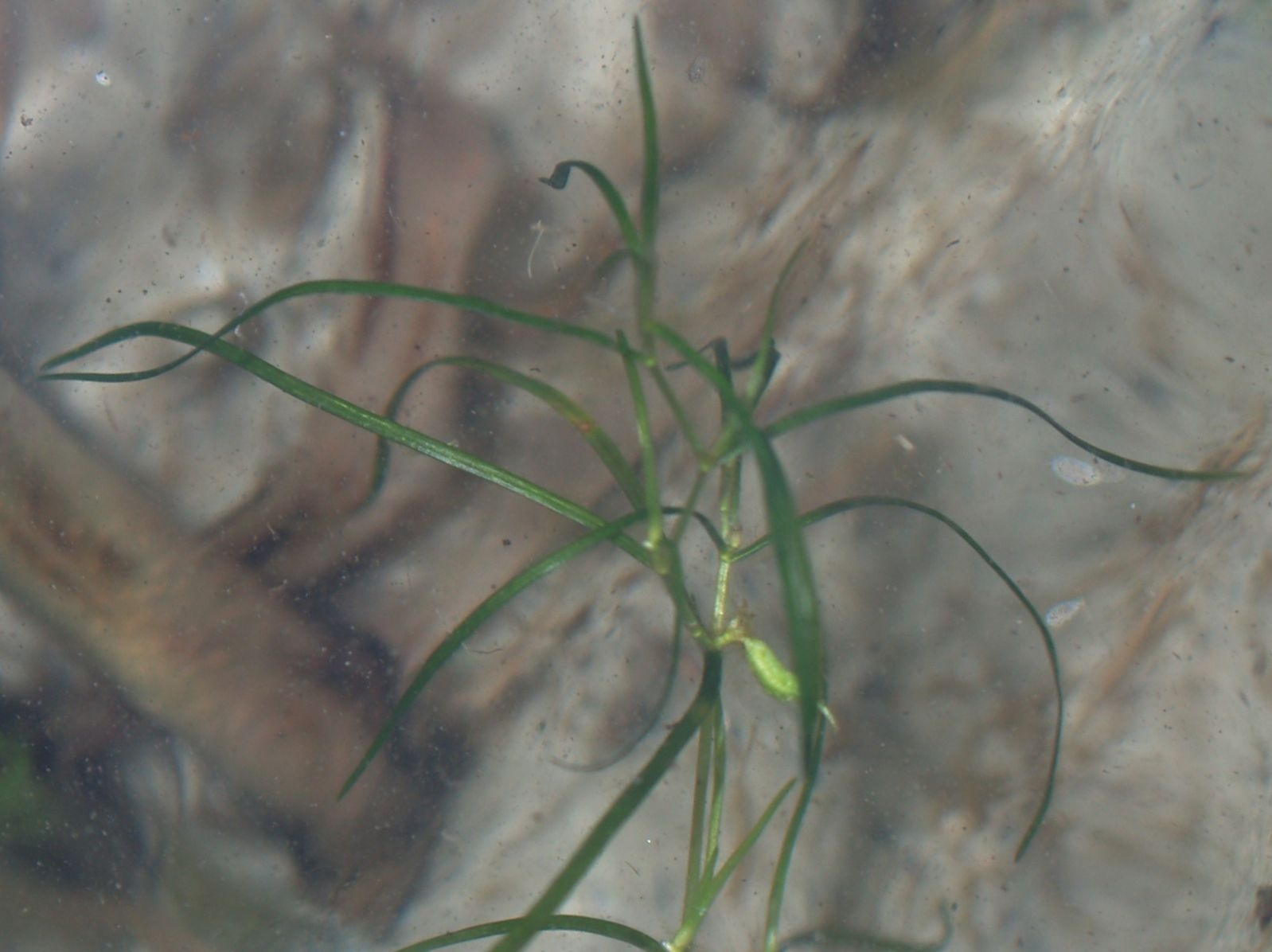

Scientific classification
- Kingdom: Plantae
- Clade: Tracheophytes
- Clade: Angiosperms
- Clade: Monocots
- Order: Alismatales
- Family: Potamogetonaceae
- Genus: Zannichellia
- Species: Z. palustris
- Subspecies: Z. p. subsp. major

Trinomial name
- Zannichellia palustris subsp. major (Hartm.) Ooststr. & Reichg.

= Zannichellia palustris subsp. major =

Subspecies of flowering plant

Zannichellia palustris subsp. major, the greater horned pondweed is an aquatic plant found in fresh to brackish waters in Europe.
