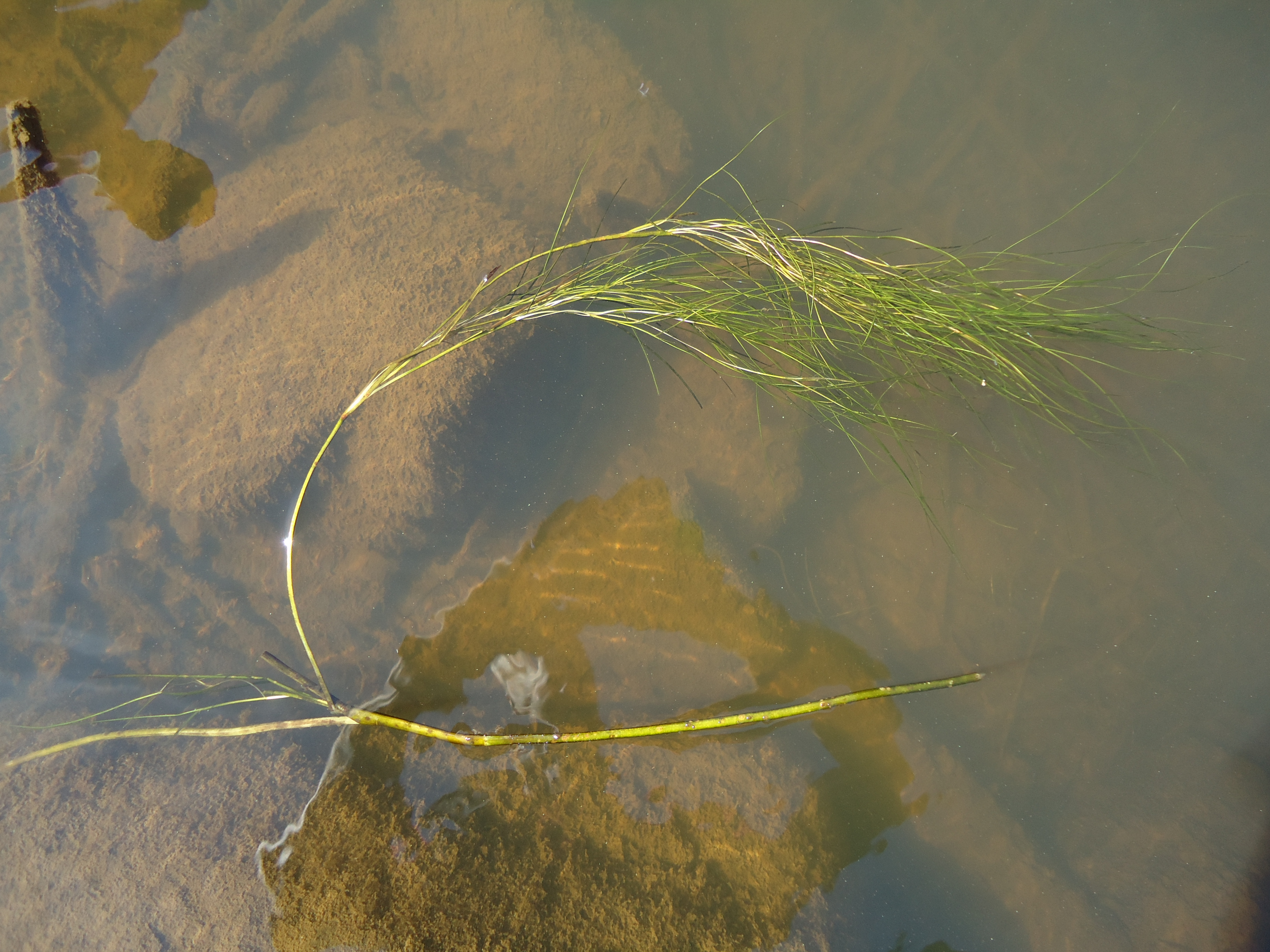

Scientific classification
- Kingdom: Plantae
- Clade: Tracheophytes
- Clade: Angiosperms
- Clade: Monocots
- Order: Alismatales
- Family: Potamogetonaceae
- Genus: Stuckenia
- Species: S. vaginata

Binomial name
- Stuckenia vaginata (Turcz.) Holub

Synonyms
- Potamogeton vaginatus Turcz.

= Stuckenia vaginata =

Species of aquatic plant

Stuckenia vaginata (syn. Potamogeton vaginatus), commonly called sheathed pondweed, big sheathed pondweed or large-sheathed pondweed is a water plant species that grows in fresh and brackish water in Europe, Northern Asia (excluding China) and North America. Sheathed pondweed is rare, but is not in the 2012 IUCN Red List.

Stuckenia vaginata is a fully submerged aquatic plant and does not have any floating or emerged leaves.

The flowers are wind pollinated and the seeds float. Tubers that are rich in starch are formed on the rhizomes. Reproduction can either be vegetative with tubers and plant fragments or sexual with seeds.

== Description ==
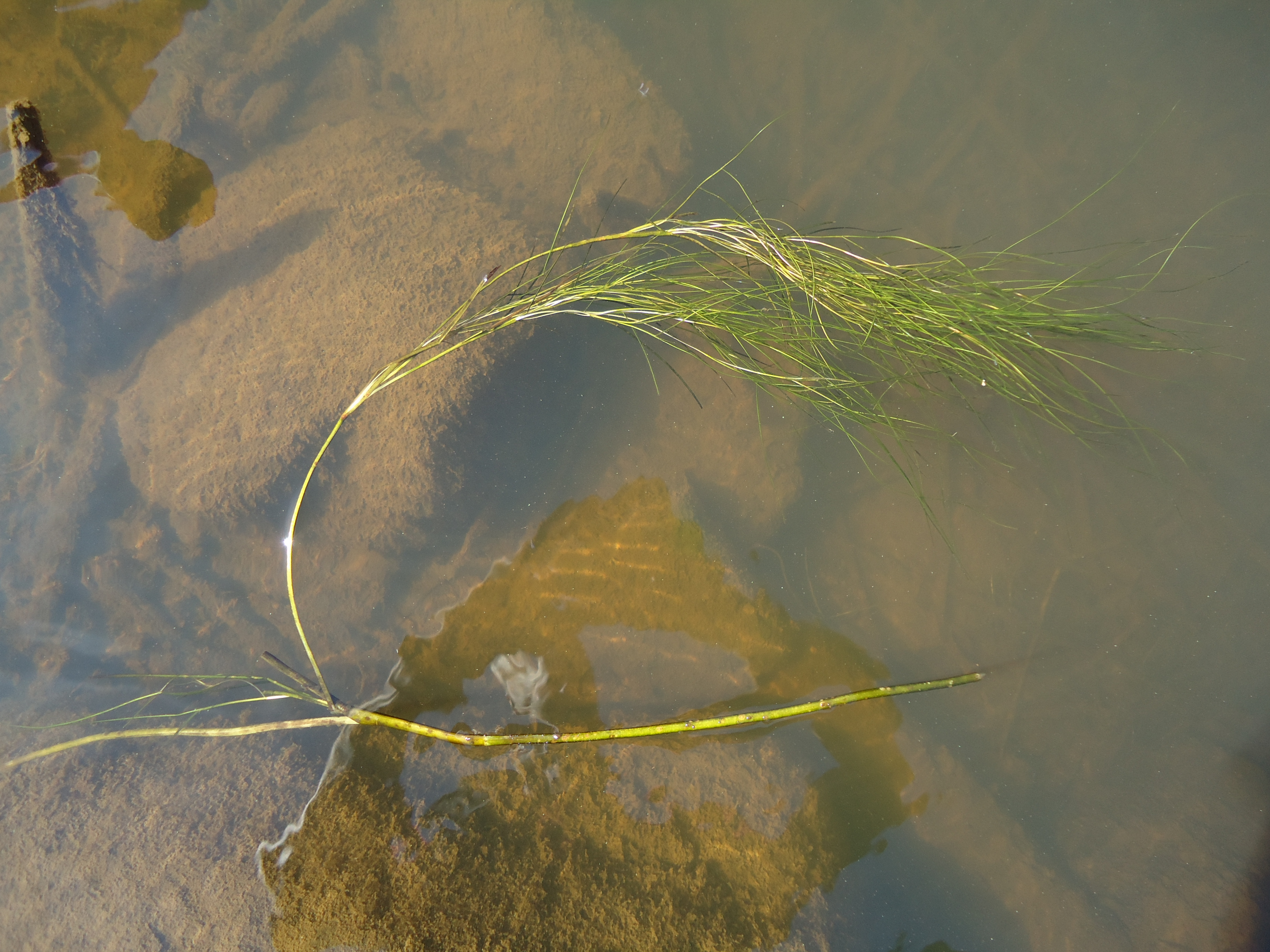

The main difference between Stuckenia and Potamogeton is that the stipule joins the leaf base; when it is pulled the sheath and stipule comes away, similar to a grass sheath and ligule. Stuckenia vaginata is 1–4 metres long and has longer stipule sheaths than e.g. Stuckenia pecinata and Stuckenia filiformis. Similar to them, it has long narrow linear leaves.
