= Pondweed =

List of plants with the same or similar names

Pondweed refers to many species and genera of aquatic plants and green algae:

- Potamogeton, a diverse and worldwide genus
- Elodea, found in North America
- Aponogeton, in Africa, Asia and Australasia
- Groenlandia, a genus of aquatic plants
- Stuckenia, a genus of aquatic plants
- Charales, an order of green algae
