= Althenia cylindrocarpa =

Scientific classification
- Kingdom: Plantae
- Clade: Embryophytes
- Clade: Tracheophytes
- Clade: Angiosperms
- Clade: Monocots
- Order: Alismatales
- Family: Potamogetonaceae
- Genus: Althenia
- Species: A. cylindrocarpa

Binomial name
- Althenia cylindrocarpa (Körn. ex Müll.Berol.) Asch.

Synonyms
- Lepilaena cylindrocarpa (Körn. ex Müll.Berol.) Benth. Zannichellia cylindrocarpa Körn. ex Müll.Berol.

Species of aquatic plant

Althenia cylindrocarpa is a species of aquatic plant in the family Potamogetonaceae. It is found in fresh to brackish waters in Australia. This species has been transferred from Lepilaena.
