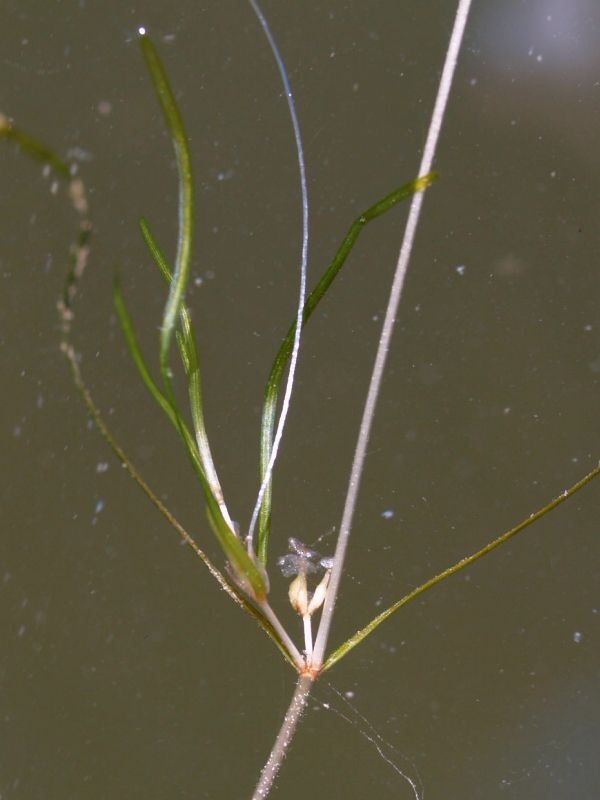

Scientific classification
- Kingdom: Plantae
- Clade: Tracheophytes
- Clade: Angiosperms
- Clade: Monocots
- Order: Alismatales
- Family: Potamogetonaceae
- Genus: Zannichellia
- Species: Z. obtusifolia

Binomial name
- Zannichellia obtusifolia Talavera, García-Mur. & H.Smit

= Zannichellia obtusifolia =

Species of flowering plant

Zannichellia obtusifolia is a plant found in fresh to brackish waters in the Mediterranean.
