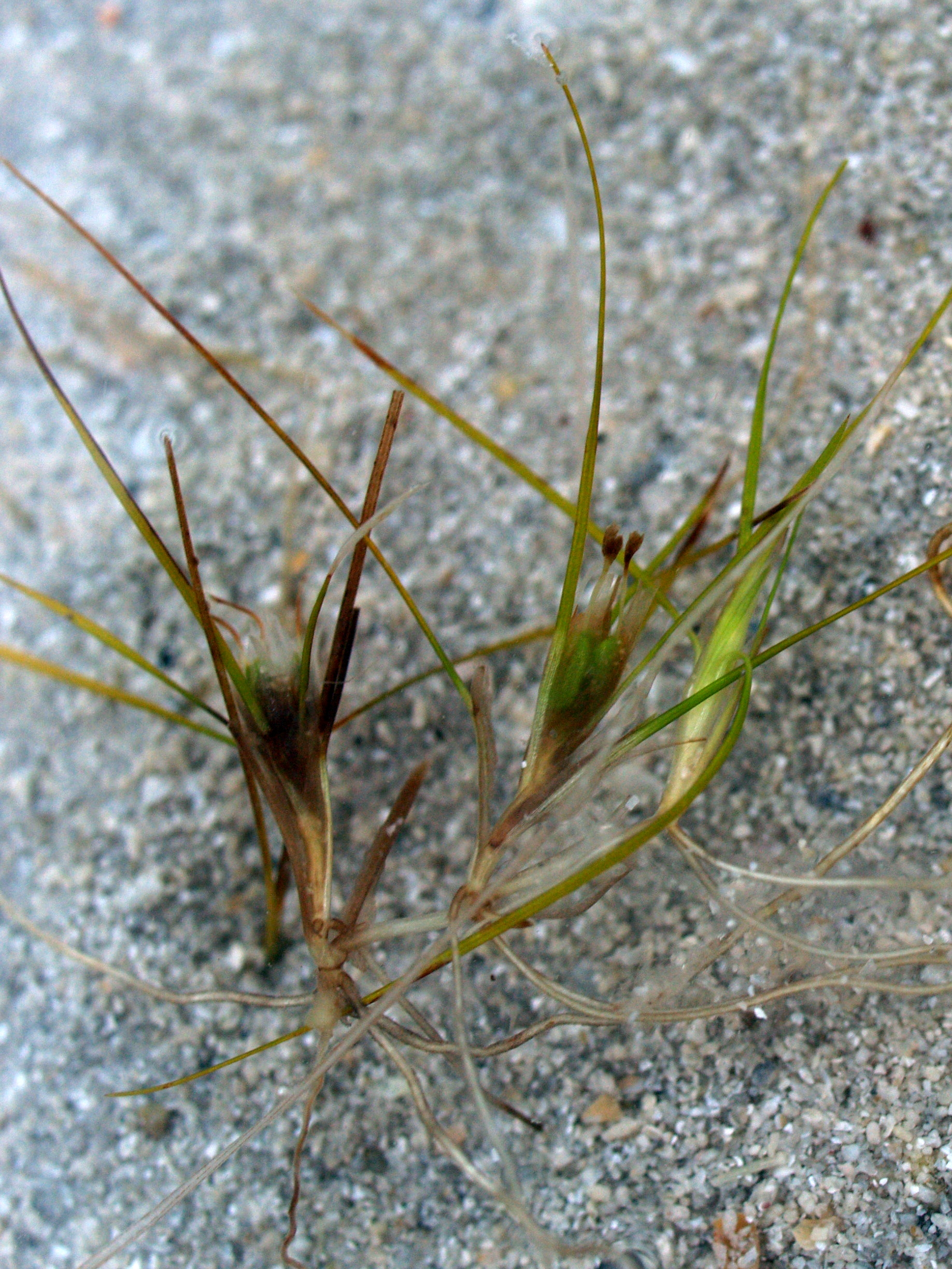

Scientific classification
- Kingdom: Plantae
- Clade: Embryophytes
- Clade: Tracheophytes
- Clade: Angiosperms
- Clade: Monocots
- Order: Alismatales
- Family: Potamogetonaceae
- Genus: Althenia
- Species: A. preissii

Binomial name
- Althenia preissii (Lehm.) Asch. & Graebn.

Synonyms
- Hexatheca preissii Sond. ex F.Muell. Lepilaena preissii (Lehm.) F.Muell. Zannichellia preissii Lehm.

= Althenia preissii =

Species of aquatic plant

Althenia preissii is a plant found in fresh to brackish waters in Australia. This species has been transferred from the genus Lepilaena.
