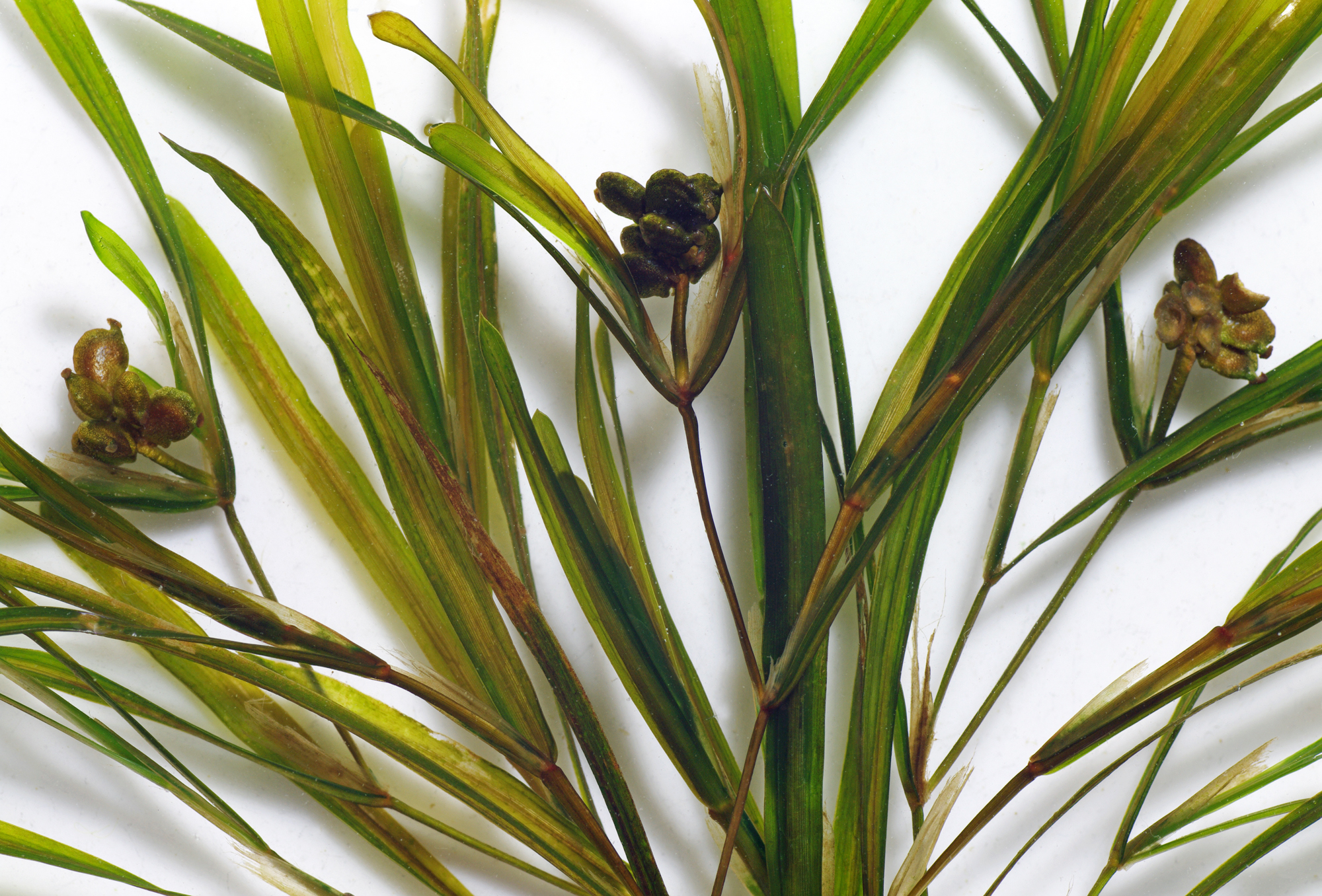
- Potamogeton acutifolius (detail)

Scientific classification
- Kingdom: Plantae
- Clade: Tracheophytes
- Clade: Angiosperms
- Clade: Monocots
- Order: Alismatales
- Family: Potamogetonaceae
- Genus: Potamogeton
- Species: P. acutifolius

Binomial name
- Potamogeton acutifolius Link, 1818

Synonyms
- Potamogeton bambergensis G.Fisch.; Potamogeton carinatus Kupffer; Potamogeton cuspidatus Schrad.; Potamogeton henningii A.Benn.; Potamogeton laticaulis Wahlenb.

= Potamogeton acutifolius =

Species of plant

Potamogeton acutifolius is a European species of aquatic plant in the family Potamogetonaceae, known by the common name sharp-leaved pondweed. It is threatened and declining in at least part of its range.

== Description ==
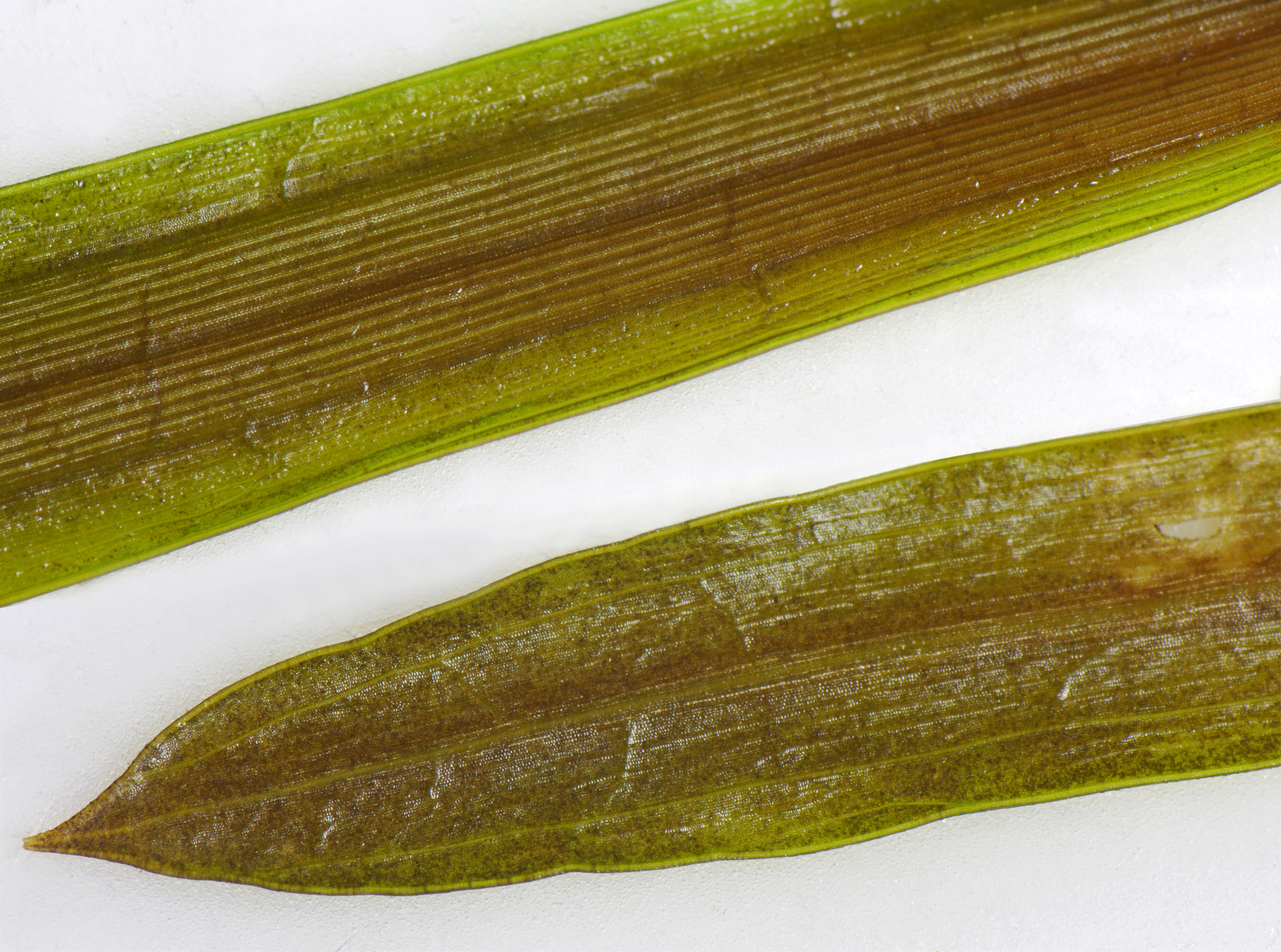
Leaves of sharp-leaved pondweed (actual width 3–3.5 mm). Note the opaque appearance due to the sclerenchymatous strands.

Sharp-leaved pondweed grows annually from turions and seed, producing rather lax plants branching near the surface with strongly compressed stems and long, rather grass-like leaves that are 35–100 mm long and 1.5–5 mm wide and dark green, often with a marked reddish or brownish tinge. Each leaf has one vein either side of the midrib. There are no rhizomes or floating leaves.

The inflorescences are up to 6 mm long with 4-6 flowers with a short peduncle (5–20 mm long, occasionally more).

Within its range, sharp-leaved pondweed is relatively easily identified from all other pondweeds except the closely related grass-wrack pondweed (P. compressus) by its combination of strongly flattened stems, sclerenchymatous strands in the leaf (giving the submerged leaves an opaque appearance compared with the transparent appearance of other pondweeds) and leaves with sharply pointed (acute) tips. Grass-wrack pondweed differs in having blunter tips to the leaves, leaves with 2 veins either side of the midrib, and infloresecences with 10–20 flowers on long peduncles, 28–95 mm long.

Hybrids with P. berchtoldii (P. × sudermanicus Hagstr.) and P. friesii (P. × pseudofriesii Dandy & G.Taylor) have been recorded. Both are rare. In northeast Europe, DNA evidence indicates that hybrids with P. compressus are fairly frequent, but often overlooked because of the difficulty of reliably identifying them.

== Taxonomy ==
Potamogeton acutifolius was described in 1815 by the German botanist Johann Link. The specific epithet, acutifolius, meaning "acute leaved", is derived from Latin acutus (pointed, acute), and -folius (-leaved), referring to the pointed leaf tips.

Within the genus Potamogeton, Sharp-leaved pondweed is within the Section Graminifolii (fine-leaved pondweeds). It is closely related to P. compressus, P. zosterifolius and P. mandschuriensis, all of which also have sclerenchymatous strands.

== Distribution ==
Potamogeton acutifolius is native to Europe, including the UK, Czech Republic, Balkans and Denmark. In Britain it has always been rather rare and now has a very restricted distribution to suitable habitat in south-east England.

== Ecology and conservation ==
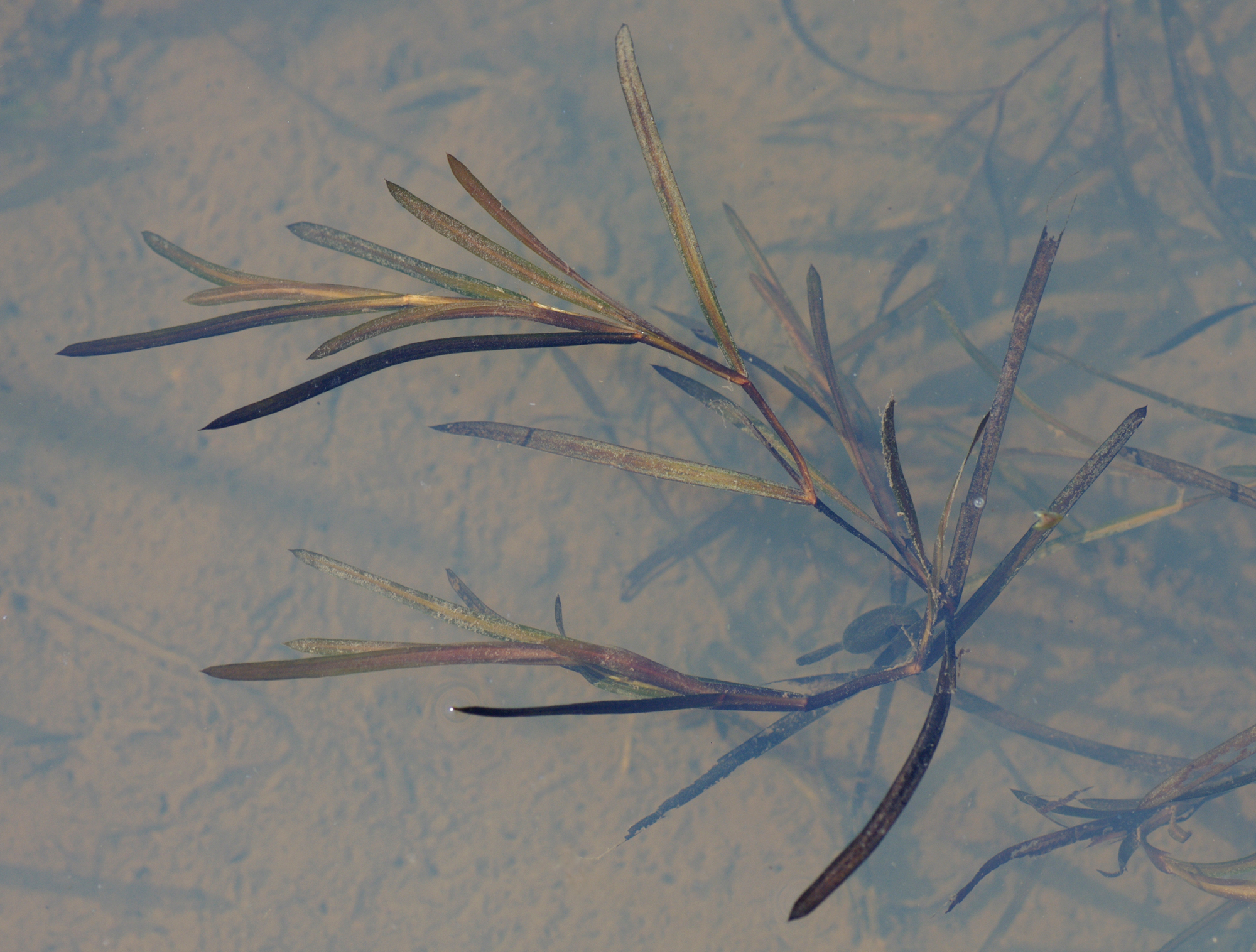
Sharp-leaved pondweed in a pond in Lower Saxony (Germany)

In Britain, P. acutifolius is almost exclusively restricted to shallow, circumneutral, species-rich ditches on lowland grazing marshes, often with fairly high conductivity. Although there are some fairly strong populations remaining in Britain, these are vulnerable to changes in farming practice, pollution and sea level rise. As ditch systems are an artificial habitat type, sharp-leaved pondweed presumably relied on a now destroyed habitat in Britain, a possible candidate being natural lowland river-floodplain wetland areas, which could create disturbed areas for this plant to exploit. Alternatively, it may have been associated with a now extinct species such as beaver.

Sharp-leaved pondweed has declined markedly in both Britain and Denmark. On the British and Swiss Red Lists for Vascular Plants it is listed as Critically Endangered and it is a UK Biodiversity Action Plan priority species. It is classed as Vulnerable in the Czech Republic and Germany. In Flanders it is classed as Rare and in the Netherlands it is Near Threatened.

== Cultivation ==
Potamogeton acutifolius is not in general cultivation, and its rarity suggests that it may be difficult to cultivate. It would need to be grown in rather silty, nutrient-rich ponds that are regularly cleaned out in order to suppress competing vegetation.
