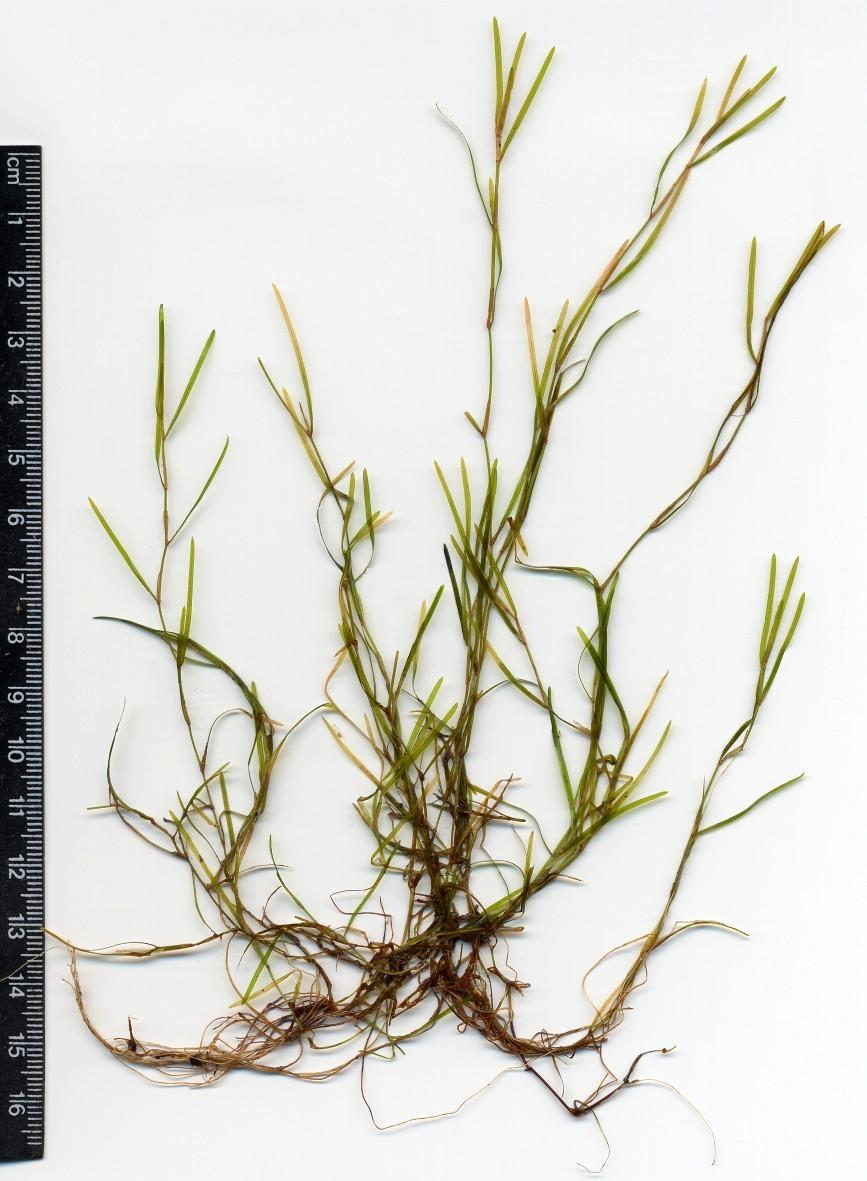
- Herbarium specimen from Lower Saxony, Germany

Conservation status
- Least Concern (IUCN 3.1)

Scientific classification
- Kingdom: Plantae
- Clade: Tracheophytes
- Clade: Angiosperms
- Clade: Monocots
- Order: Alismatales
- Family: Potamogetonaceae
- Genus: Potamogeton
- Species: P. pusillus

Binomial name
- Potamogeton pusillus L.

Synonyms
- Synonymy: Buccaferrea pusilla (L.) Bubani; Potamogeton aschersonii A.Benn.; Potamogeton badius Hagstr.; Potamogeton berteroanus Phil.; Potamogeton caespitosus Humn.; Potamogeton compressus var. elongatus Wahlenb.; Potamogeton denticulatus Link; Potamogeton dualis Hagstr.; Potamogeton exiguus Hagstr.; Potamogeton gracilis Fr.; Potamogeton lateralis Morong; Potamogeton millardii Hesl.-Harr.; Potamogeton panormitanus Biv.; Potamogeton pusilliformis Hagstr.; Potamogeton reichenbachii M.Loehr ex. Beurl.; Potamogeton rutilus (Humn.) Nyman; Potamogeton sturrockii A.Benn.; Potamogeton subjavanicus Hagstr.; Potamogeton subtrichodes Schur; Potamogeton tenuifolius F.Phil.; Potamogeton tenuissimus M.Loehr ex Beurl.; Potamogeton tenuissimus Hook.f.; Potamogeton tenuissimus (Mert. & W.D.J.Koch) Rchb; Potamogeton trichoides Benth.; Potamogeton trinervius G.Fisch.; Potamogeton turionifer Hagstr.; Spirillus pusillus (L.) Nieuwl.

= Potamogeton pusillus =

Species of aquatic plant

Potamogeton pusillus is a species of aquatic plant known by the common names small pondweed, lesser pondweed or least pondweed. It occurs in standing and slow-flowing freshwater habitats throughout the Northern Hemisphere.

== Description ==
Lesser pondweed is a superficially grasslike herb producing a very slender, branching, somewhat compressed stem, usually less than 70 cm but occasionally up to one metre in length. Nodal glands, if present, are generally poorly developed. The leaves are narrow and linear, translucent, mid or olive green, usually 20–50 mm long × 0.8–1.4 mm wide, but rarely up to 100 mm long and 1.9 mm wide. The midrib often lacks lacunae (transparent areas either side of the midrib) either side of it, and if present, lacunae are restricted to the lower half of the leaf. There are no floating leaves. The stipules are tubular when young, but tend to split with age.

Turions are produced, often in large quantities. In early autumn the entire plant disintegrates into a mass of turions, which act as a means of propagation and as an overwintering mechanism.

The inflorescence is a spike of 3–6 flowers arranged in interrupted whorls.

Like most fine-leaved pondweeds, Potamogeton pusillus is diploid, with 2n=26.

Lesser pondweed can be difficult to distinguish reliably from other fine-leaved pondweeds, especially P. berchtoldii. Hybrids are recorded with Potamogeton octandrus (P. × apertus Miki), P. polygonus (P. × attenuatus Hagstr.), P. obtusifolius (P. × saxonicus Hagstr.), P. trichoides (P. × grovesii Dandy & G.Taylor), P. berchtoldii (P. × mucronulatus (G.Fisch.) Papch.), P. oxyphyllus (P. × orientalis Hagstr.).

== Taxonomy ==
Lesser pondweed was one of several pondweeds first named by Linnaeus in his Species Plantarum (1753). The specific epithet pusillus means 'small'.

This is one of a group of rather similar fine-leaved species that also includes P. berchtoldii, P. hillii and P. ochreatus. These are quite morphologically variable plants, often with wide geographical and ecological ranges, which has resulted in a great deal of taxonomic confusion and an unusually large number of synonyms and invalid names (see the taxon box).

== Distribution ==
Lesser pondweed is widely distributed globally, occurring across most of Europe (including Scandinavia) and North America. It is reported from scattered locations in Central and Southeast Asia and is widespread in China. It is also widespread in South America and Africa.

== Ecology and conservation ==
Lesser pondweed grows in standing or slow-flowing water bodies such as ponds, lakes, ditches, slow-moving streams, and river backwaters. It is a lowland plant and requires calcareous water, with a marked preference for high nutrient levels, and may form extensive beds in favourable situations, growing with other nutrient-tolerant species such as Myriophyllum spicatum and Zannichellia palustris. It is tolerant of turbid water and is a good colonist, often exploiting temporary or disturbed habitats such as livestock drinking ponds, canals and ditches. In lakes it is very tolerant of eutrophication and the resulting competition from phytoplankton and periphyton, and is often one of the last submerged plants to disappear.

Globally, Potamogeton pusillus is listed as Least Concern.There is no evidence of local declines and in many areas it is probably increasing due to eutrophication of freshwater habitats. In many parts of its range it is the commonest fine-leaved pondweed.

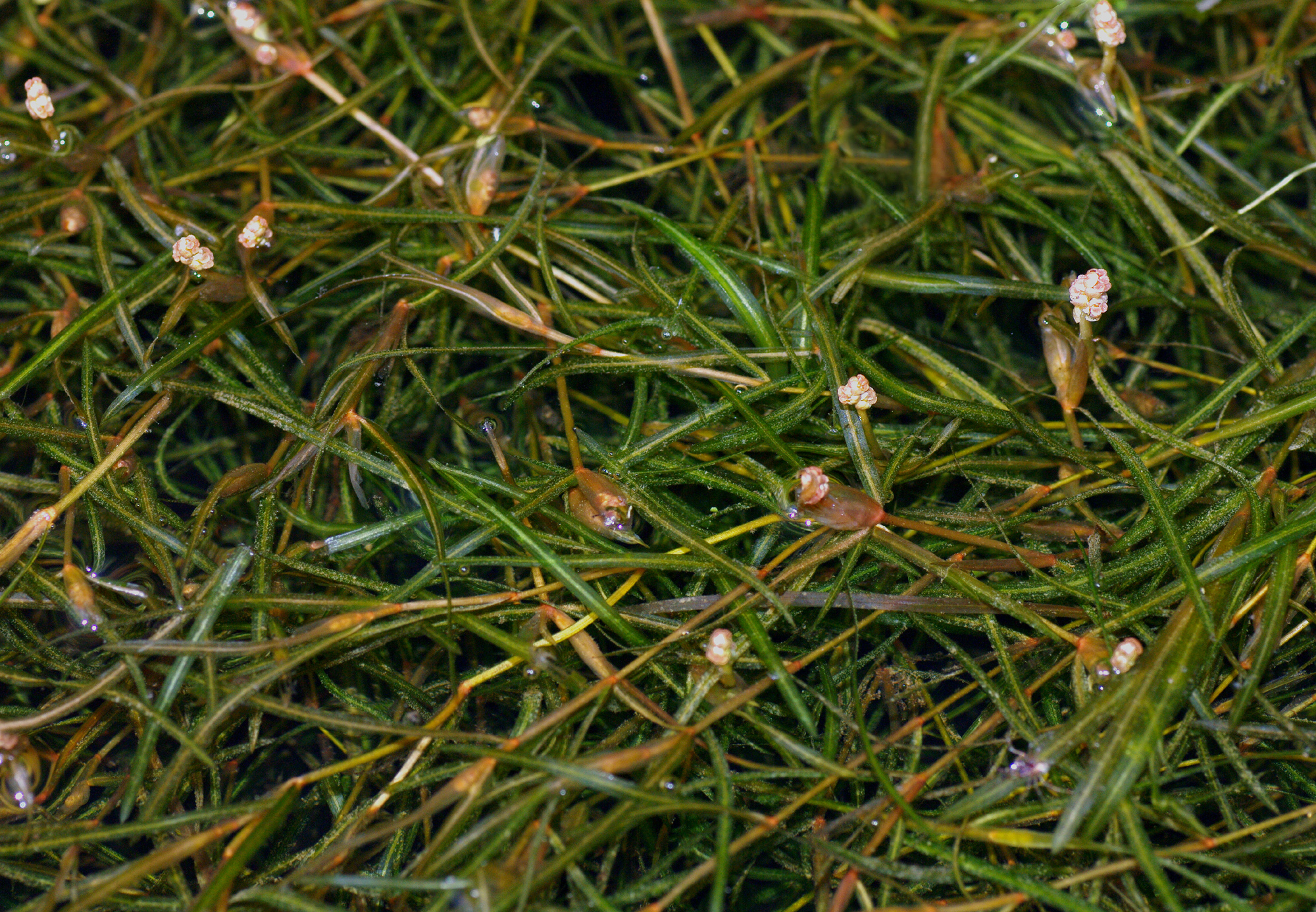
Flowering small pondweed in a ditch in Germany

== Cultivation ==
Lesser pondweed should not be difficult to grow in a garden pond and its tolerance of poor water quality would be advantageous. However, it is not very ornamental.
