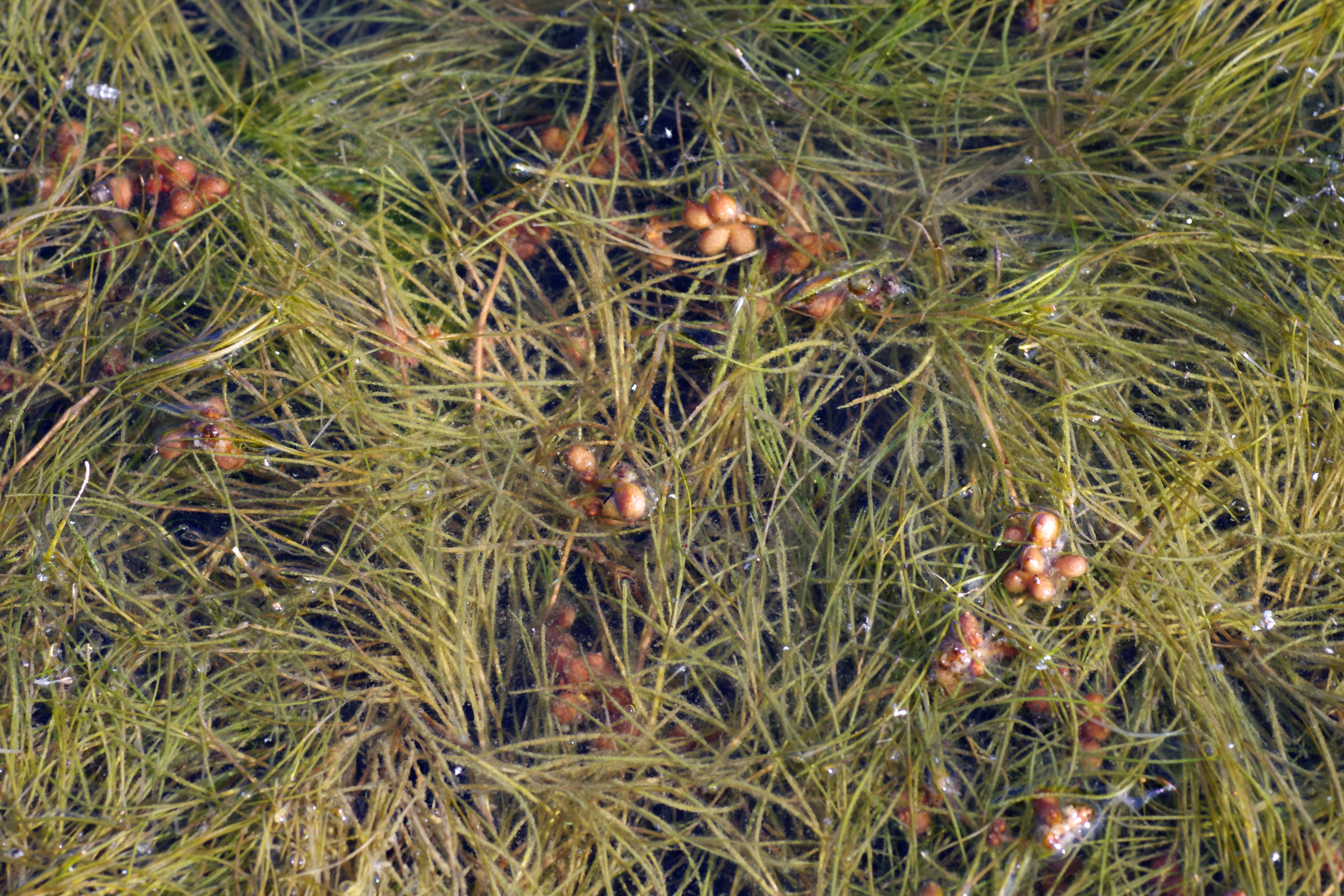

Conservation status
- Least Concern (IUCN 3.1)

Scientific classification
- Kingdom: Plantae
- Clade: Embryophytes
- Clade: Tracheophytes
- Clade: Spermatophytes
- Clade: Angiosperms
- Clade: Monocots
- Order: Alismatales
- Family: Potamogetonaceae
- Genus: Stuckenia
- Species: S. pectinata

Binomial name
- Stuckenia pectinata (L.) Börner

Synonyms
- Potamogeton pectinatus L.

= Stuckenia pectinata =

Species of aquatic plant

Stuckenia pectinata (syn. Potamogeton pectinatus), commonly called sago pondweed or fennel pondweed, and sometimes called ribbon weed, is a cosmopolitan water plant species that grows in fresh and brackish water on all continents except Antarctica.

== Description ==
Stuckenia pectinata has long narrow linear leaves which are less than 2 mm wide; each is composed of two slender, parallel tubes. It is a fully submerged aquatic plant and does not have any floating or emerged leaves.

The main difference from other narrow-leaved pondweeds is that the stipule joins the leaf base, when it is pulled the sheath and stipule comes away, similar to a grass sheath and ligule. The flowers are borne in solitary spike inflorescences with several clusters of flowers, up to six with interruptions along the peduncle. The fruits are 3 to 5 mm long.

The flowers are wind pollinated and the seeds float. Tubers that are rich in starch are formed on the rhizomes. Reproduction can either be vegetative with tubers and plant fragments or sexual with seeds.

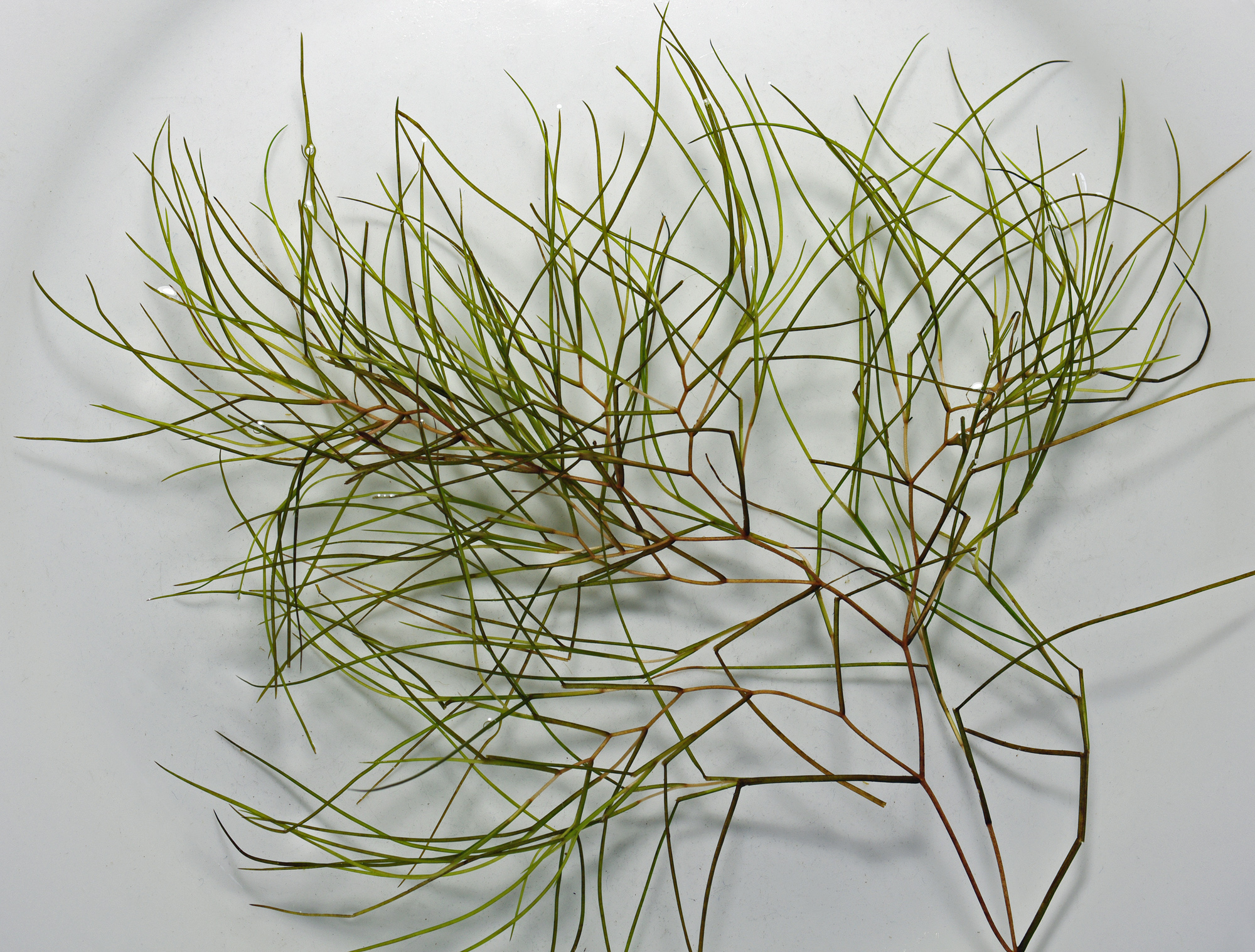
Leaves with the typical zigzag-formed stem

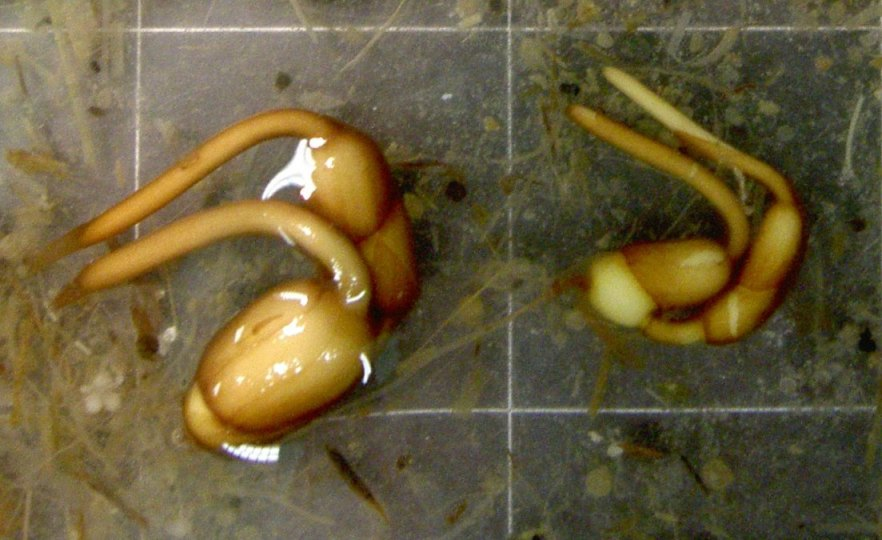
Tubers

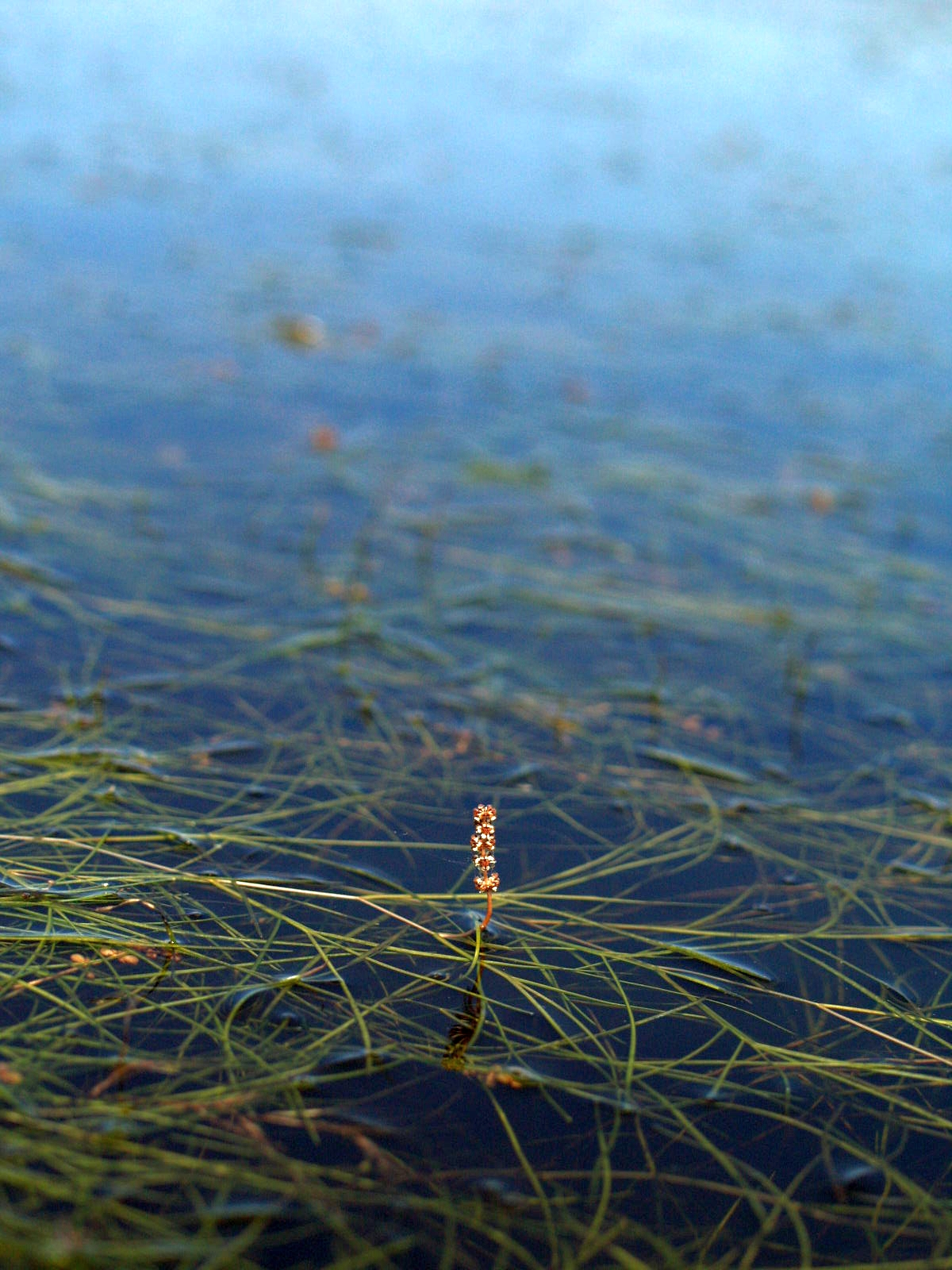
Inflorescence

== Ecology ==
The nutritious tubers are an important food source for waterfowl, including the canvasback, which help disperse the plant. Trumpeter swans and northern pintails feed mostly on the leaves and seeds of the plant.

A variety of insect larvae, including those of the Curculionidae (weevils), Trichoptera (caddisflies) and Crambidae (types of moth) are associated with this plant.

The plant can become a nuisance weed in waterways such as canals, because it is tolerant to eutrophication.
