= Althenia bilocularis =

Scientific classification
- Kingdom: Plantae
- Clade: Tracheophytes
- Clade: Angiosperms
- Clade: Monocots
- Order: Alismatales
- Family: Potamogetonaceae
- Genus: Althenia
- Species: A. bilocularis

Binomial name
- Althenia bilocularis (Kirk) Cockayne

Synonyms
- Lepilaena bilocularis Kirk

Species of flowering plant

Althenia bilocularis is a plant found in both Australia and New Zealand, in fresh to brackish waters. In Australia it is found in all mainland states with the exception of the Northern Territory. In New Zealand it is found on the North, South and Chatham Islands.

== Taxonomy ==
It was first described as Lepilaena bilocularis by Thomas Kirk in 1896. It was transferred to the genus, Althenia, in 1927 by Leonard Cockayne. This change by Cockayne is supported by DNA analyses.
