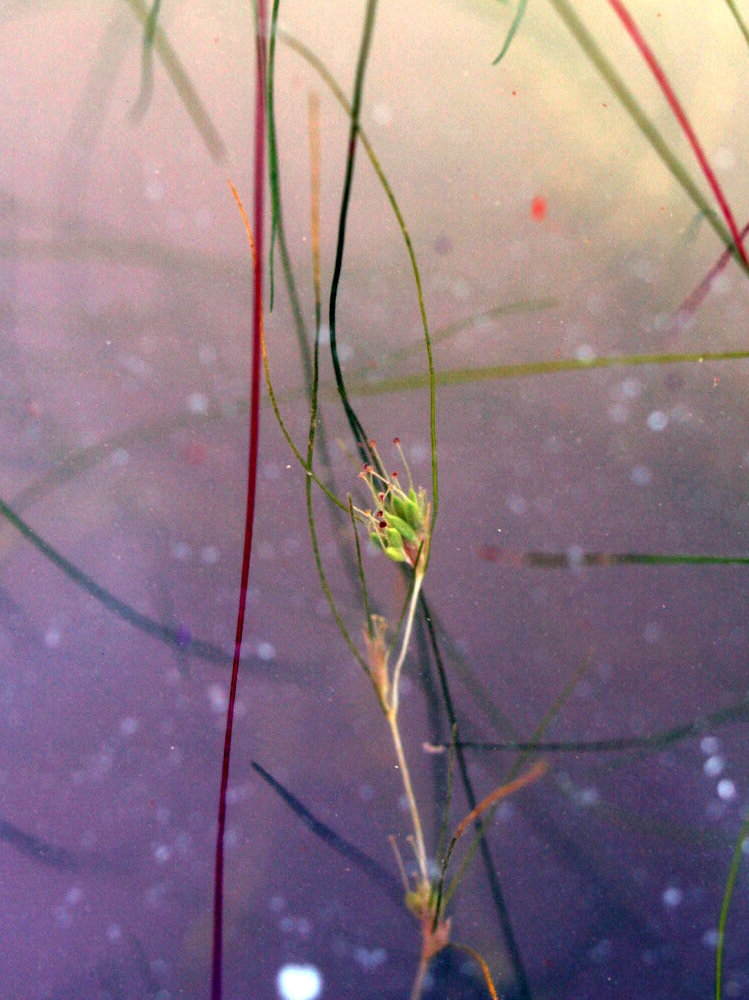
- Althenia filiformis

Scientific classification
- Kingdom: Plantae
- Clade: Tracheophytes
- Clade: Angiosperms
- Clade: Monocots
- Order: Alismatales
- Family: Potamogetonaceae
- Genus: Althenia; Petit

Species
- See text

Synonyms
- Lepilaena J.Drumm. ex W.H.Harvey

= Althenia =

Genus of aquatic plants

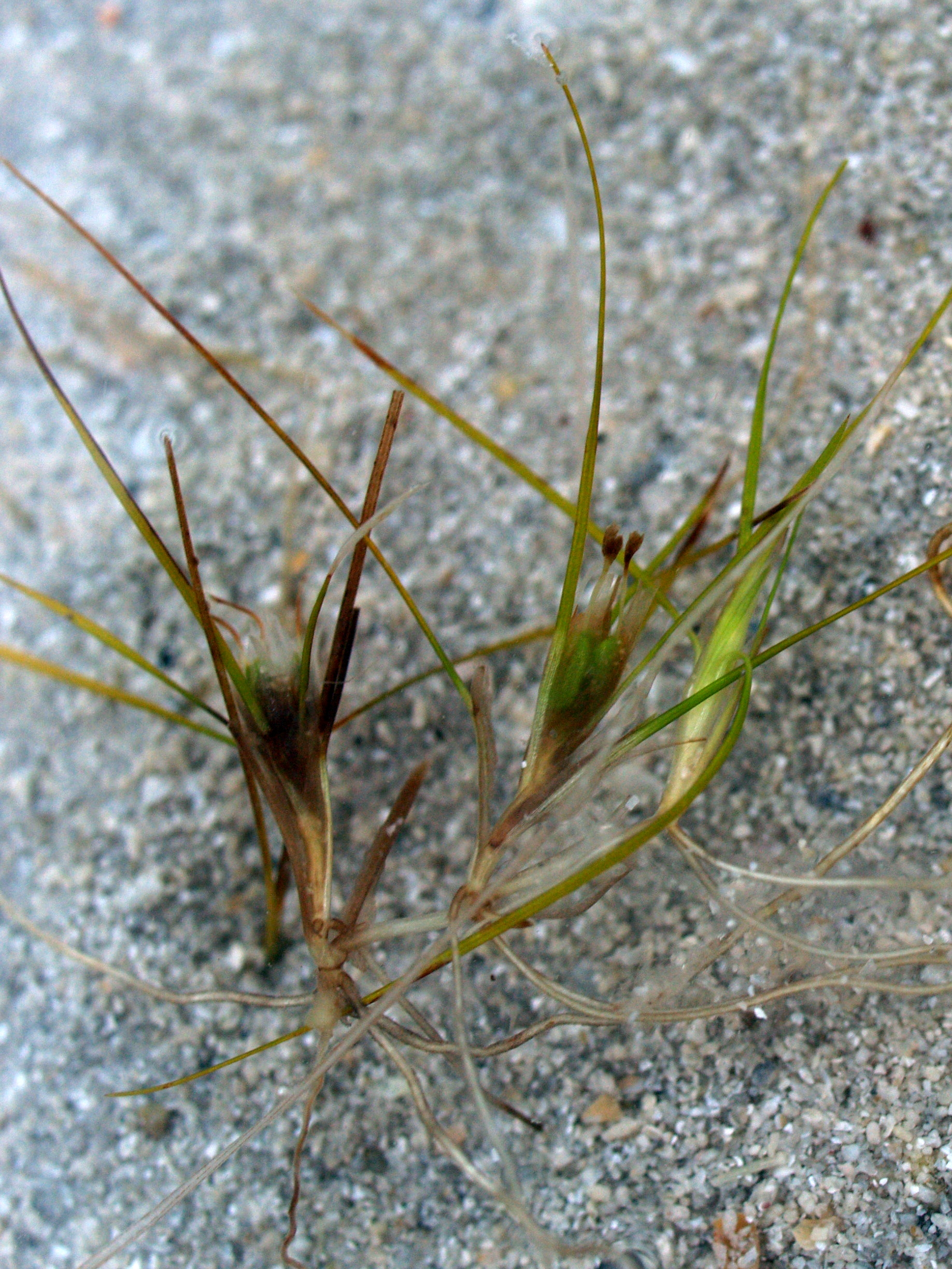
Lepilaena australis Harv., 1855

Althenia is a genus of aquatic plants of the family Potamogetonaceae. This has long been a group of two species in the Mediterranean Europe and South Africa, but in 2016 was revised to include an Australasian relative, Lepilaena. The genus is named after the agronomist Jean Althen.

== Description ==
This genus is made up of aquatic herbs. The bristle-like leaves are clustered at the nodes. The wider bases produce broad ligules.

The flowers are unisexual. The male flowers have a perianth made of three minute scales and have a single stamen.

The female flowers have a perianth made of one to three segments. The gynoecium has three carpels with a single pendulous ovule in each ovary. The filiform styles gradually pass into the carpels and the stigmas are large and oblique. The mature carpels are oblique and compressed with a winged or thickened margin. The seeds are pendulous, oblong and compressed. The embryo is straight.

== Species ==
- Althenia australis (aquatic)
- Althenia bilocularis (aquatic)
- Althenia cylindrocarpa (brackish water, marine)
- Althenia filiformis
- Althenia hearnii
- Althenia marina (marine)
- Althenia orientalis
- Althenia patentifolia
- Althenia preissii (aquatic)
- Althenia tzvelevii

== Lepilaena ==
Lepilaena was a genus of aquatic and marine flowering plant comprising 6 or more species endemic to coastal and brackish or alkaline inland waters of temperate Australia, Tasmania, and New Zealand.

The species are appended with common names that derive from their description as water-mats; for example, L. australis is referred to as Austral water-mat and L. marina as Sea water-mat.

Interpretation of molecular evidence for this poorly studied genus suggests a close affinity with Zannichellia, another genus of aquatic plants. Two species are noted for their occurrence in marine environs, L. cylindrocarpa and L. marina, in estuaries and tidal flats. L. cylindrocarpa is also found in a variety of brackish inland waters of mainland Australia. Other species may be found in habitats of fresh to brackish, still or slowly moving, coastal or inland waters.

Based on the molecular and morphological evidence, all the species have been transferred to the genus Althenia in 2016.
