= Althenia marina =

Conservation status
- Data Deficient (IUCN 3.1)

Scientific classification
- Kingdom: Plantae
- Clade: Tracheophytes
- Clade: Angiosperms
- Clade: Monocots
- Order: Alismatales
- Family: Potamogetonaceae
- Genus: Althenia
- Species: A. marina

Binomial name
- Althenia marina (E.L.Robertson) Yu Ito

Synonyms
- Lepilaena marina E.L.Robertson

Species of flowering plant

Althenia marina is a plant found in brackish to marine waters in Australia. The species has been transferred from the genus Lepilaena.
