= Althenia australis =

Conservation status
- Data Deficient (IUCN 3.1)

Scientific classification
- Kingdom: Plantae
- Clade: Embryophytes
- Clade: Tracheophytes
- Clade: Angiosperms
- Clade: Monocots
- Order: Alismatales
- Family: Potamogetonaceae
- Genus: Althenia
- Species: A. australis

Binomial name
- Althenia australis (J.Drumm. ex Harv.) Asch.

Synonyms
- Hexatheca australis Sond. ex Benth. Lepilaena australis J.Drumm. ex Harv.

Species of aquatic plant

Althenia australis is a species of aquatic plant in the family Potamogetonaceae. It is found in fresh to brackish waters in Australia. This species has been transferred from Lepilaena.
