= Broad-leaved pondweed =

Broad-leaved pondweed is a common name for several plants and may refer to:

- Potamogeton amplifolius, native to North America
- Potamogeton natans, native to the northern hemisphere, and known as broad-leaved pondweed in the British Isles

== See also ==
- Stuckenia striata, known as broadleaf pondweed
