= Zannichellia aschersoniana =

Conservation status
- Endangered (IUCN 3.1)

- Critically endangered (SANBI Red List)

Scientific classification
- Kingdom: Plantae
- Clade: Embryophytes
- Clade: Tracheophytes
- Clade: Angiosperms
- Clade: Monocots
- Order: Alismatales
- Family: Potamogetonaceae
- Genus: Zannichellia
- Species: Z. aschersoniana

Binomial name
- Zannichellia aschersoniana Graebn.
- IUCN range map from an assessment performed in 2007 Probably extant (resident)

Synonyms
- Pseudalthenia aschersoniana (Graebn.) Hartog; Vleisia aschersoniana (Graebn.) Toml.

Species of aquatic plant endemic to South Africa

Zannichellia aschersoniana is an endangered species of aquatic plant endemic to the West Coast of the Western Cape, South Africa.

== Habitat and range ==
Zannichellia aschersoniana is found between Lambert's Bay to Stilbaai in freshwater wetland systems.

== Conservation status ==
Zannichellia aschersoniana is assessed as critically endangered in the SANBI Red List of South African Plants, and endangered in the IUCN Red List due to its relatively small area of occupancy of less than 10 km^{2} (3.9 sq mi) in two locations around the Cape Peninsula. Its existence is threatened by the degradation of wetlands through urban expansion and the introduction of invasive alien plants. The species has not been recorded since the 1960s.
