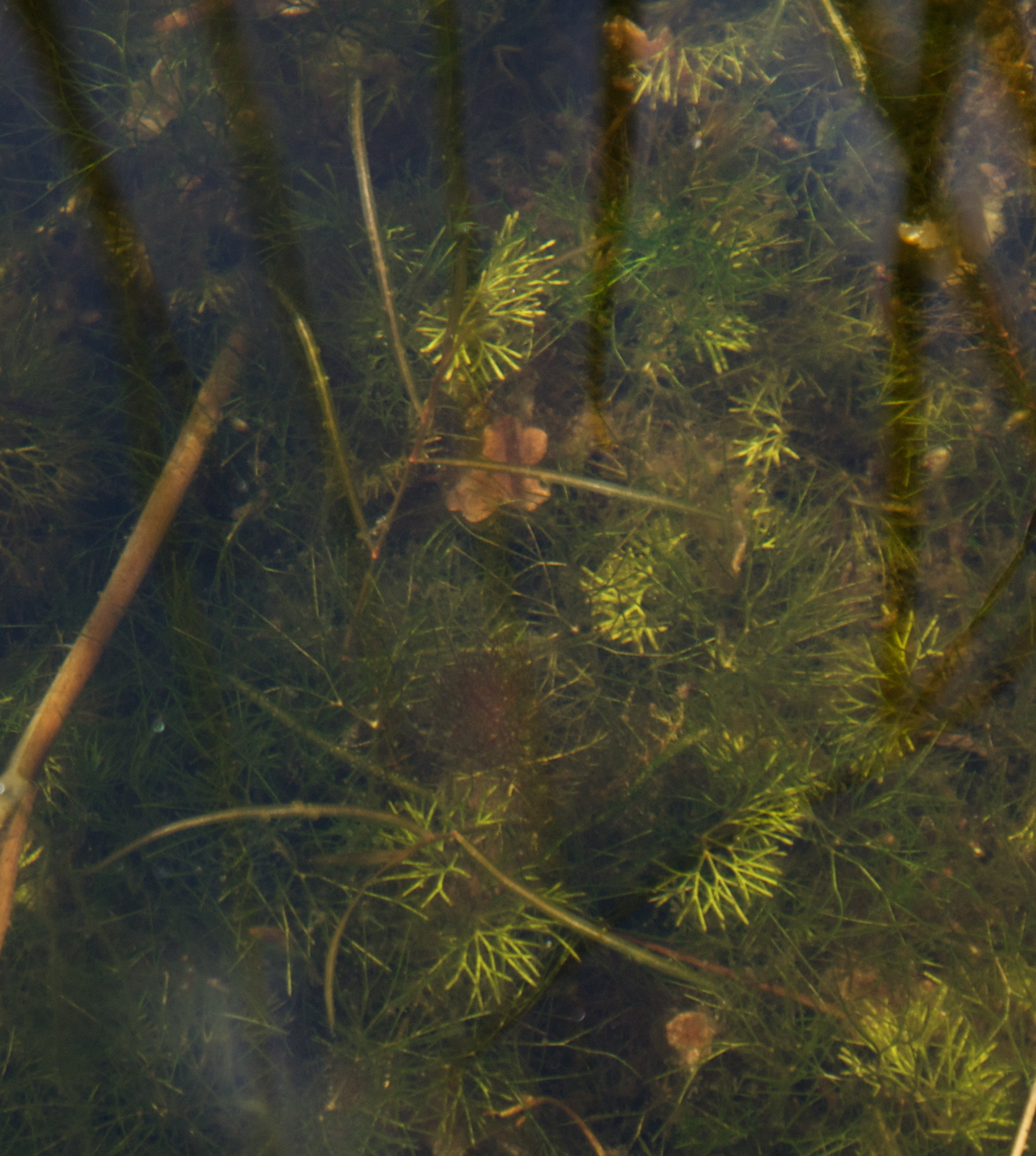
- Shoots of P. berchtoldii growing with milfoil and water crowfoot in a pond

Scientific classification
- Kingdom: Plantae
- Clade: Tracheophytes
- Clade: Angiosperms
- Clade: Monocots
- Order: Alismatales
- Family: Potamogetonaceae
- Genus: Potamogeton
- Species: P. berchtoldii

Binomial name
- Potamogeton berchtoldii Fieber

Synonyms
- Potamogeton fieberi Rouy Potamogeton groenlandicus Hagstr. Potamogeton lacunatus Hagstr.

= Potamogeton berchtoldii =

Species of plant

Potamogeton berchtoldii, common name small pondweed, is an aquatic plant.

== Description ==
Small pondweed is a fine-leaved pondweeds with a bushy habit. It lacks a perennial rhizome and the plants die back in winter into a large number of resting buds known as turions. The stems are very slender and do not usually exceed 60 cm. The leaves are flat, usually 25–50 mm long, and less than 2 mm wide, usually with a broad band of lacunae along each side of the midrib and coloured pale green, olive green or brownish green. The open stipules and shining nodal glands can be important characters in identification.

Small pondweed is similar to several other Potamogeton species, especially P. pusillus, and use of a good key such as Preston (1995) is strongly recommended. It could also be confused with P. trichoides and P. obtusifolius.

== Taxonomy ==
Small pondweed was first named by the German botanist Franz Xaver Fieber in 1838. It is named after the 19th century Czech botanist Friedrich von Berchtold.

This is one of a group of rather similar fine-leaved species that also includes P. pusillus, P. hillii and P. ochreatus. Some authors consider it a form of P. pusillus.

Subspecies include:

- Potamogeton berchtoldii subsp. berchtoldii
- Potamogeton berchtoldii subsp. clystocarpus (Fernald) Les & Tippery – treated by some as Potamogeton clystocarpus
- Potamogeton berchtoldii subsp. gemmiparus (J.W.Robbins) Les & Tippery

Hybrids have been described with P. trichoides (P. × franconicus G.Fisch.), P. pusillus (P. × mucronulatus (G.Fisch.) Papch.), P. natans, P. polygonifolius, P. coloratus (P. × lanceolatus Sm.), P. perfoliatus (P. × mysticus Morong), P. natans (P. × variifolius Thore), and P. acutifolius (P. × sudermanicus Hagstr.), but all are rare.

== Distribution ==
Potamogeton berchtoldii is native to Europe (including Britain, Ireland, continental Europe, Scandinavia), the Middle East, North America (Canada, US), Asia (Bhutan, China, Japan, Kazakhstan, Korea, Tajikistan, Turkmenistan, Russia, Uzbekistan), Asia Minor and the Middle East (Iraq, Iran, Turkey).

== Ecology and conservation ==
Potamogeton berchtoldii has a wide ecological tolerance, growing in lakes, ponds, ditches, slow-flowing streams and rivers, temporary pools and sometimes appearing in artificial environments such as cattle troughs. It is a good colonist and may quickly exploit new environments. The production of large numbers of both turions and seed likely allows it to quickly exploit new or disturbed environments, but in stable environments it is likely to be outcompeted by more robust plants.

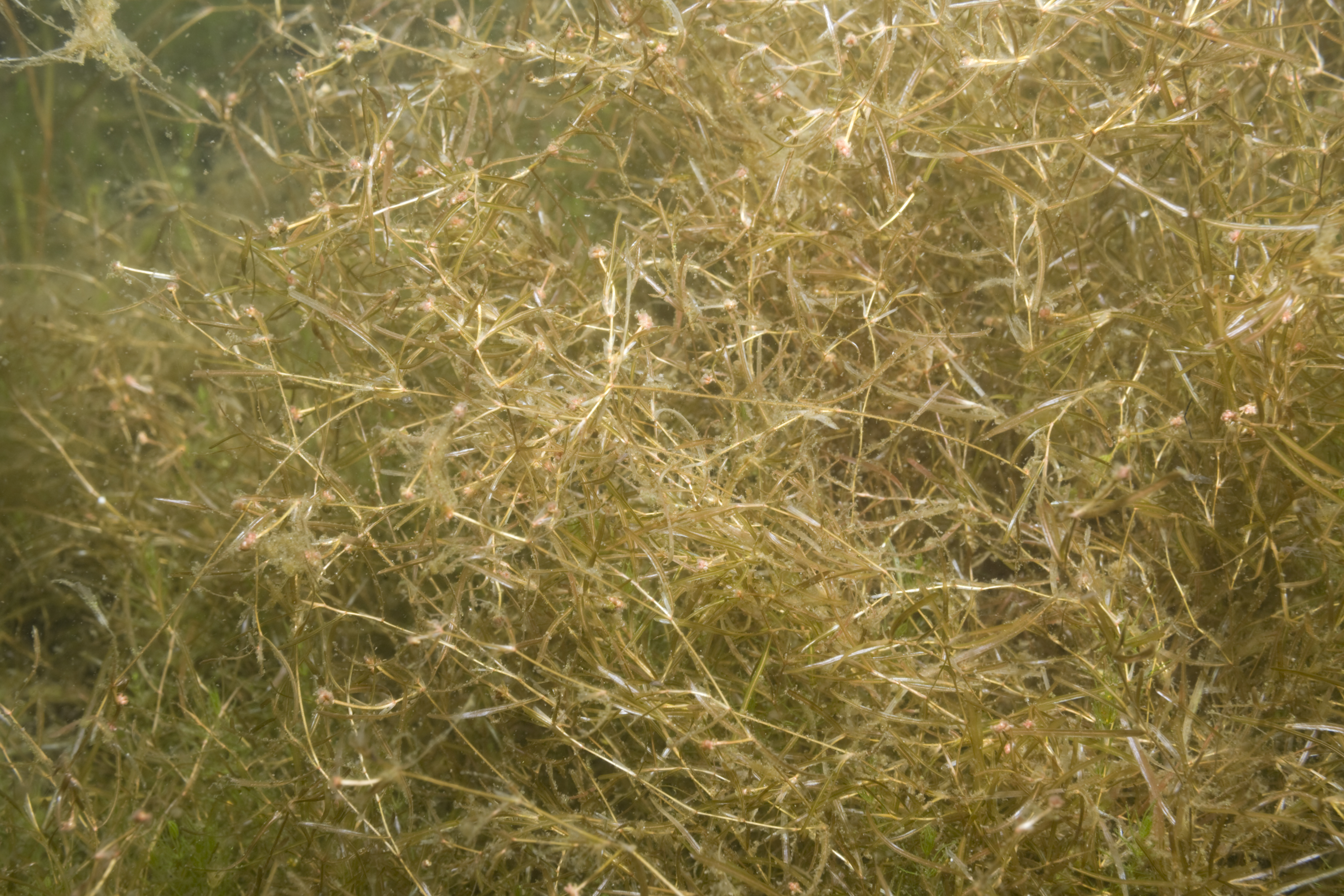
Small pondweed Potamogeton berchtoldii growing in Llyn Cregennen Isaf, Wales

In Britain, small pondweed is common and widespread. It is probably under-recorded due to its relatively small size and confusion with P. pusillus.

Although it does not occur in very acid environments, small pondweed is otherwise tolerant of a wide range of water chemistry and seems able to survive in eutrophic conditions. However, it is less tolerant of high nutrient levels than the related and very similar P. pusillus. It is the only British fine-leaved pondweed likely to be encountered in oligotrophic lakes, where it generally grows in deeper water with Isoetes and Nitella spp.

== Cultivation ==
Small pondweed is not in cultivation, though it is likely to spontaneously colonise new ponds, probably via waterfowl. It is unlikely to persist for long in this environment, however, unless competing plants are regularly cleared. Its small stature and noninvasive habit make it suitable for growing in a pond or aquarium.
