= Potamogeton clystocarpus =

Conservation status
- Critically Imperiled (NatureServe)

Scientific classification
- Kingdom: Plantae
- Clade: Tracheophytes
- Clade: Angiosperms
- Clade: Monocots
- Order: Alismatales
- Family: Potamogetonaceae
- Genus: Potamogeton
- Species: P. clystocarpus

Binomial name
- Potamogeton clystocarpus Fernald
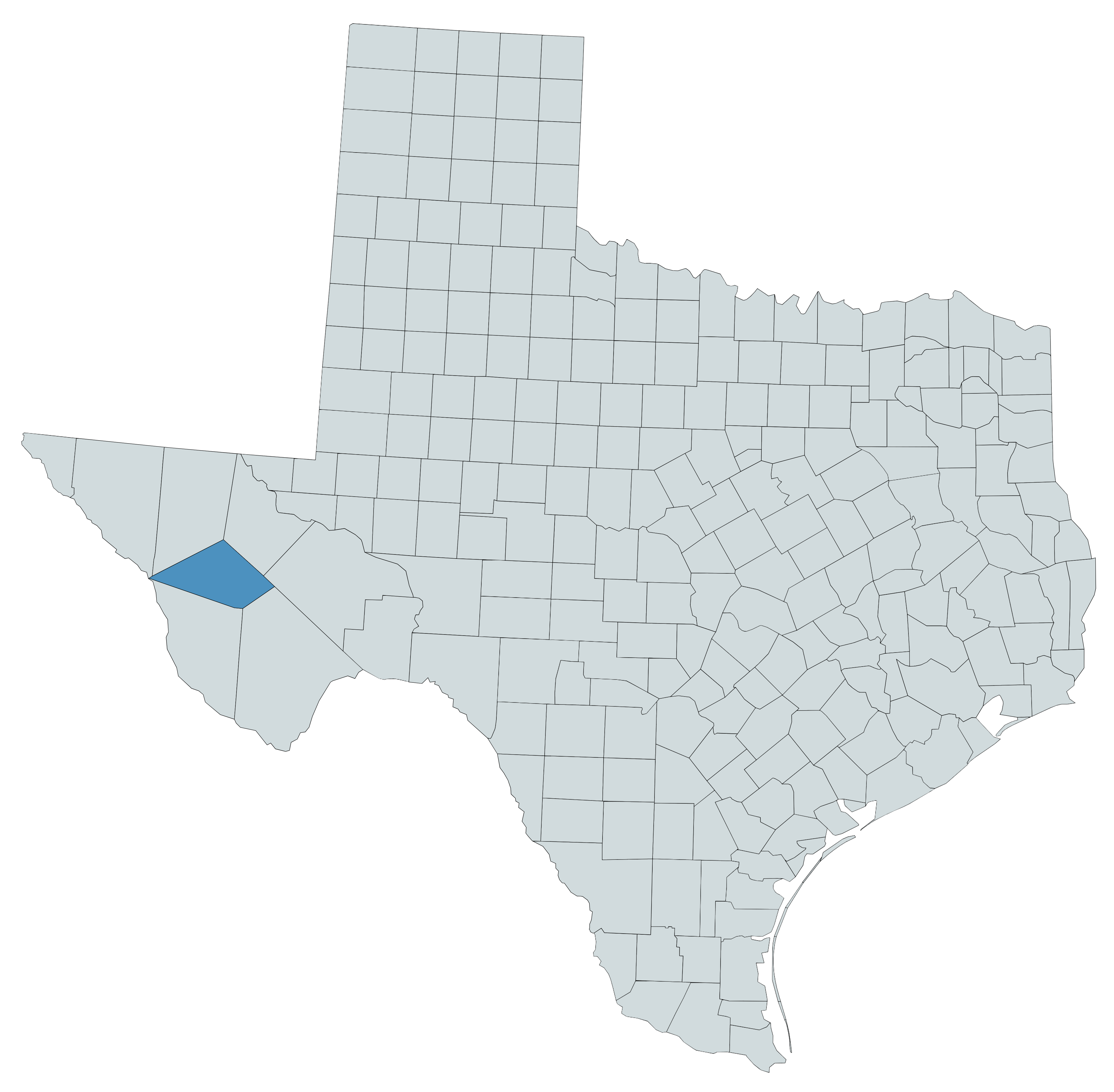
- Range of Potamogeton clystocarpus in Texas

Species of flowering plant

Potamogeton clystocarpus is a rare species of flowering plant in the pondweed family known by the common name Little Aguja pondweed. It is endemic to Texas in the United States, where it is known only from Little Aguja Creek in Jeff Davis County. This single population represents the only known occurrence of this aquatic plant. It is a federally listed endangered species of the United States.

== Description ==
This aquatic plant has slender stems growing up to 57 centimeters long, with length varying depending on water depth. The delicate, spirally arranged leaves are linear in shape and measure up to 7.8 centimeters long by 1–2 millimeters wide. The inflorescence is the only part of the plant that emerges above the water's surface.

== Reproduction ==
The plant reproduces both sexually via seed and vegetatively through stem fragments that can root and establish new plants. Little else is known about the plant's life history.

== Habitat and distribution ==
The species is restricted to Little Aguja Creek, which drains the Davis Mountains of West Texas. This dynamic stream experiences seasonal fluctuations including drought conditions with low water levels and scouring floods during high drainage periods. Water quality is affected by upstream chemical contamination and livestock activity.

== Conservation status ==
First collected in 1931, the plant was typically abundant in its limited habitat when observed. However, following severe flooding in 1991–1992 that scoured the canyon, the species has not been observed despite subsequent surveys.
