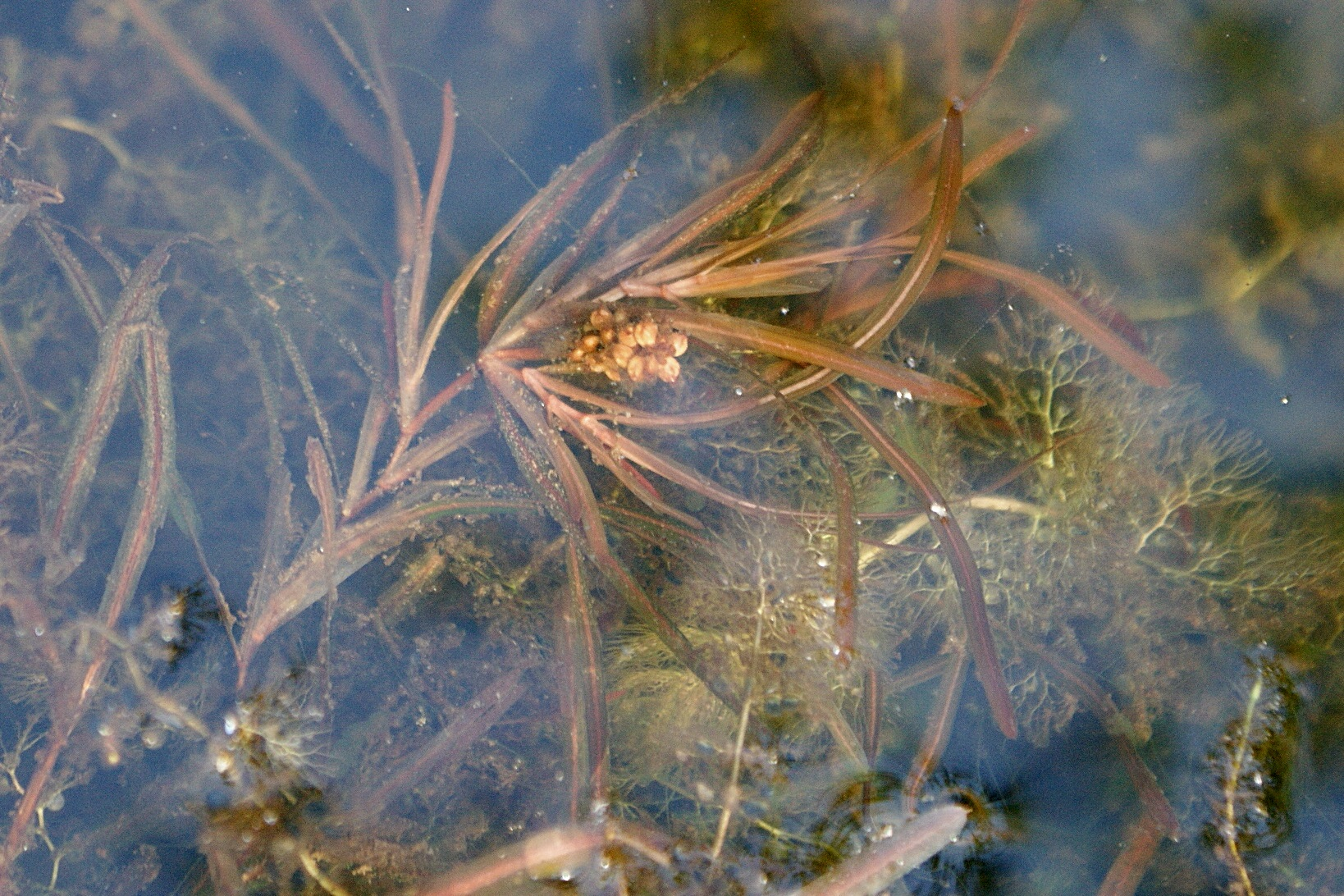

Conservation status
- Least Concern (IUCN 3.1)

Scientific classification
- Kingdom: Plantae
- Clade: Tracheophytes
- Clade: Angiosperms
- Clade: Monocots
- Order: Alismatales
- Family: Potamogetonaceae
- Genus: Potamogeton
- Species: P. obtusifolius

Binomial name
- Potamogeton obtusifolius Mert. & W.D.J.Koch

Synonyms
- Buccaferrea obtusifolia (Mert. & W.D.J.Koch) Bubani; Potamogeton divaricatus Wolfg.; Potamogeton liljebladii Wallman ex Rchb.; Potamogeton tataricus Less.; Potamogeton reflexus A.Benn.; Spirillus obtusifolius (Mert. & W.D.J.Koch) Nieuwl.

= Potamogeton obtusifolius =

Species of aquatic plant

Potamogeton obtusifolius, known as blunt-leaved pondweed, is an aquatic plant in the genus Potamogeton. It grows mainly in mesotrophic to eutrophic lakes, ponds and ditches, rarely in brackish water. It occurs primarily in Central Europe, the British Isles, Fennoscandia and eastern North America.

== Description ==
Blunt-leaved pondweed grows annually from turions and seed, producing branching plants with slender, flattened stems that have well-developed nodal glands (these appear as two raised bumps on the stem where the leaf attaches). The submerged leaves are long, rather grass-like, sessile, translucent leaves that are 48–85 (rarely up to 100) mm long and 1.5–3.55 mm wide and pale green, often with a very marked reddish or brownish tinge and a pink tinge along the midrib. There are 1–2 lateral veins either side of the midrib. As the name suggests, the leaf tips are rather blunt, though close inspection usually reveals a narrow point at the tip. The stipules are open. There are no rhizomes or floating leaves. Abundant turions are produced along the stem, especially in autumn as the plant disintegrates.

The flower spikes of blunt-leaved pondweed are rather short and dense, 4–9 mm long with 6–8 flowers in each. Fruits, which are approximately 3 × 2 mm, are freely produced.

Blunt-leaved pondweed could be confused with other fine-leaved pondweeds within its range, especially Potamogeton berchtoldii and P. friesii, but potentially also P. pusillus. The combination of open stipules, rounded tips to the leaves, dense flower spikes and a tendency to produce a mass of bushy growth at the surface all help to distinguish this plant, but use of a botanical key or flora is recommended.

Potamogeton obtusifolius is diploid, with 2n=26.

According to a key monograph on the genus, no hybrids of Potamogeton obtusifolius have been confirmed. However, P. × saxonicus Hagstr. has been suggested to be the hybrid with P. pusillus.

== Taxonomy ==
Blunt-leaved pondweed was first described in 1823 by Franz Carl Mertens and Wilhelm Daniel Joseph Koch. The specific name obtusifolius means 'blunt-leaved'. It is related to other fine-leaved pondweeds, such as P. friesii and P. pusillus.

Wang et al. have suggested based on DNA analysis that P. obtusifolius may have arisen through hybridisation between P. compressus and P. pusillus.

== Distribution ==
Potamogeton obtusifolius has a wide global distribution, occurring in North America (Canada, northern US), Europe (Scandinavia, Central Europe, N Balkans, Great Britain, Ireland, France, N Spain), Asia (NE China (Heilongjiang Province), Russia, Japan, Kazakhstan, Kyrgyzstan, Mongolia, Myanmar, Caucasus, Iran).

== Ecology and conservation ==
In Britain, P. obtusifolius occurs in a range of standing water habitats including ponds, ditches, canals and shallow lakes, favouring circumneutral or slightly acidic waters. It is strictly a lowland plant and rarely observed in running water, except where current speeds are very slow. Although widely distributed it has a patchy distribution and is not usually abundant at any individual site. Like other fine-leaved pondweeds, P. obtusifolius probably benefits from a certain amount of disturbance to suppress competing vegetation. It seems to favour smaller water bodies and apparently tolerates poor water quality, including turbid water, reasonably well. In spite of this, blunt-leaved pondweed does not usually proliferate in eutrophic lakes. It is possible that this species is rather sensitive to wind action.

In cultivation, P. obtusifolius leaves were eaten by three different species of chironomid (non-biting midge) larvae.

Globally and in various national Red Lists, blunt-leaved pondweed is considered Least Concern. However, blunt-leaved pondweed has suffered local declines and is Critically Endangered in Switzerland, Vulnerable in Germany, Very Rare in Luxemburg, listed as Endangered in New Jersey and Pennsylvania, and Sensitive in Washington.

It is considered to have declined in Britain, but is still widespread, and listed as Least Concern.

== Cultivation ==
Blunt-leaved pondweed is not presently in cultivation. Although its wide ecological tolerance suggests it may not be difficult to grow, it would probably require a deeper substrate than is usual in most ponds. It can also be grown in aquaria by anchoring the turions in sand or mud. It is also likely to compete poorly with other pond plants.
