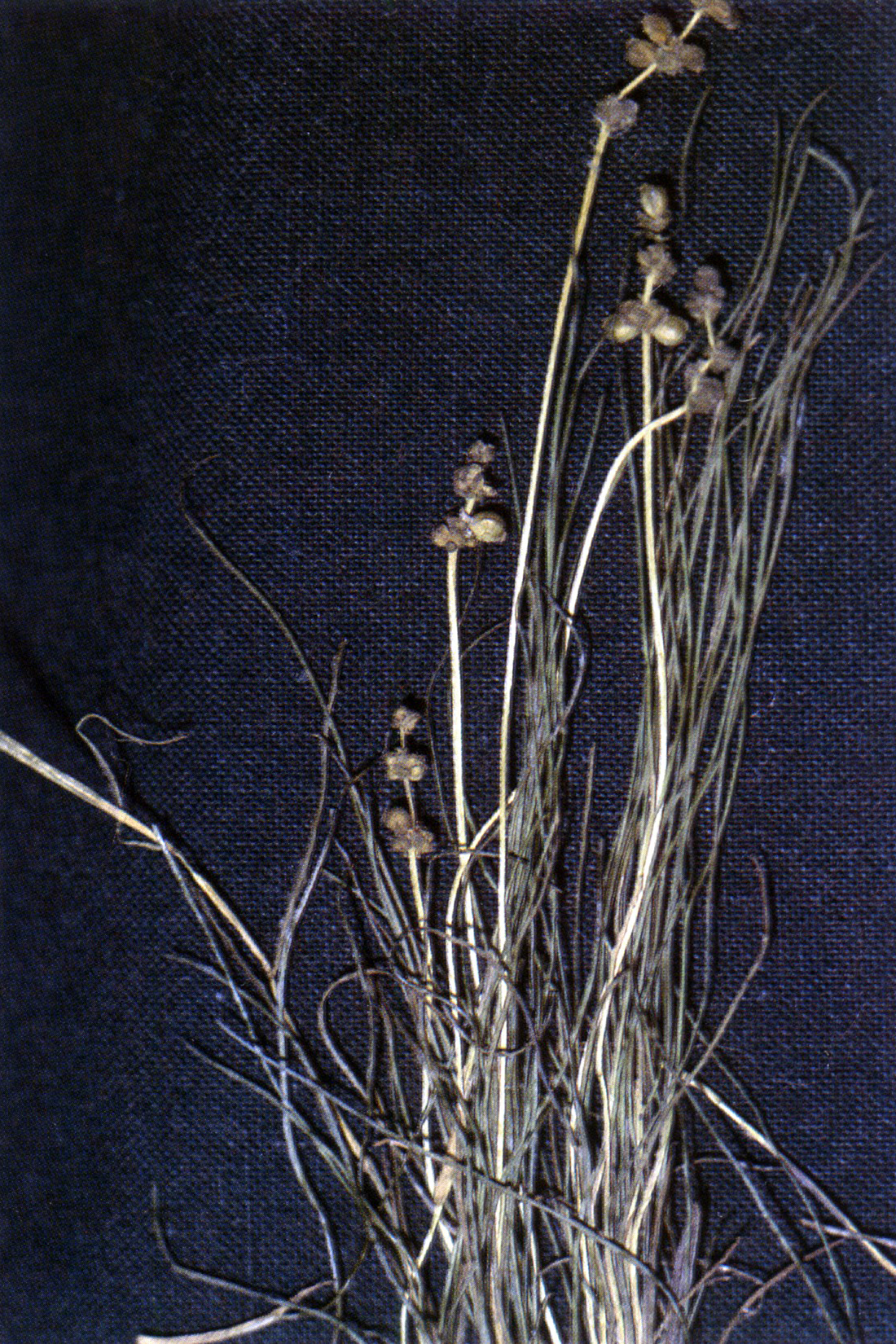
- Stuckenia filiformis

Scientific classification
- Kingdom: Plantae
- Clade: Tracheophytes
- Clade: Angiosperms
- Clade: Monocots
- Order: Alismatales
- Family: Potamogetonaceae
- Genus: Stuckenia
- Species: S. filiformis

Binomial name
- Stuckenia filiformis (Pers.) Börner

= Stuckenia filiformis =

Species of flowering plant

Stuckenia filiformis is a species of flowering plant belonging to the family Potamogetonaceae.

Its native range is Temperate Northern Hemisphere, Hispaniola, Ecuador to South America.

Synonym:

- Potamogeton filiformis Pers.
