= Stuckenia striata =

Scientific classification
- Kingdom: Plantae
- Clade: Tracheophytes
- Clade: Angiosperms
- Clade: Monocots
- Order: Alismatales
- Family: Potamogetonaceae
- Genus: Stuckenia
- Species: S. striata

Binomial name
- Stuckenia striata (Ruiz & Pav.) Holub

Synonyms
- Coleogeton striatus (Ruiz & Pav.) Les & R.R.Haynes; Potamogeton pectinatus var. striatus (Ruiz & Pav.) Hagstr.; Potamogeton striatus Ruiz & Pav.; Potamogeton australis F.Phil. ex Phil.; Potamogeton dissimilis A.Benn.; Potamogeton filiformis var. latifolius (J.W.Robbins) Reveal; Potamogeton latifolius (J.W.Robbins) Morong; Potamogeton latior Holub; Potamogeton pectinatus var. latifolius J.W.Robbins

Species of aquatic plant

Stuckenia striata is a species of aquatic plant in the family Potamogetonaceae. It is known by the common names broadleaf pondweed Nevada pondweed and striped pondweed. It is native to the Americas, including the southwestern United States, northern Mexico, and parts of Central and South America. It grows in waterways such as rivers, canals, and shallow ponds, often in alkaline water. This is a perennial herb producing a long, thin, branching stem approaching 2 m (6 ft 7 in) in maximum length. The narrow, hairlike leaves are up to 10 cm (3.9 in) long and only a few millimeters wide. The inflorescence is a spike of flowers arranged in whorls and borne on a short peduncle.
