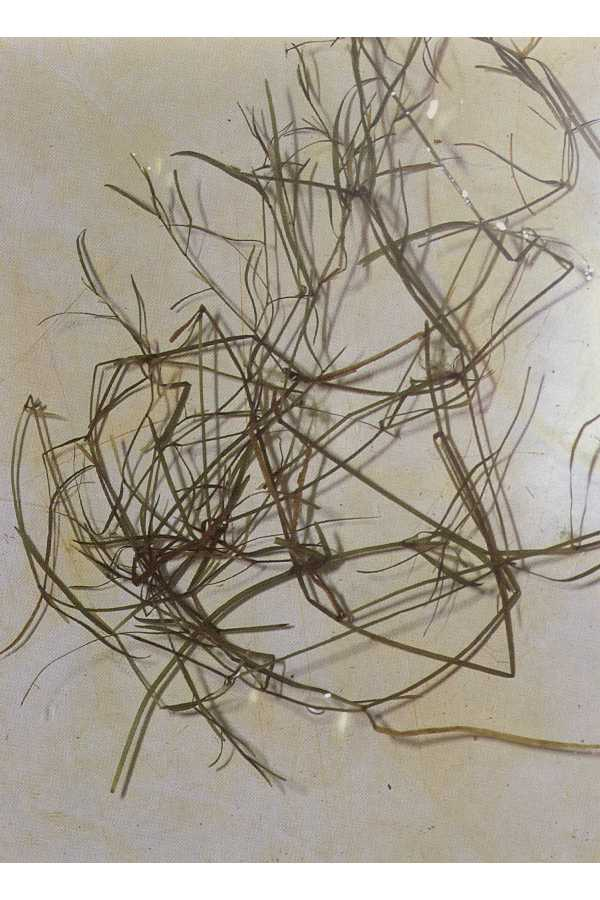
- Stuckenia pectinata

Scientific classification
- Kingdom: Plantae
- Clade: Tracheophytes
- Clade: Angiosperms
- Clade: Monocots
- Order: Alismatales
- Family: Potamogetonaceae
- Genus: Stuckenia; Börner, 1912

Species
- See text.

= Stuckenia =

Genus of flowering plants

Stuckenia is a genus of flowering aquatic plants. It contains approximately 30 species that grow in shallow water. Pondweed is a common name for plants in this genus.

== Description ==
These herbs have rhizomes but not turions. Tubers can be absent or present. The main difference between Stuckenia and Potamogeton is that the stipule joins the leaf base. When it is pulled the sheath and stipule comes away, similar to a grass sheath and ligule.

== Species ==
- Stuckenia aldanensis
- Stuckenia amblyophylla
- Stuckenia arctovaginata
- Stuckenia austrosibirica
- Stuckenia borealis
- Stuckenia bottnica
- Stuckenia carbonata
- Stuckenia chakassiensis
- Stuckenia clavata
- Stuckenia fennica
- Stuckenia filiformis (slenderleaf-pondweed)
- Stuckenia gibbosa
- Stuckenia helvetica
- Stuckenia interior
- Stuckenia macrocarpa
- Stuckenia marina
- Stuckenia matyrensis
- Stuckenia meinshausenii
- Stuckenia mirabilis
- Stuckenia mongolica
- Stuckenia omoloica
- Stuckenia palaeofiliformis
- Stuckenia pamirica
- Stuckenia pectinata (fennel pondweed, sago pondweed)
- Stuckenia praepectinata
- Stuckenia praevaginata
- Stuckenia pseudorostrata
- Stuckenia punensis
- Stuckenia sakmarensis
- Stuckenia striata (broadleaf pondweed)
- Stuckenia subretusa
- Stuckenia suecica
- Stuckenia tenuicarpa
- Stuckenia vaginata (sheathed pondweed)
- Stuckenia vaginatoides
- Stuckenia zosteracea
