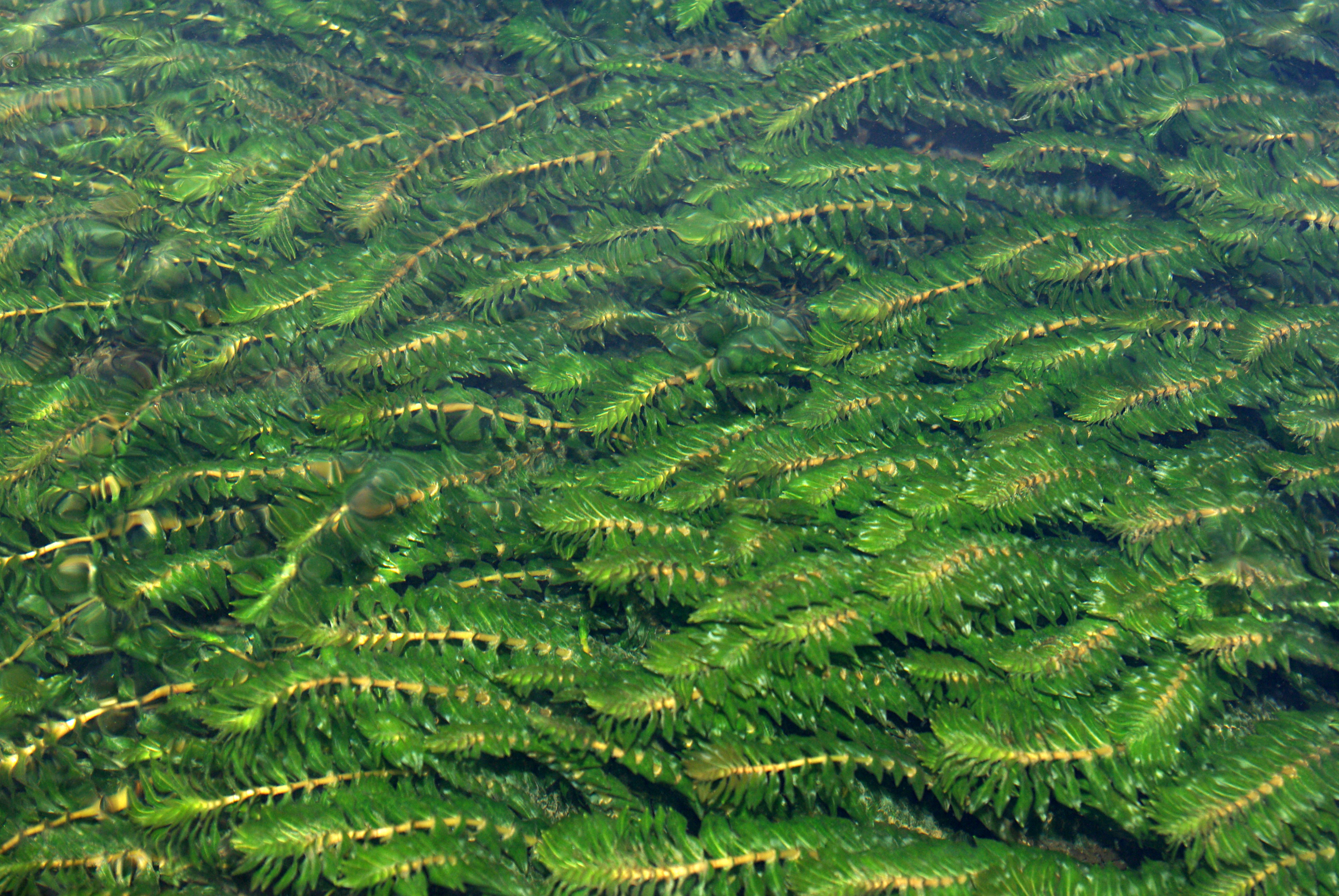
- Groenlandia densa

Conservation status
- Least Concern (IUCN 3.1)

Scientific classification
- Kingdom: Plantae
- Clade: Tracheophytes
- Clade: Angiosperms
- Clade: Monocots
- Order: Alismatales
- Family: Potamogetonaceae
- Genus: Groenlandia; J.Gay
- Species: G. densa

Binomial name
- Groenlandia densa (L.) Fourr.

= Groenlandia =

Genus of aquatic plants

Groenlandia is a monotypic genus of aquatic plants (pondweed) of the family Potamogetonaceae. The only species in the genus is Groenlandia densa. Opposite-leaved pondweed is a common name for this plant. It is native to much of Europe, western Asia and Maghreb in Africa; despite its name it is not found in Greenland.
