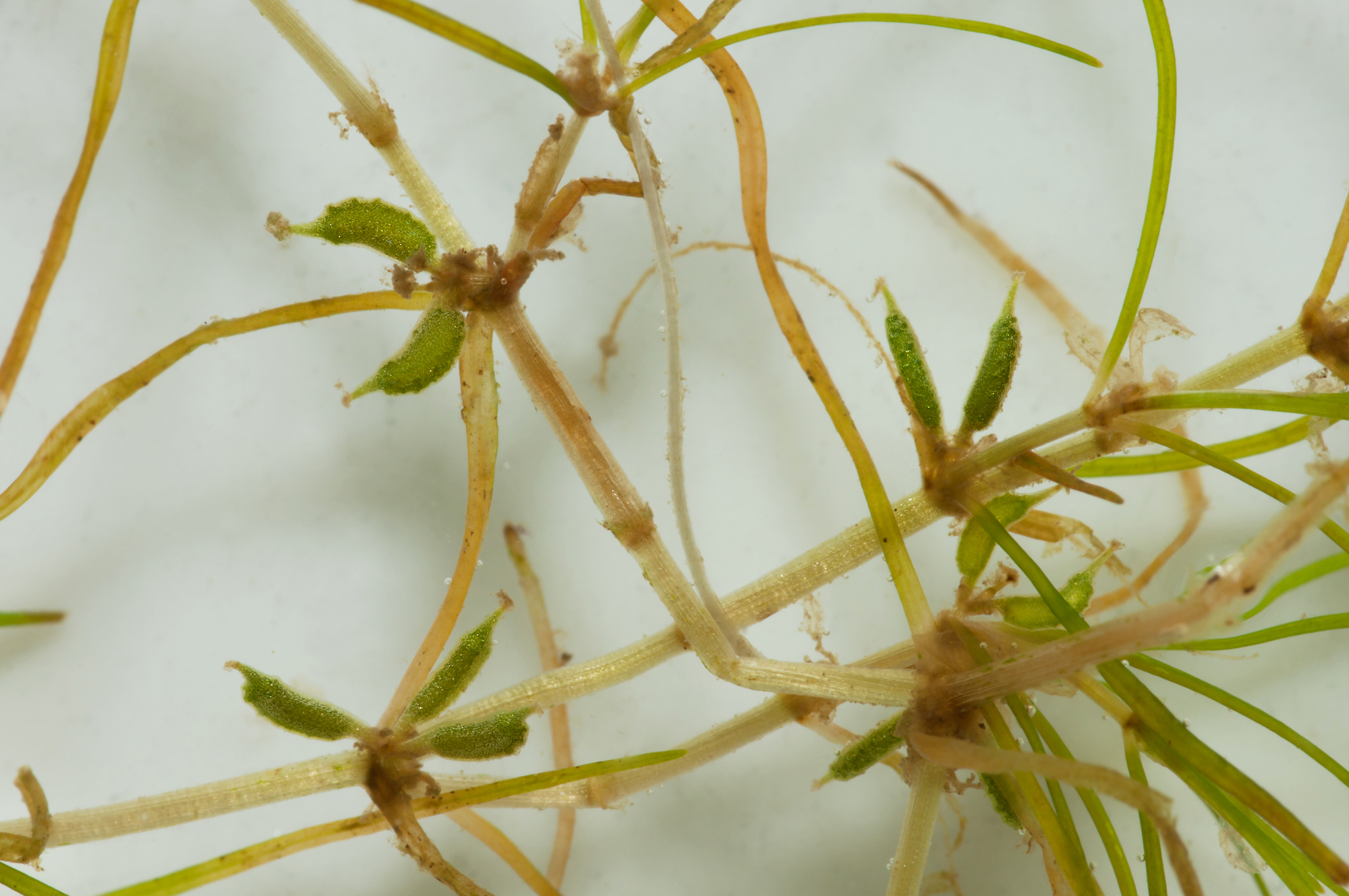

Scientific classification
- Kingdom: Plantae
- Clade: Tracheophytes
- Clade: Angiosperms
- Clade: Monocots
- Order: Alismatales
- Family: Potamogetonaceae
- Genus: Zannichellia
- Species: Z. palustris

Binomial name
- Zannichellia palustris L.

= Zannichellia palustris =

Species of aquatic plant

Zannichellia palustris, the horned pondweed, is a plant found in fresh to brackish waters in the United States (especially in the Chesapeake Bay), Europe, Asia, Australasia, and South America. It is recognizable by its long, thread-like leaves and "stringy" appearance. Its roots are long and tendril-like, and its seeds bear a distinctive horned shape, hence the common name. The species epithet palustris is Latin for "of the marsh" and indicates its common habitat. A diploid, its chromosome number was confirmed as 2n = 24.
