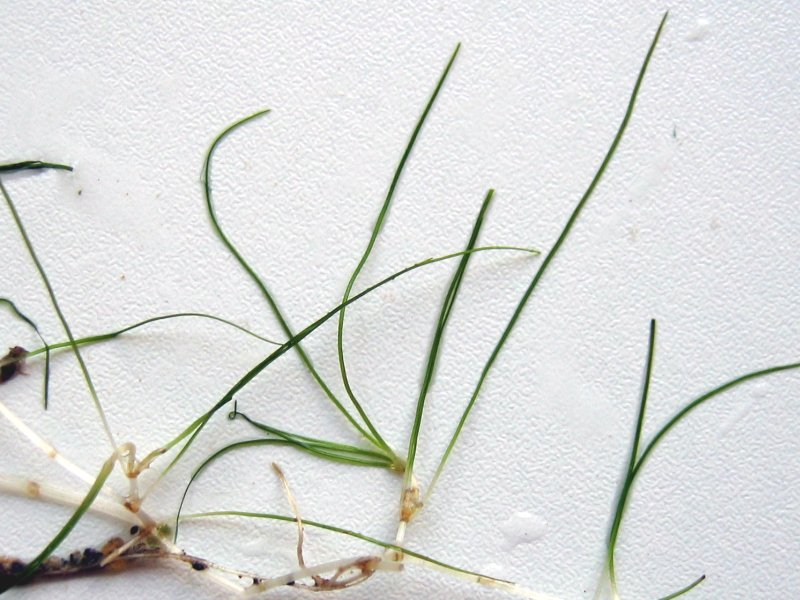
- Zannichellia palustris

Scientific classification
- Kingdom: Plantae
- Clade: Embryophytes
- Clade: Tracheophytes
- Clade: Spermatophytes
- Clade: Angiosperms
- Clade: Monocots
- Order: Alismatales
- Family: Potamogetonaceae
- Genus: Zannichellia; P.Micheli ex L.

Synonyms
- Pelta Dulac; Pseudalthenia (Graebn.) Nakai; Vleisia Toml. & Posl.

= Zannichellia =

Genus of flowering plants

Zannichellia (common name horned pondweed) is a genus of submerged aquatic flowering plant, with threadlike leaves and tiny flowers. It is fully adapted to an aquatic life cycle, including underwater pollination.

There are perhaps five species, including Zannichellia palustris.

The genus is named after Gian Girolamo Zannichelli (1662–1729), Italian botanist.

== Description ==
These slender plants grow submerged in water. The leaves are usually oppositely arranged and long and narrow. They have stipular sheaths.

The flowers are unisexual. The male flowers have a single stamen with a slender filament and anthers that are 2-4-thecous.

The female flowers have a cup-shaped membranous perianth. There are usually four carpels with a single pendulous ovule in each ovary. The stigma is shield shaped with toothed margins.

The fruit is usually made of four long, dry achenes. The seeds are pendulous with a sub-cylindric embryo. The cotyledonous end is folded on itself twice.

== Distribution ==
The species of this genus are widely distributed and are found growing in temperate and tropical regions around the world. They grow in brackish and salt water.

== Species ==
Six species are accepted.

- Zannichellia andina Holm-Niels. & R.R.Haynes
- Zannichellia aschersoniana Graebn.
- Zannichellia contorta (Desf.) Cham.
- Zannichellia obtusifolia Talavera, García-Mur. & H.Smit
- Zannichellia palustris L.
- Zannichellia peltata Bertol.
