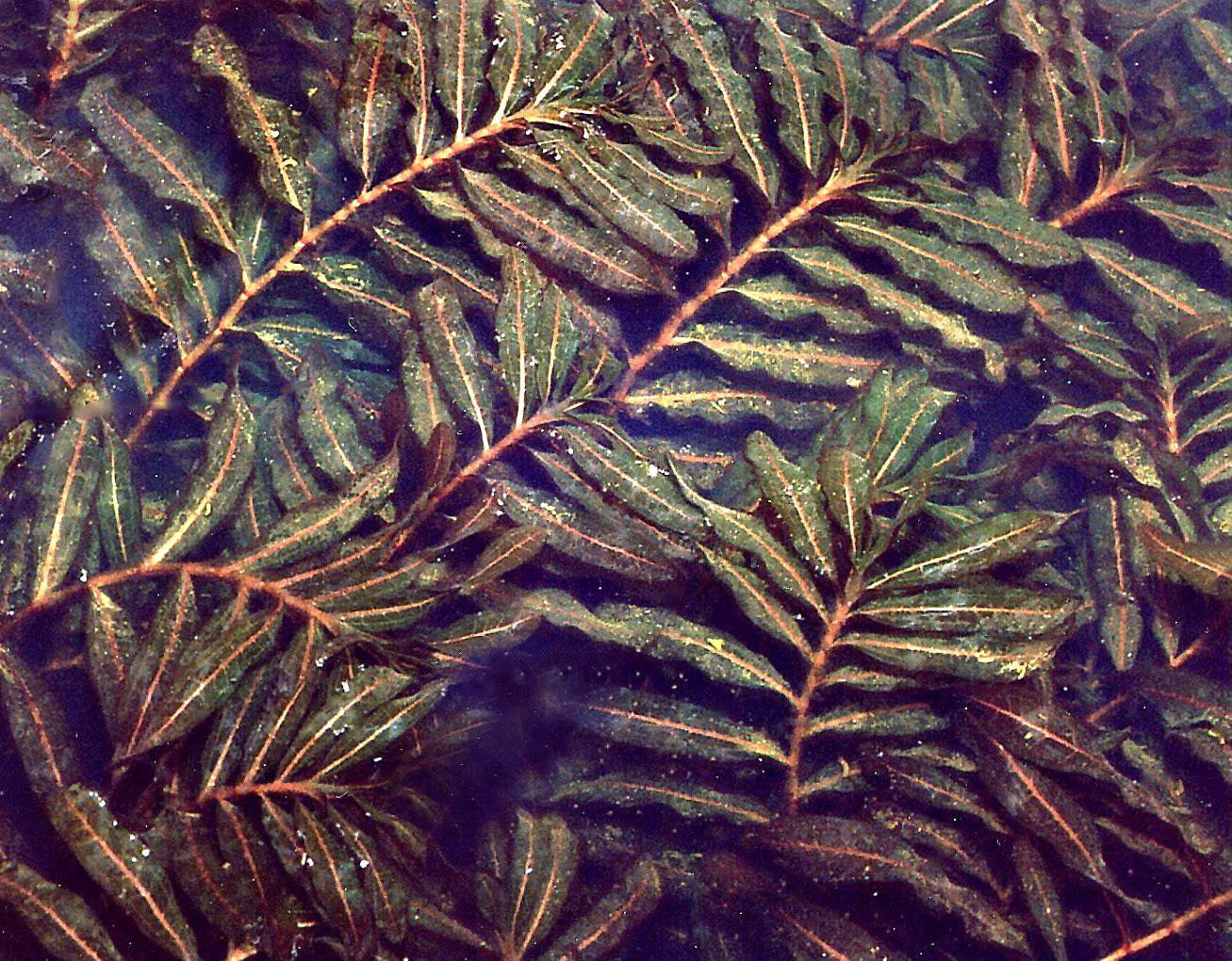
- Potamogeton crispus

Scientific classification
- Kingdom: Plantae
- Clade: Tracheophytes
- Clade: Angiosperms
- Clade: Monocots
- Order: Alismatales
- Family: Potamogetonaceae; Rchb.

Genera
- See text

Synonyms
- Zannichelliaceae Chevall.

= Potamogetonaceae =

Family of aquatic plants

The Potamogetonaceae, commonly referred to as the pondweed family, is an aquatic family of monocotyledonous flowering plants. The roughly 110 known species are divided over five genera. The largest genus in the family by far is Potamogeton, which contains about 100 species.

The family has a subcosmopolitan distribution, and is considered to be one of the most important angiosperm groups in the aquatic environment because of its use as food and habitat for aquatic animals.

== Taxonomy ==
The Potamogetonaceae are currently placed in the early diverging monocot order Alismatales by the Angiosperm Phylogeny Group. Their concept of the family includes the plants sometimes treated in the separate family Zannichelliaceae, but excludes the genus Ruppia. So circumscribed, the family currently consists of five genera totalling about 120 species of perennial aquatic plants.

- Althenia F.Petit
- Groenlandia J.Gay
- Potamogeton L.
- Stuckenia Börner
- Zannichellia P.Micheli ex L.

- Potamogetonaceae
  - Groenlandia
  - - - Pseudalthenia
      - Zannichellia
    - - Althenia
  - - Stuckenia
    - Potamogeton

Marine grasses families: Zosteraceae, Cymodoceaceae, Ruppiaceae and Posidoniaceae. Related families: Potamogetonaceae, Zannichelliaceae (not consistently).

Families and Genera crosses (Sea grasses)
Kubitzki (ed. 1998)	Watson & Dallwitz (delta-intkey)	data.kew	APWeb (mobot.org)
Zosteraceae
1. Zostera L.	Zostera	Zostera L.	Zostera L. (including Heterozostera den Hartog, Macrozostera Tomlinson & Posluzny, Nanozostera Tomlinson & Posluzny, Zosterella J. K. Small)
2. Heterozostera den Hartog	Heterozostera	Heterozostera (Setch.) Hartog	(in Zostera)
3. Phyllospadix Hook.	Phyllospadix	Phyllospadix Hook.	Phyllospadix J. D. Hooker
Cymodoceaceae
1. Syringodium Kütz	Syringodium	Syringodium Kutz.	(in Cymodocea)
2. Halodule Endl.	Halodule	Halodule Endl.	Halodule Endlicher
3. Cymodocea König	Cymodocea	Cymodocea K.Koenig (including Phycoschoenus (Asch.) Nakai )	Cymodocea König (including Amphibolis Agardh ?, Syringodium Kütz. ?, Thalassodendron den Hartog ?)
4. Amphibolis Agardh	Amphibolis	Amphibolis C.Agardh (including Pectinella J.M.Black)	(in Cymodocea)
5. Thalassodendron de Hartog	(name not found)	Thalassodendron Hartog	(in Cymodocea)
Ruppiaceae
Ruppia L.	Ruppia	(in Ruppia L. in Potamogetonaceae)	Ruppia L.
Posidoniaceae
Posidonia König	Posidonia	Posidonia K.Koenig	Posidonia König

Families and Genera crosses (Potamogetonaceae)
Kubitzki (ed. 1998)	Watson & Dallwitz (delta-intkey)	data.kew	APWeb (mobot.org)
Potamogetonaceae
1. Potamogeton L.	Potamogeton	Potamogeton L.	Potamogeton L. (including Coleogeton Les & Haynes, Stuckenia Börner)
2. Groenlandia J. Gray	Groenlandia	Groenlandia J.Gay	Groenlandia J. Gay
(in Ruppia in Ruppiaceae)	(in Ruppia in Ruppiaceae)	Ruppia L.	(in Ruppia in Ruppiaceae)
(in Althenia: Zannichelliaceae and Lepilaena: Zannichelliaceae)	(in Althenia: Zannichelliaceae and Lepilaena: Zannichelliaceae)	(in Althenia F.Petit: Zannichelliaceae and Lepilaena J.L.Drumm. ex Harv.:Zannichelliaceae)	Althenia Petit (including Lepilaena Harvey)
(in Pseudalthenia including Vleisia: Zannichelliaceae)	(in Pseudalthenia: Zannichelliaceae and Vleisia: Zannichelliaceae)	(Pseudalthenia not found, Vleisia Toml. & Posl.: Zannichelliaceae)	Pseudalthenia Nakai (including Vleisia Tomlinson & Posluszny)
(in Zannichellia L.: Zannichelliaceae)	(in Zannichellia: Zannichelliaceae)	(in Zannichellia L.: Zannichelliaceae)	Zannichellia L.
Zannichelliaceae
1. Zannichellia L.	Zannichellia	Zannichellia L.	(in Zannichellia L.: Potamogetonaceae)
2. Pseudalthenia Nakai (including Vleisia)	Pseudalthenia (excluding Vleisia)	(name not found)	(in Pseudalthenia: Potamogetonaceae)
3. Althenia Petit (excluding Lepilaena Drumm. ex. Harv.)	Althenia (excluding Lepilaena)	Althenia F.Petit (excluding Lepilaena J.L.Drumm. ex Harv.)	Althenia Petit (including Lepilaena Harvey)
4. Lepilaena Drumm. ex. Harv.	Lepilaena	Lepilaena J.L.Drumm. ex Harv.	(in Althenia Petit)
(in Pseudalthenia)	Vleisia	Vleisia Toml. & Posl.	(in Pseudalthenia: Potamogetonaceae)

== Characteristics ==
The plants are all aquatic perennial herbs, often with creeping rhizomes and leafy branches. Their leaf blades can be either floating or submerged, and their stems are often joined. No stomata are present on the leaves. The flowers are tetramerous: the floral formula (sepals; petals; stamens; carpels) is [4;0;4;4]. The flowers have no petals. The fruit consists of one to four drupelets or achenes.
