= Navua Valles =

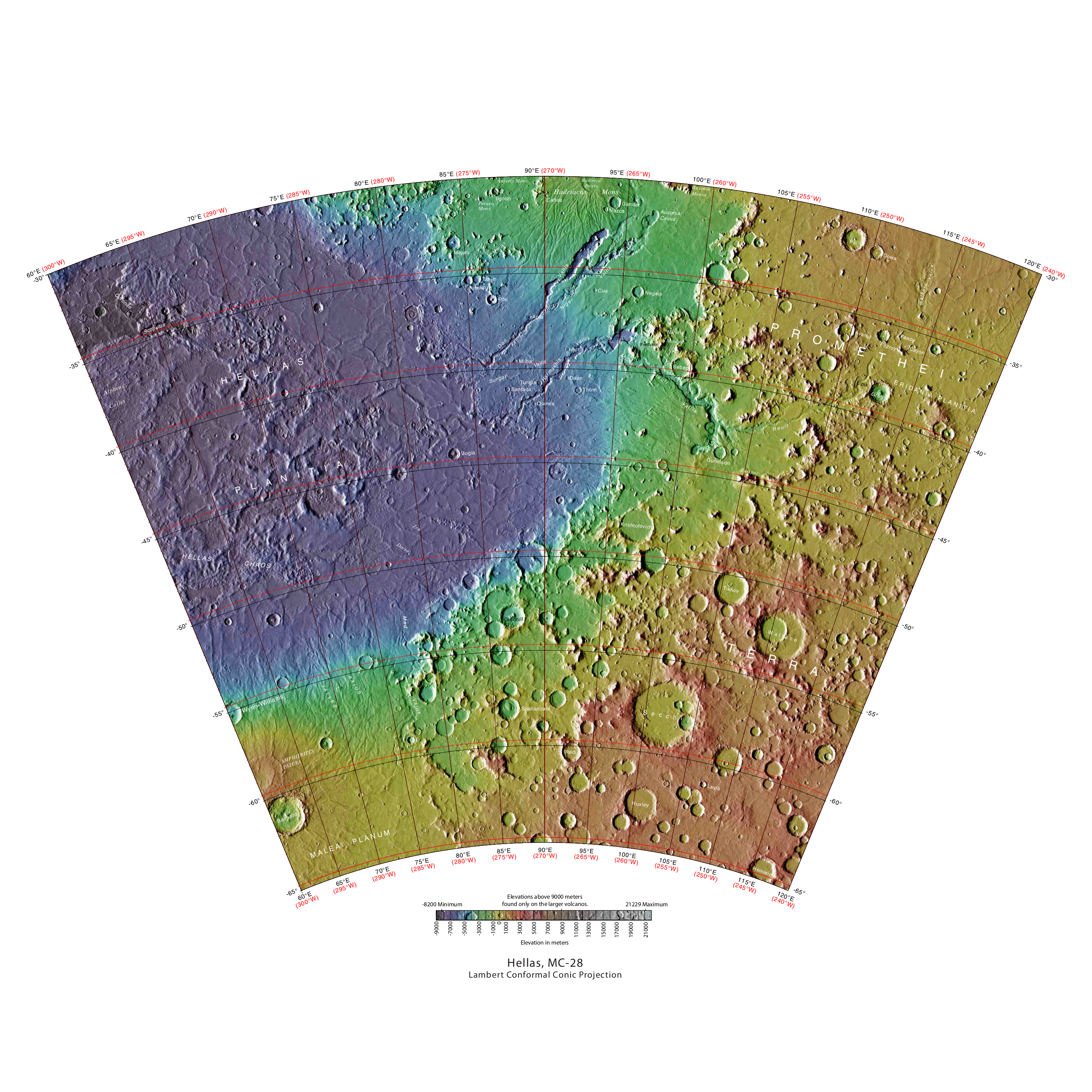
Hellas Basin with Navua Valles region.

Navua Valles is a region on the planet Mars, northeast of Hellas Basin, containing several valleys and channels. Navua Valles plains and channels formed in the Hesperian and Amazonian epochs by episodic volcanic and fluvial activity. Navua Valles is named by IAU after Navua River in Fiji, Earth. Some drainage networks in Navua Valles are discontinuous, and laid down deposits at the termini of each segment. The main discontinuous drainage probably originated from localized precipitation at its source region, near a large crater, and transported water into Hellas Basin.
