= Wetlands of Canada =

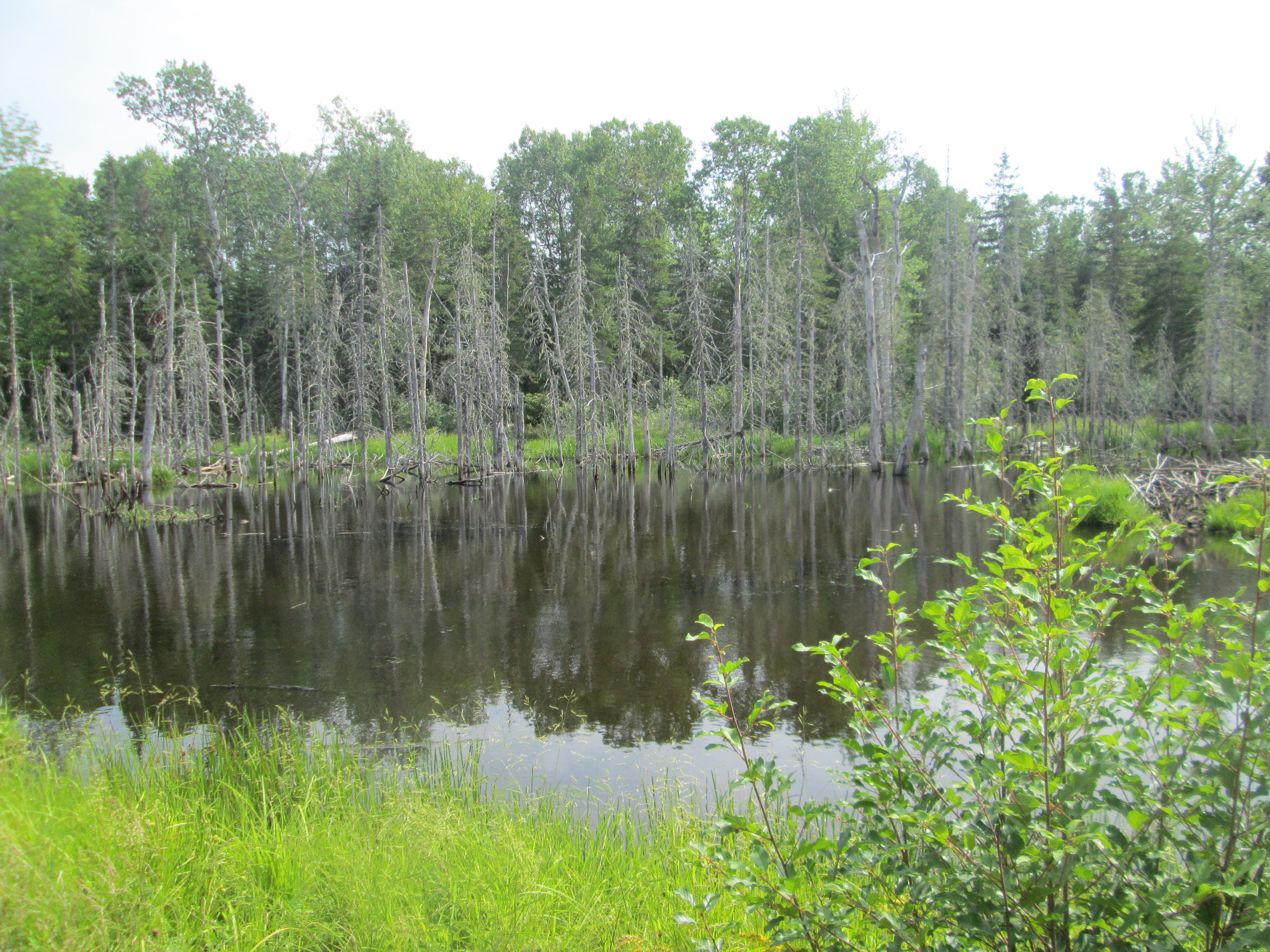
Wetlands in Nova Scotia, Canada

Canadian wetlands account for approximately one quarter of the world's total wetlands and is ranked with the highest surface area of wetlands on the Ramsar Conventions List of Wetlands of International Importance. Canada holds 37 designated areas of International Importance which equates to approximately 13,086,767 hectares of land.

Wetlands play an important role in Canadian in ecosystem functioning as they protect coastal areas from erosion; regulate water from large floods; prevent toxic sediments and substances from getting into groundwater; provide habitats for various species; participate and contribute to the water cycle; and serve as a natural storage base for carbon. It is wetlands that provide productive habitats with high species diversity and nutrient cycling in comparison to many other ecosystems. In addition to ecological functions, wetlands contribute to socio-economic frameworks in Canada such as hunting, trapping and fishing; tourism and recreation; domestic peat energy source and resource for peat; provide materials for forest products; and account for some natural heritage areas.

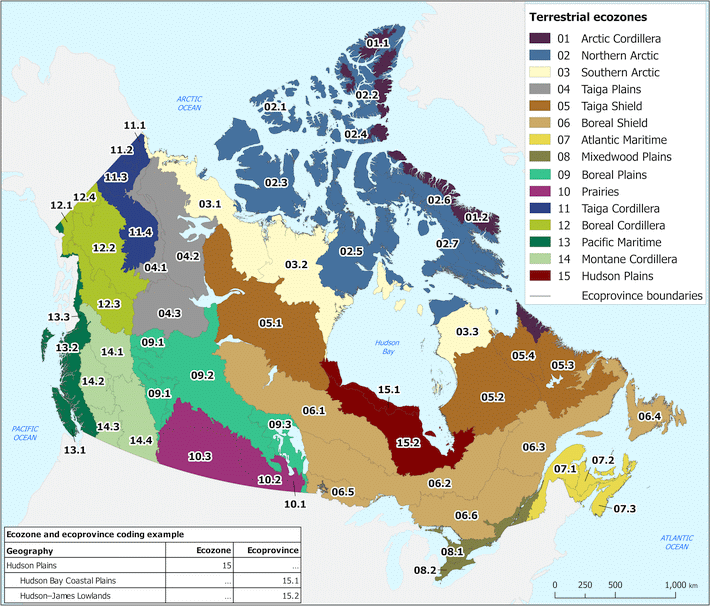
Ecozones in Canada

== History ==
The first national wetland policy of Canada is The Federal Policy on Wetland Conservation which was established in 1991. It came to fruition after Environment Canada developed a statement on wetlands issues in Canada in 1986 and early 1987. The management and protection of wetlands in Canada was deemed a significant land use issue by the Federal-Provincial Committee on Land Use (FPCLU) which stemmed from Canada's involvement with the Ramsar Convention. Key proposals from the convention included the establishment of wetland conservation policies to address legislative needs, improve knowledge and awareness of wetland functions, and to have continuous monitoring of wetlands in Canada.

In April 1990, a national policy conference was held termed the "Sustaining Wetlands Forum" which included Federal government, non-government, and industry groups such as Ducks Unlimited Canada, Wildlife Habitat Canada, and the Round Table on the Environment and the Economy. This forum provoked a series of recommendations, including the incorporation of policies within all jurisdictions in Canada to better conserve wetlands by 1991. In addition, national consultations were conducted during summer 1990 which found widespread public support for incorporating wetlands into Canadian conservations needs and the necessity to reclaim and protect wetlands within Canada.

== Wetlands in Canadian Ecozones ==
Wetlands can be found in Canada's broad ranges of ecozones spanning across the provinces and territories. In Canada, there is approximately 1.29 million km^{2} of wetlands which in turn covers 13% of Canada's terrestrial area. Canadian wetlands are predominantly located within the Boreal Shield which accounts for 25% of the existing wetland habitats. Other localities with high percentages of wetland occurrence include the Hudson Plains (21%) and Boreal Plains (18%). Specifically, it is the Hudson Plains terrestrial habitats that are mainly constituted of wetlands. The major wetlands in Canada extend from central Labrador to south of Hudson Bay in addition to northwest of the Mackenzie River delta.

| Ecozone | Wetland Area (km^{2}) |
|---|---|
| Arctic Cordillera | 17,650 |
| Northern Arctic | 79,065 |
| Southern Arctic | 97,448 |
| Taiga Plains | 255,276 |
| Taiga Shield | 358,051 |
| Boreal Shield | 470,588 |
| Atlantic Maritime | 8128 |
| Mixedwood Plains | 4,723 |
| Boreal Plains | 202,455 |
| Prairies | 2,3269 |
| Taiga Cordillera | 6,682 |
| Boreal Cordillera | 13,908 |
| Pacific Maritime | 2,371 |
| Montane Cordillera | 74,109 |
| Hudson Plains | 292,109 |
| Tundra Cordillera | 5,495 |
| Semi-Arid Plateaux | 1,192 |
| Atlantic Highlands | 2,792 |

== Canadian Wetland Classification System (CWCS) ==
The Canadian Wetland Classification System (CWCS) is based on wetland functions and interrelationships between abiotic and biotic constituents of wetland habitats. These interrelationships determine the resulting implications and characteristics of hydrology, climate, vegetation interactions, and water quality which are important considerations for deciding how to manage and conserve different wetland environments.

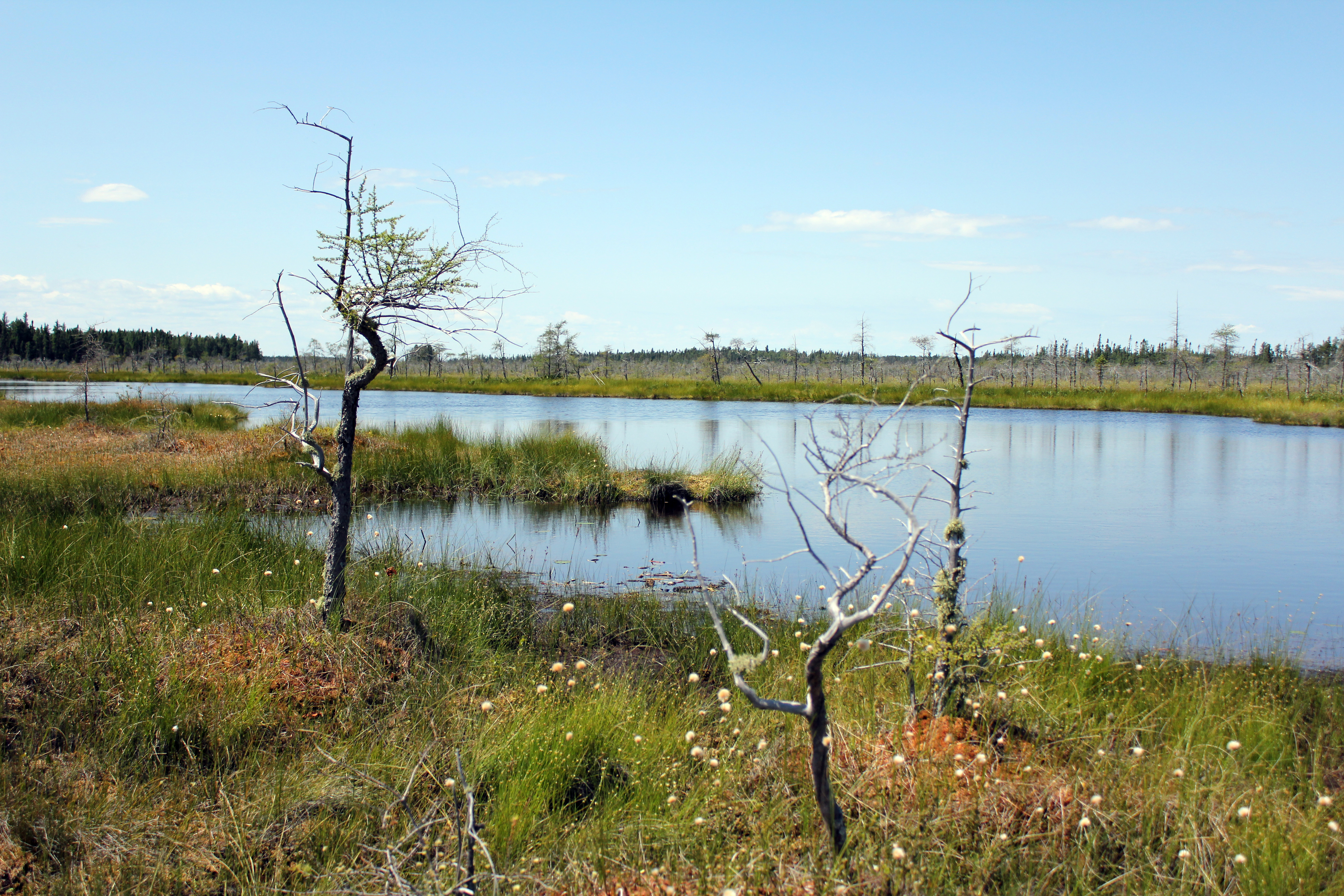
Bog in Quebec, Canada

The CWCS has a hierarchical structure which is composed of wetland class, wetland form, and wetland type. The broadest category is the wetland class which recognizes the genetic origin of each specific wetland ecosystem. This consists of bogs, fens, swamps, marshes, and shallow waters. These are determined by examining abiotic parameters including hydrologic regime, mineral material, water chemistry, and the interaction of these functions with biota to form vegetation cover or peat. Wetland forms are determined by assessing wetland ecosystems surface morphology and pattern, water quality, relationship to open water, and the underlying mineral soil morphology. Lastly, wetland types are determined by investigating the wetland ecosystems vegetation physiognomy.

Wetland Classes
| Class | Description | Water Table | Water Sources | Vegetation | Soils | Subforms |
|---|---|---|---|---|---|---|
| Bog | Peat landform, raised or level with surrounding terrain | At or slightly below bog surface | Precipitation, fog, and snowmelt | Treed or treeless, usually covered with sphagnum, shrubs, lichens | Mesisols, and Organic Cryosols | Blanket bog, Collapse scar bog, Domed bog, Flat bog, Lowland polygon bog, Mound bog, Palsa bog, Peat mound bog, Peat plateau bog, Plateau bog, Polygonal peat plateau bog, Riparian bog, Slope bog, String bog, Veneer bog |
| Fen | Peatland with fluctuating water table, groundwater, and surface water presence | Fluctuating | Channels, pools and other open water bodies form surface flow patterns | Decomposed sedge and brown moss peats | Mesisols, Humisols, and organic Cryosols | Basin fen, Channel fen, Collapse scar fen, Feather fen, Horizontal fen, Lowland polygon fen, Palsa fen, Riparian fen, Slope fen, Snowpatch fen, Spring fen, String fen |
| Marsh | Shallow water fluctuating daily, seasonally or annually | Water table is at or below soil surface | Water from surrounding surface runoff, stream inflow, precipitation, storm surges, groundwater discharge, longshore currents, and tidal action | Vegetation includes aquatic macrophytes, rushes, reeds, grasses, sedges, shrubs, moss, liverworts, algae | Humic, Rego Gleysols, Humisols, Mesisols | Basin marsh, Estuarine marsh, Hummock marsh, Lacustrine marsh, Riparian marsh. Slope marsh, Spring marsh, Tidal marsh |
| Swamp | Forested or wooded wetlands and peatlands; Highly decomposed woody peat and organic material | Water table at or below the surface | Lakes, streams, storm surges, surface runoff | Treed or tall shrub dominated; Tall woody vegetation, 30% covered, wood-rich peat | Gleysol, Mesisols, Humisols | Discharge swamp, Flat swamp, Inland salt swamp, Mineral-wise swamp, Raised peatland swamp, Riparian swamp, Slope swamp, Tidal swamp |
| Shallow Water | Wetlands transitional between saturated wetlands or seasonally wet deep water bodies; Can be called ponds, shallow lakes, oxbows, sloughs, or channels | Water table below the surface | Lacustrine, fluvial, tidal, stream, river and permafrost systems | Vegetation includes limnic peat, mixed limnic organic-mineral material, and marl | N/A | Basin water, Estuarine water, Lacustrine water, Riparian water, Tidal water |

== Wetland loss ==
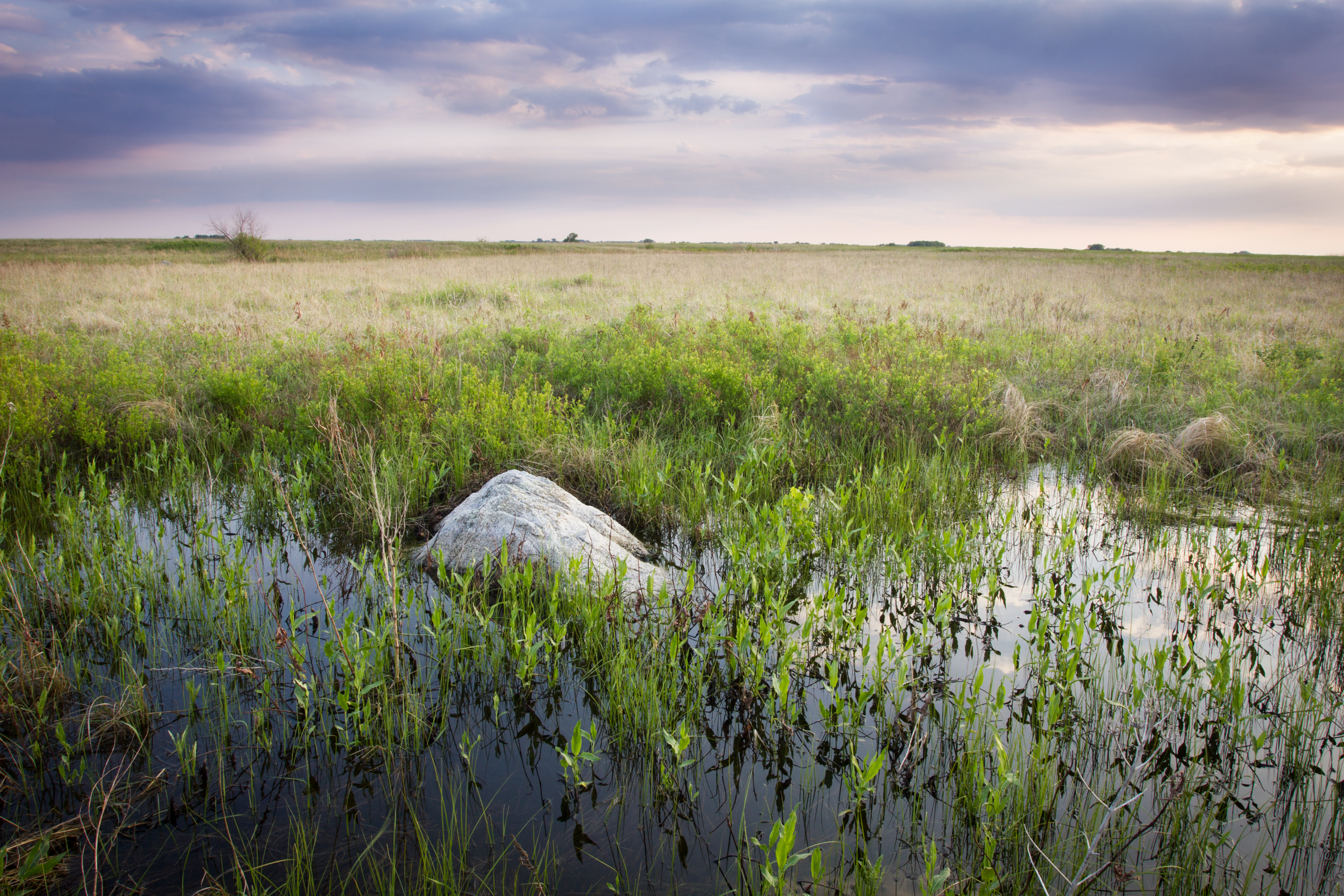
Tallgrass wetland

Since the onset of colonization the total wetland area in Canada has decreased by 15%. This equates to approximately 20 million hectares or one seventh of Canada's total wetland areas. In 1991, the Minister of Environment estimated 65% of Atlantic coastal salt marshes have been eradicated; 80 to 98% of wetlands adjacent or completely within urban centres have been destroyed; 68% of wetlands in southern Ontario have been lost; and 70% of Pacific estuary marshes have been degraded. This exhibits the necessity for implementing and establishing more wetland policies and frameworks within the Canadian political framework.

== Policies by province ==
The Federal Policy on Wetland Conservation is applied on federal lands which constitutes approximately 29% of Canada's wetlands. As such, the majority of wetlands within Canada are not protected under this policy which subsequently lies on the provincial or territorial policies and guidelines for protection. Most provinces and territories have implemented a wetland management program but not all have wetland conservations policies in place to protect wetlands. This is due in part to The Federal Policy on Wetland Conservation being depicted as a partnership between provincial and territorial governments in combination with private sections.

The policies, frameworks, guidelines, and strategies for wetland management and protection vary nationally in Canada.

| Jurisdiction | Act, policy, or regulations | Description |
|---|---|---|
| International | Ramsar Convention on Wetlands | Multilateral agreement led by Environment and Climate Change Canada; global nature conservation on the wise us of all wetlands through local and national actions; Canada has 37 designated Wetlands of International Importance under the Convention |
| International | The North American Waterfowl Management Plan | Tri-national agreement with the United States and Mexico; conserves waterfowl and wetland habitats with collaborative management and conservation |
| Federal | The Federal Policy on Wetland Conservation | Federal policy on wetland conservation; no net loss wetlands; protection, restoration, and management of Canadian wetlands |
| Federal | Fisheries Act | Prevents the harmful alteration of wetlands that would disrupt or destruct fish habitats |
| Federal | Canada Wildlife Act | Covers the creation, management, and protection of wildlife areas; preserves critical habitats, including wetlands |
| Federal | Navigation Protection Act | Prohibits navigability of water; canal or body or water created or altered due to construction of any work |
| British Columbia | Riparian Areas Regulation | Protection of riparian areas features, functions, and conditions essential for maintaining stream health and productivity; under the Fish Protection Act |
| British Columbia | Forest Range Practices Act | Governs the management of forest and range resources; riparian area management; considerations of wetlands in forest development planning |
| British Columbia | Water Sustainability Act | Ensures the sustainable supply of fresh and clean water; requires approval for alterations of streams, lakes, or wetlands |
| British Columbia | Environmental Assessment Act | Assess major projects and their potential impacts on the environment, including wetlands |
| Alberta | Alberta Wetland Policy | Maintaining wetland areas to ensure healthy watersheds with safe and secure drinking water; ecological, social, and economic benefits of wetlands maintained |
| Alberta | Alberta Water Act | Governs the management of water in Alberta; promotes conservation and management of water and wetlands; balances with economic growth |
| Alberta | Environmental Protection and Enhancement Act | Determines requirement for environmental impact assessments; wetland reclamation, conservation easements, wastewater, storm drainage, and substance release |
| Alberta | Public Lands Act | Crown ownership of beds and shores of all permanent and naturally occurring bodies of water (wetlands, rivers, streams, watercourses, and lakes) |
| Saskatchewan | Environmental Management and Protection Regulations | Considerations of adjacent wetlands and the interconnectivity of wetlands with other water courses |
| Saskatchewan | Saskatchewan Watershed Authority Act | Conservation, preservation, and management of wetlands |
| Manitoba | The Sustainable Watersheds Act | Regulates the use and management of water which includes the protection of wetlands and other water bodies |
| Ontario | Provincial Policy Statement | Prohibits development and alteration of provincially significant wetlands; protection of Great Lakes coastal wetlands; development and site alteration is prohibited near provincially significant wetlands |
| Ontario | Conservation Authorities Act | Prohibits some activities within wetlands; restricting and regulating the use of water in or from wetlands |
| Ontario | Environmental Protection Act | Surface and groundwater considerations; regulates and controls pollutants that may affect wetlands |
| Ontario | Wetland Conservation Strategy for Ontario | Provincial policy for wetland conservation and management in Ontario; promote protection, restoration, and awareness of wetlands |
| Quebec | Environmental Quality Act | Integrated management of wetlands; prevention of loss of wetlands and bodies of water; compensation measures for loss of wetlands |
| Quebec | The Water Act | Aims for no net loss of wetlands and water bodies; respect for the conservation of wetlands and waterbodies in Quebec; under the Act respecting the conservation of wetlands and bodies of water |
| Quebec | Plan régionaux des milieux humides et hydriques | Conservation of wetlands and bodies of water in land use planning including an action plan and follow-up measures |
| Nova Scotia | Wetland Conservation Policy | Framework for conservation and management of wetland; communicates the importance of wetlands; balance of sustainable economic growth |
| Nova Scotia | Environment Act | Regulations on infilling or altering wetlands; authorizations, restrictions or prohibiting the alternation of wetlands and water courses |
| Nova Scotia | Forestry Act | Mandatory methods and standards for sustainable forest management practices to protect wetlands |
| Prince Edward Island | Water Act | Supports and promotes the management, protection, and enhancement of wetlands; investigating adverse effects or ensuring compliance with threats to wetlands |
| Prince Edward Island | Wildlife Conservation Act | Regulate the standards for the preservation and management of certain designated wetlands with historical and biological value |
| Prince Edward Island | Environmental Protection Act | Exclusive control over the quality, use, protection or alternation of wetlands; categorization of wetlands |
| New Brunswick | Wetland Conservation Policy | Provincially significant wetlands habitats ensure no net loss; wetland functions larger than 1 hectare in size protected |
| New Brunswick | Clean Water Act | Protect the quality and quantity of wetlands through conservation and protection; water management plans for wetlands |
| Newfoundland & Labrador | Water Resources Act | Permits developments in wetlands that do not cause adverse effects on water quantity, water quality, hydrologic functions, and terrestrial and aquatic habitats in wetlands |
| Newfoundland & Labrador | Policy for Development in Wetlands | Criteria for issuing permits under Section 48 of the Water Resources Act for all development activities in and affecting wetlands |
| Newfoundland & Labrador | Environmental Protection Act | Regulations and guidelines related to wetland conservation and protection; environmental assessment processes for evaluating potential environmental impacts on wetlands due to proposed activities |
| Yukon | A Policy for the Stewardship of Yukon Wetlands | Protect most important wetlands; improve knowledge of wetlands; manage and minimize impacts on wetlands |
| Northwest Territories | The Waters Act | Management and protection of water resources, including wetlands; regulate activities related to water use and management; protection of wetlands |
| Northwest Territories | Environmental Rights Act | Protects the integrity, biological diversity, and productivity of ecosystems, including wetlands |
| Nunavut | Nunavut Waters and Nunavut Surface rights Tribunal Act | Regulation of the use of water and surface resources; policies and guidelines for water management |
| Nunavut | Nunavut Planning and Project Assessment Act | Implements environmental assessments for proposed development to determining impacts on wetlands amongst other environmental components |
| Nunavut | Wildlife Act | Management and protection of wildlife populations and habitats, including wetlands; assess the need to conserve and management wetlands for wildlife populations |

== Issues ==
Wetland law and policy within North America is reliant on the implementation of the "mitigation sequence" which includes avoidance, minimization, compensation, and restoration for any alterations to wetlands. However, achieving and executing avoidance within the mitigation sequence has been broadly argued by scholars, scientists, policy-makers, and regulators to be dismissed with wetland protection. The total avoidance of impacts on wetlands in Canada can be boiled down to 5 key factors central to the failure of decision-makers to prioritize avoidance and minimization within the mitigation sequence. A 2011 Wetlands Ecology and Management article suggests the following issues:

=== What constitutes "avoidance" on wetlands ===
Varying interpretations of what constitutes "avoidance" coupled with a scarcity of standardized methods or guidelines for interpreting and following regulatory requirements in Canada has led to suboptimal protection of wetlands. As such, Clare et al. (2011) suggests, "The language that allows compensation if avoidance or minimization 'is not practicable becomes a de facto loophole in its non-specificity, allowing developers to skirt the intent of the law and move directly to compensation". This is enabled by the high degrees of subjective interpretations which catalyzes inconsistent decision-making and uncertainty within and between jurisdictions in Canada.

=== Land use planning approaches fail to identify and prioritize the protection of wetlands ===
The permitting of incremental wetland loss can be seen by the negligence of incorporating and recognizing wetlands in development planning. This leads to conservation, protection, or restoration strategies inadequate to prevent the degradation of wetlands. As such, Clare et al., (2011) argues, "Designating ecologically significant wetlands in advance of development would allow for the avoidance of high priority sites, thereby connecting larger regional management goals (and ecological function), with site-by-site permitting decisions" (p 170). In addition to this, divergent goals between regulators and decision-makers in regards to wetland management can further wetland degradation. Without the presence of coordinated planning on the protection of wetlands there may be vulnerable localities of wetlands that may face future incursions from development.

=== Undermining wetlands protection due to monetary valuation ===
The formulation of market-based instruments has re-focused policy and decision-makers' considerations from avoiding and minimizing wetland impacts towards a more permissive orientation based on exchange values of wetland functions. Wetland area and ecosystem services are intangible and their intrinsic necessity for anthropogenic functioning has been undermined by the emergence of wetland banking and in-lieu fee payments. This is in part due to the more immediate wealth associated with developments directly related to economic prosperity which often result in the degradation of wetland functions. As such, the monetary tools established for defining wetland ecosystem services exist but their understanding for ecosystem goods and services are poorly understood and followed. Furthermore, the abstraction of wetland functions and services through monetary valuation undermines the connectivity of wetlands to broader ecological functions.

=== A "techno-arrogance" perception of wetlands creation and restoration which permits an increase in wetland destruction ===
The advancement in wetland creation and restoration in North America permits the notion that constructed wetlands that visually resemble naturally occurring wetlands can be adequate compensation measures. However, these advancements with engineering and heavy equipment that aim to mimic naturally occurring wetlands often fail to consider the multitude of variables contributing to wetland functioning such as wetland soils, hydrologic regimes, riparian zones, and water chemistry. As such, the undermining of wetland complexity to means of compensation and construction neglects the intrinsic values and functions of natural wetlands. Compensation, restoration, and construction of wetlands through offset wetland policies may have issues in creating equivalency of the ecological, social, and economic values associated with naturally occurring wetlands.

=== Compensation policies and requirements fail to be enforced by decision-makers ===
The implementation of compliance and enforcement is necessary to prevent violations on the alteration and destruction of wetlands prior to governmental permitting and approvals. Violations by permit-holders or proponents may be due in part to proponents' ignorance to the wetland policies and laws in addition to the governmental necessity to fund monitoring to ensure conditions are being followed as outlined in permits. If governments fail to oversee compliance through follow-up measures the accountability of permit holders can be lost. As such, the enactment of compensation over avoidance can seem much easier and more economically intuitive than avoidance mitigation measures for proponents. This can be improved by the enhancement of regulatory agencies follow-up and monitoring to ensure proponents are following wetland protection guidelines. In addition, the coordination of wetland policies within and between jurisdictions can aid in achieving better compliance.

== Improvement methods ==
Greater compliance, transparency,fd and consistency within jurisdictions can aid in improving policies and regulations regarding wetlands in Canada. The existing technical knowledge on the importance of wetland for humans and ecological functions can be incorporated into refining methodologies for valuing and managing wetlands. This can assist in wetland conservation and compliance within existing policies. In a 1998 review of Canadian wetland policy, Jonathan Scarth outlines policy instruments and research needs to best protect and conserve wetlands in Canada, identifying as toolsscience communication, land use incentives and disincentives, public acquisition of land, and land use regulation.
