= Mukri, Estonia =

Village in Estonia

Coordinates: 58°43′N 25°02′E

Mukri
- Village
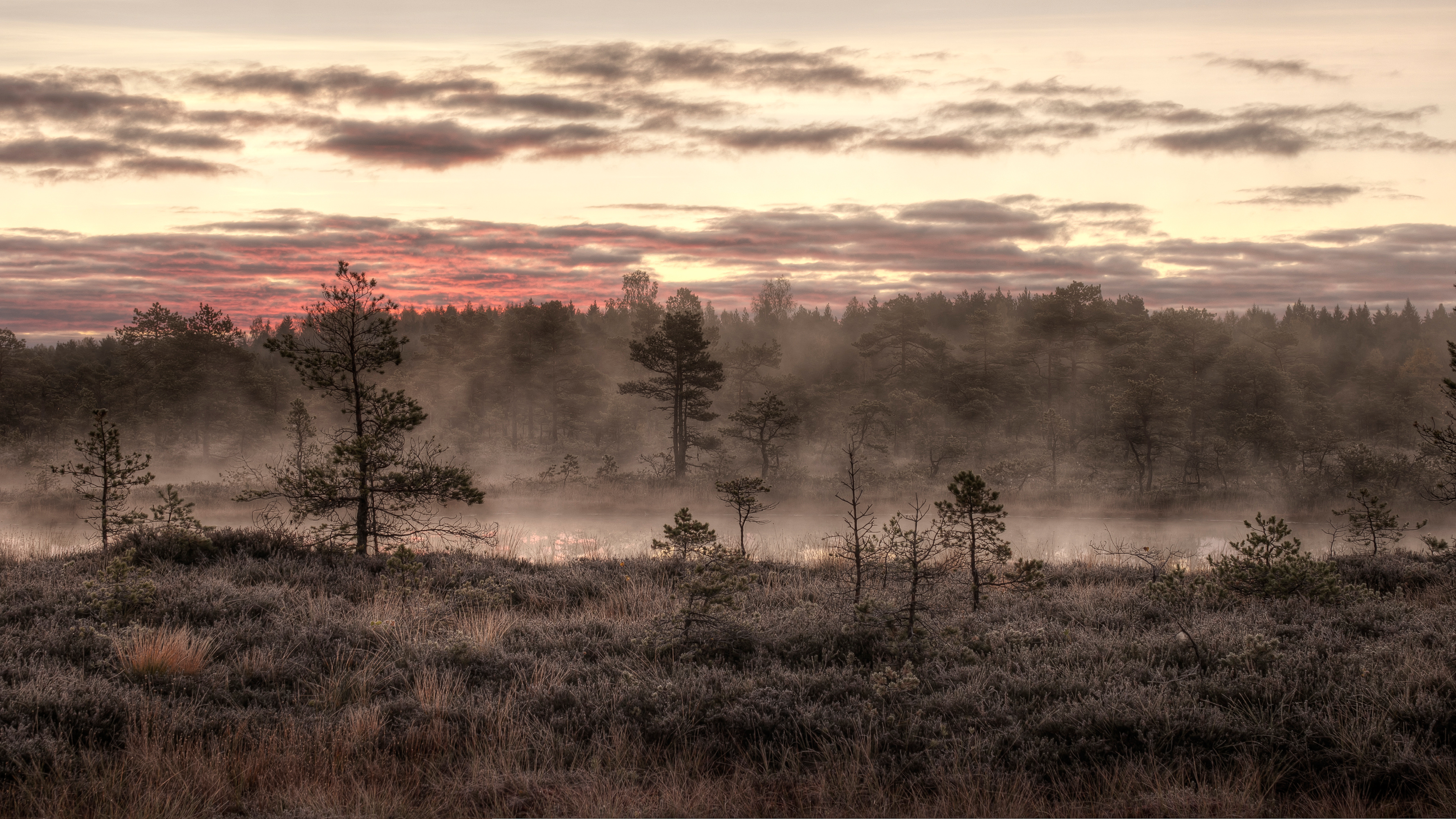
- Mukri Bog near the village
- Interactive map of Mukri
- Country: Estonia
- County: Rapla County
- Parish: Kehtna Parish
- Time zone: UTC+2 (EET)
  - Summer (DST): UTC+3 (EEST)

Mukri is a village in Kehtna Parish, Rapla County in northern-central Estonia.
