= Navua River =

River in Fiji

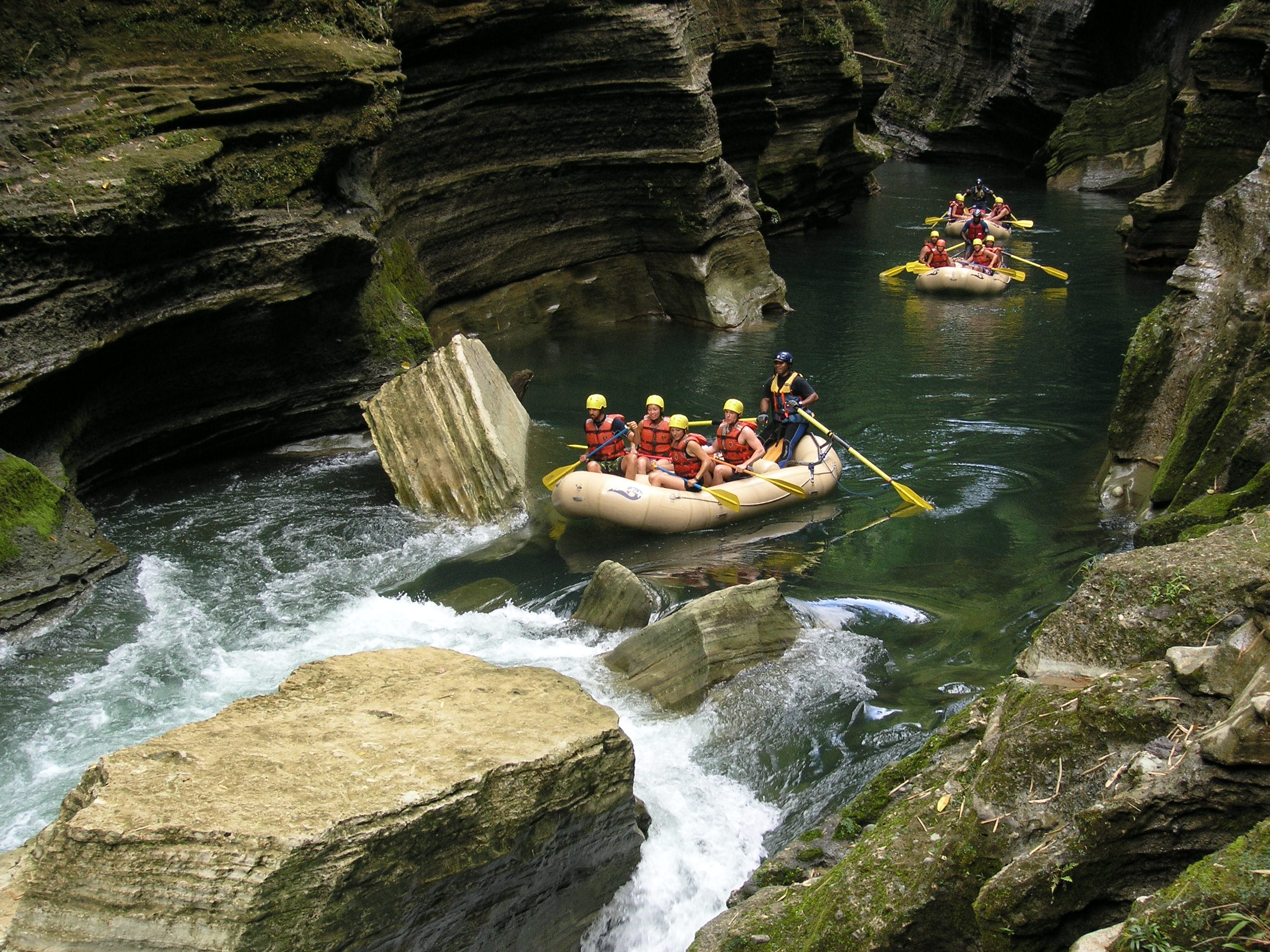

- Location of mouth

Location
- Country: Fiji
- Island: Viti Levu

Physical characteristics
- Mouth
  - coordinates: 18.259455288893083°S 178.1530899024746°E
- Length: 65 km (40 mi)

== Navua River Facts ==
The Navua River is located in the island of Viti Levu in Fiji and has its source on the south east slope of Mount Gordon and flows for 65 kilometers to the south coast. It is noted for the rugged mountain country through which it flows. In the late 19th century, a sugar mill was built on the banks of this river, and although the mill was shut down in 1923, the town of Navua stands on its site.

== Upper Navua Conservation Area ==
The Upper Navua Conservation Area is an area in the central highlands of Viti Levu where the Navua River passes through a narrow gorge. It is managed by the Fiji Native Land Trust Board. The area was listed as a "Wetland of International Importance" under the Ramsar Convention on April 11, 2006. To value the uniqueness of this beautiful place, Nate and Kelly Bricker created a conservation area. “They believed that tourism would be the best to replace natural resource extraction as a source of revenue for locals.” They “developed Rivers Fiji guides which educate guests about the ecosystem, heritage sites and local preservation issues.” The conservation was established in 2000 and since then it has become a key conservation area, protecting the river from logging, road building, and mining. These efforts have not only helped the Navua river but has been a crucial element of contributing the local economy through eco-tourism. This conservation encompasses 615 hectares, including the river and a buffer zone. Overall, UNCA focuses on ensuring that other individuals recognize the importance of taking care of rivers, such as the Navua river, the conservation area has proven how they are actually beneficial and has produced numerous benefits towards the Fiji Rivers, it has created a global recognition to tourists about the critical impacts of human activities.

== Impact of Human Activities on Navua river ==
Unfortunately human activity has increasingly become a factor to "disasters" that occur worldwide, especially in small islands such as the Navua river has been affected. Humans activities such as deforestation, increased population, and land degradation have contributed to the increase of flooding on the past 100 years until 2004. One may wonder, how does deforestation cause increase flooding? Well that is due to the reduction of the river's capacity to absorb water. The Navua River has experienced major flood roughly every 7 years, while minor floods are more frequent. Human activities don't only impact the local population but also lead to significant financial cost, for instance, one major flood in 2004 caused $13 million in damage. When flooding occurs damage tends to occur in homes, agricultural land, and infrastructure. This results in high repair and rebuilding costs, which can strain local and national economies.

== Community Engagement towards Navua River ==
Multiple complaints have been raised with the Prime Minister concerning the gravel extraction in the Navua River. Due to the shallower upstream it has made it difficult for locals to transport in boats towards their villages and communities. Not only has the extraction caused a affect in transportation but also caused a concern in the ecosystem. It has been reported that food sources, such as eels, mussels and fish have decreased due to the extraction operations. It has been issued that these gravel extractions are often unauthorized, which is causing a irreversible damage. A river Tubing Manager Director, called William Danford has also raised concerns saying there has been various reports about the issue and still no notable measures have been taken to find out a solution for this.
