= Mayoral elections in Petone =

Elections were held at regular times in Petone from its proclamation as a borough in 1888 to its abolition in 1989. Elections were held annually until 1915 when two year terms were introduced which lasted until 1935 when the mayoral term was extended to three years. The polling was conducted using the standard first-past-the-post electoral method.

== Election results ==
=== July 1888 election ===
1888 Petone mayoral election
Party	Candidate	Votes	%	±%
Independent	Samuel Raymond Johnson	102	65.38	
Independent	John Stansell	54	34.62	
Majority		48	30.76	
Turnout		156	56.52	

=== November 1888 election ===
Samuel Raymond Johnson was re-elected mayor unopposed.

=== 1889 election ===
1889 Petone mayoral election
Party	Candidate	Votes	%	±%
Independent	Richard Clement Kirk	95	40.59	
Independent	William Henry Cook	79	33.76	
Independent	Richard Mothes	60	25.64	
Majority		16	6.83	
Turnout		234		

=== 1890 election ===
Richard Clement Kirk was re-elected mayor unopposed.

=== 1891 election ===
1891 Petone mayoral election
Party	Candidate	Votes	%	±%
Independent	Richard Mothes	105	58.01	
Independent	George Thomas London	76	41.98	
Majority		29	16.02	
Turnout		181		

=== 1892 election ===
1892 Petone mayoral election
Party	Candidate	Votes	%	±%
Independent	Richard Clement Kirk	160	60.83	
Independent	Samuel Raymond Johnson	103	39.16	
Majority		57	21.67	
Turnout		263		

=== 1893 election ===
1893 Petone mayoral election
Party	Candidate	Votes	%	±%
Independent	Richard Clement Kirk	140	53.43	−7.40
Independent	Richard Mothes	122	46.56	
Majority		18	6.87	−14.80
Turnout		262		

=== 1894 election ===
Richard Clement Kirk was re-elected mayor unopposed.

=== 1895 election ===
Richard Clement Kirk was re-elected mayor unopposed.

=== 1896 election ===
Richard Clement Kirk was re-elected mayor unopposed.

=== 1897 election ===
Richard Clement Kirk was re-elected mayor unopposed.

=== 1898 election ===
Richard Clement Kirk was re-elected mayor unopposed.

=== 1899 election ===
Richard Clement Kirk was re-elected mayor unopposed.

=== 1901 election ===
1901 Petone mayoral election
Party	Candidate	Votes	%	±%
Independent	Richard Mothes	414	50.73	
Independent	Richard Clement Kirk	396	48.52	
Informal votes		6	0.73	
Majority		18	2.20	
Turnout		816		

=== 1902 election ===
1902 Petone mayoral election
Party	Candidate	Votes	%	±%
Independent	Richard Mothes	445	61.46	+10.73
Independent	James Toomath	279	38.53	
Majority		166	22.92	+20.72
Turnout		724		

=== 1903 election ===
1903 Petone mayoral election
Party	Candidate	Votes	%	±%
Independent	George Thomas London	541	62.61	
Independent	Richard Mothes	323	37.38	−24.08
Majority		219	25.34	
Turnout		864		

=== 1904 election ===
1904 Petone mayoral election
Party	Candidate	Votes	%	±%
Independent	George Thomas London	720	63.66	+1.05
Independent	Alex Fraser	411	36.33	
Informal votes		4	0.35	
Majority		309	27.32	+1.98
Turnout		1,131		

=== 1905 election ===
George Thomas London was re-elected mayor unopposed.

=== 1906 election ===
1906 Petone mayoral election
Party	Candidate	Votes	%	±%
Independent	George Thomas London	363	50.06	
Independent	Henry Findlay	360	49.65	
Informal votes		2	0.27	
Majority		3	0.41	
Turnout		725		

=== 1907 election ===
1907 Petone mayoral election
Party	Candidate	Votes	%	±%
Independent	John William McEwan	684	64.83	
Independent	Richard Mothes	363	34.40	
Informal votes		8	0.75	
Majority		321	30.42	
Turnout		1,055		

=== 1908 election ===
John William McEwan was re-elected mayor unopposed.

=== 1909 election ===
John William McEwan was re-elected mayor unopposed.

=== 1910 election ===
John William McEwan was re-elected mayor unopposed.

=== 1911 election ===
John William McEwan was re-elected mayor unopposed.

=== 1912 election ===
1912 Petone mayoral election
Party	Candidate	Votes	%	±%
Independent	John William McEwan	1,123	72.21	
Independent	Joseph Piper	421	27.07	
Informal votes		11	0.70	
Majority		702	45.14	
Turnout		1,555		

=== 1913 election ===
John William McEwan was re-elected mayor unopposed.

=== 1914 election ===
John William McEwan was re-elected mayor unopposed.

=== 1915 election ===
John William McEwan was re-elected mayor unopposed.

=== 1917 election ===
1917 Petone mayoral election
Party	Candidate	Votes	%	±%
Independent	John William McEwan	1,861	71.60	
Labour	Alexander Anderson	717	27.58	
Informal votes		21	0.80	
Majority		1,144	44.01	
Turnout		2,599		

=== 1919 election ===
1919 Petone mayoral election
Party	Candidate	Votes	%	±%
Independent	John William McEwan	1,079	52.58	−19.02
Independent	George Thomas London	951	46.34	
Informal votes		22	1.07	+0.27
Majority		128	6.23	−37.78
Turnout		2,052		

=== 1921 election ===
1921 Petone mayoral election
Party	Candidate	Votes	%	±%
Independent	John William McEwan	1,021	45.86	−6.72
Labour	David McKenzie	640	28.75	
Independent	Albert Pere	565	25.38	
Majority		381	17.11	
Turnout		2,226		

=== 1923 election ===
1923 Petone mayoral election
Party	Candidate	Votes	%	±%
Independent	John William McEwan	1,280	65.23	+19.37
Independent	Albert Pere	653	33.28	+7.90
Informal votes		29	1.47	
Majority		627	31.95	+14.84
Turnout		1,962		

=== 1925 election ===
1925 Petone mayoral election
Party	Candidate	Votes	%	±%
Independent	John William McEwan	1,480	57.88	−7.35
Independent	George Thomas London	1,077	42.12	
Majority		403	15.76	−16.19
Turnout		2,557	44.05	

=== 1927 election ===
1927 Petone mayoral election
Party	Candidate	Votes	%	±%
Independent	David McKenzie	1,740	63.94	
Civic League	George Cook	944	34.69	
Informal votes		37	1.35	
Majority		796	29.25	
Turnout		2,721		

=== 1929 election ===
David McKenzie was re-elected mayor unopposed.

=== 1931 election ===
David McKenzie was re-elected mayor unopposed.

=== 1933 election ===
1933 Petone mayoral election
Party	Candidate	Votes	%	±%
Independent	David McKenzie	1,787	43.02	
Independent	John William McEwan	566	19.94	
Civic League	George Findlay	457	16.10	
Informal votes		28	0.98	
Majority		1,221	43.02	
Turnout		2,838		

=== 1934 election ===
Mayor David McKenzie died on 2 October 1934. A by-election was avoided when the council decided to elect one of its own members to serve the remainder of the term. The deputy mayor, Albert Scholefield, was elected unanimously at a council meeting on 8 October 1934.

=== 1935 election ===
1935 Petone mayoral election
Party	Candidate	Votes	%	±%
Labour	Albert Scholefield	1,266	37.21	
Independent	John William McEwan	1,052	30.92	+10.98
Citizens	John Campbell Burns	607	17.84	
Independent	Edward Norman Campbell	399	11.72	
Informal votes		78	2.29	+1.31
Majority		214	6.29	
Turnout		3,402		

=== 1938 election ===
1938 Petone mayoral election
Party	Candidate	Votes	%	±%
Citizens	George London	1,578	42.69	
Labour	Albert Scholefield	1,551	41.96	+4.75
Independent	David Dickson	526	14.23	
Informal votes		41	1.10	−1.19
Majority		27	0.73	
Turnout		3,696		

=== 1941 election ===
George London was re-elected mayor unopposed.

=== 1944 election ===
1944 Petone mayoral election
Party	Candidate	Votes	%	±%
Citizens	Harold Green	2,226	50.94	
Labour	James Cumming	2,038	46.64	
Informal votes		65	1.48	
Majority		188	4.30	
Turnout		4,369		

=== 1947 election ===
1947 Petone mayoral election
Party	Candidate	Votes	%	±%
Citizens	Alec MacFarlane	2,348	50.07	
Labour	James Cumming	2,306	49.17	+2.53
Informal votes		35	0.74	−0.74
Majority		42	0.89	
Turnout		4,689		

=== 1950 election ===
1950 Petone mayoral election
Party	Candidate	Votes	%	±%
Labour	Joe Huggan	2,164	52.30	
Citizens	Alec MacFarlane	1,952	47.18	−2.89
Informal votes		21	0.50	−0.24
Majority		212	5.12	
Turnout		4,137		

=== 1953 election ===
Joe Huggan was re-elected mayor unopposed.

=== 1956 election ===
Joe Huggan was re-elected mayor unopposed.

=== 1957 by-election ===
Annie Huggan was elected mayor unopposed.

=== 1959 election ===
Annie Huggan was re-elected mayor unopposed.

=== 1962 election ===
1962 Petone mayoral election
Party	Candidate	Votes	%	±%
Labour	Annie Huggan	1,789	59.49	
Citizens	Trevor Dick	1,199	39.87	
Informal votes		19	0.63	
Majority		590	19.62	
Turnout		3,007		

=== 1965 election ===
1965 Petone mayoral election
Party	Candidate	Votes	%	±%
Labour	Ralph Love	1,109	37.23	
Citizens	Trevor Dick	941	31.59	−8.28
Independent	Annie Huggan	751	25.21	−34.28
Independent	Peter Love	153	5.13	
Informal votes		24	0.80	+0.17
Majority		168	5.64	
Turnout		2,978	46.50	

=== 1967 by-election ===
1967 Petone mayoral by-election
Party	Candidate	Votes	%	±%
Labour	Ralph Love	1,249	49.36	+12.13
Independent	Tom Watson	1,034	40.86	
Informal votes		16	0.63	+0.17
Majority		215	8.49	+2.85
Turnout		2,530	39.50	−7.00

=== 1968 election ===
1968 Petone mayoral election
Party	Candidate	Votes	%	±%
United Petone	George Gee	1,859	58.14	
Labour	Ralph Love	1,311	41.00	−8.36
Informal votes		27	0.84	+0.21
Majority		548	17.14	
Turnout		3,197	49.92	+10.42

=== 1971 election ===
1971 Petone mayoral election
Party	Candidate	Votes	%	±%
United Petone	George Gee	2,090	72.84	+14.70
Citizens	William Hartley Kennedy	422	14.70	
Labour	George Highfield	333	11.60	
Informal votes		24	0.83	−0.01
Majority		1,668	58.13	+40.99
Turnout		2,869		

=== 1974 election ===
1974 Petone mayoral election
Party	Candidate	Votes	%	±%
United Petone	George Gee	1,878	68.34	−4.50
Labour	George Highfield	816	29.70	+18.10
Informal votes		54	1.96	+1.13
Majority		1,062	38.64	−19.49
Turnout		2,748		

=== 1977 election ===
1977 Petone mayoral election
Party	Candidate	Votes	%	±%
United Petone	George Gee	1,579	52.04	−16.30
Labour	Jim Allen	1,406	46.34	
Informal votes		49	1.61	−0.35
Majority		173	5.70	−32.94
Turnout		3,034		

=== 1980 election ===
1980 Petone mayoral election
Party	Candidate	Votes	%	±%
United Petone	Ron Marston	901	39.22	
Labour	Patricia Alexander	716	31.17	
Independent	Jim Allen	680	29.60	−16.74
Majority		185	8.05	
Turnout		2,297		

=== 1983 election ===
1983 Petone mayoral election
Party	Candidate	Votes	%	±%
United Petone	Ron Marston	1,057	45.48	+6.26
Independent	Ted Woolf	843	36.27	
Labour	George Highfield	353	15.18	
Informal votes		71	3.05	
Majority		214	9.20	+1.15
Turnout		2,324		

=== 1986 election ===
1986 Petone mayoral election
Party	Candidate	Votes	%	±%
Independent	Ted Woolf	939	47.44	+11.17
Independent	Roy Hewson	709	35.82	
United Petone	Ron Marston	328	16.57	−28.91
Informal votes		3	0.15	−2.90
Majority		230	11.62	
Turnout		1,979	37.50	
