= 1927 Petone Borough Council election =

Local election in New Zealand

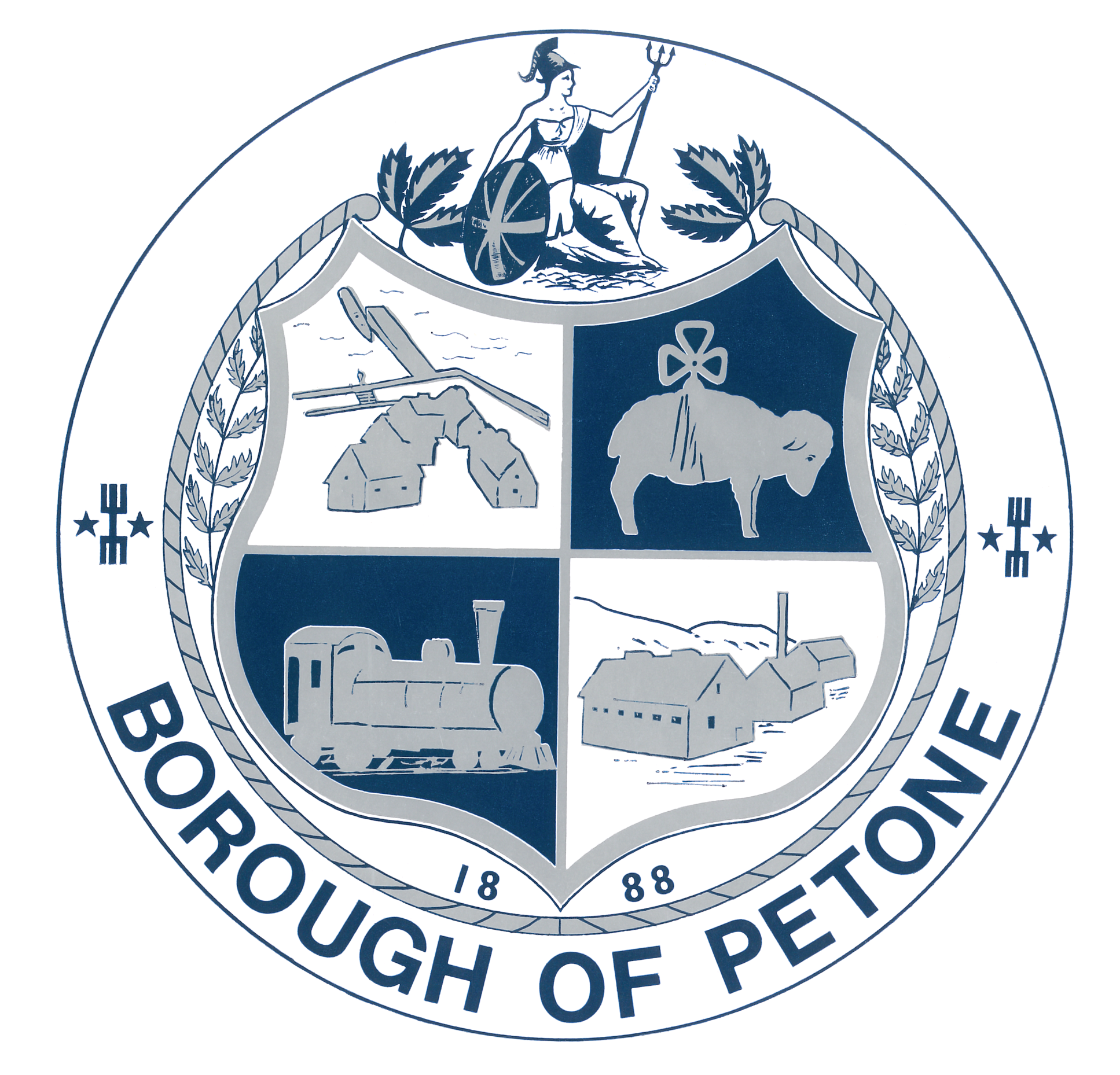
- 27 April 1927
- Turnout: 2,721
- Mayoral election
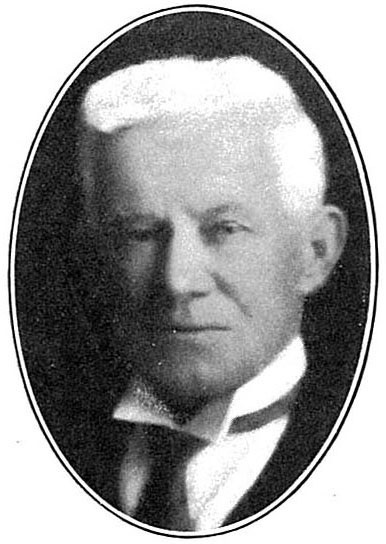

| Candidate | David McKenzie | George Cook |
| Party | Independent | Civic Association |
| Popular vote | 1,740 | 944 |
| Percentage | 63.94 | 34.69 |
Mayor before election
John William McEwan
Independent
Elected mayor
David McKenzie
Independent
- Council election
- 9 seats on the Petone Borough Council; 5 seats needed for a majority
| Party | Seats | +/– |
|---|---|---|
| Labour | 6 | +2 |
| Civic Association | 3 | −2 |
This lists parties that won seats. See the complete results below.

The 1927 Petone Borough Council election was a local election held on 27 April in the Petone, New Zealand, as part of that year's nation-wide local elections. Voters elected the Mayor of Petone and nine borough councillors for a two-year term. Polling booth voting and the first-past-the-post voting system were used.

== Background ==
The incumbent mayor, John William McEwan, declined to stand for a fifteenth term in office. Two candidates emerged to replace him.

== Candidates ==
George Cook

George Cook, the owner of a manufacturing company, had been a Petone Borough Councillor since 1919 and a member of the Petone Fire Board since 1920. After declaring his candidacy, Cook underwent a minor operation though it was not to effect his ability to campaign. He announced his candidature after John William McEwan had indicated he would not stand and was backed by the Civic Association.

David McKenzie

David McKenzie was a Scottish-born trade unionist and former employee of the Petone Woollen Works who had led a strike for better working conditions in 1916. He had previously been a borough councillor from 1915 to 1918. He had stood previously for mayor in 1921 against McEwan. Despite his long association with the Labour Party and trade unions, he ran as an independent candidate.

== Results ==
=== Mayoral election ===
1927 Petone mayoral election
| Party | Candidate | Votes | % | ±% |
|---|---|---|---|---|
| Independent | David McKenzie | 1,740 | 63.94 | |
| Civic Association | George Cook | 944 | 34.69 | |
| Informal votes | | 37 | 1.35 | |
| Majority | | 796 | 29.25 | |
| Turnout | | 2,721 | | |

=== Council election ===
1927 Petone Borough Council election
| Party | Candidate | Votes | % | ±% |
|---|---|---|---|---|
| Labour | Albert Scholefield | 1,892 | 69.53 | +23.62 |
| Labour | Edward Norman Campbell | 1,785 | 65.60 | +26.11 |
| Labour | William Edwards | 1,707 | 62.73 | +23.94 |
| Labour | James Cumming | 1,705 | 62.66 | |
| Labour | Denis McCarthy | 1,628 | 59.83 | +27.18 |
| Civic Association | Victor Jacobsen | 1,459 | 53.61 | −6.26 |
| Labour | James Ashby | 1,395 | 51.26 | |
| Civic Association | John Pearson | 1,302 | 47.85 | |
| Civic Association | John Longman | 1,294 | 47.55 | |
| Civic Association | Christopher Brocklebank | 1,208 | 44.39 | +5.56 |
| Civic Association | Luther Blacker | 1,162 | 42.70 | |
| Civic Association | William Watkinson | 1,102 | 40.49 | |
| Civic Association | James Sharpe | 991 | 36.42 | −28.10 |
| Independent | Arthur Cometti | 951 | 34.95 | |

=== Other results ===
Harbour Board election

The Combined districts of the Counties of Hutt and Makara, the Boroughs of Petone, Lower Hutt, and Eastbourne, and the Town Districts of Johnsonville and Upper Hutt elected two members to the Wellington Harbour Board.

John William McEwan and Captain Colin Post were elected to the Harbour Board unopposed.
