= Huggan =

Huggan is a surname. Notable people with the surname include:

- Annie Huggan (1890–1983), New Zealand politician
- Isabel Huggan (born 1943), Canadian author of fiction and personal essays
- James Huggan (1888–1914), Scotland rugby union player
- Joe Huggan (1897–1957), New Zealand politician

== See also ==
- Huggen
