= 1917 Petone Borough Council election =

Local election in New Zealand

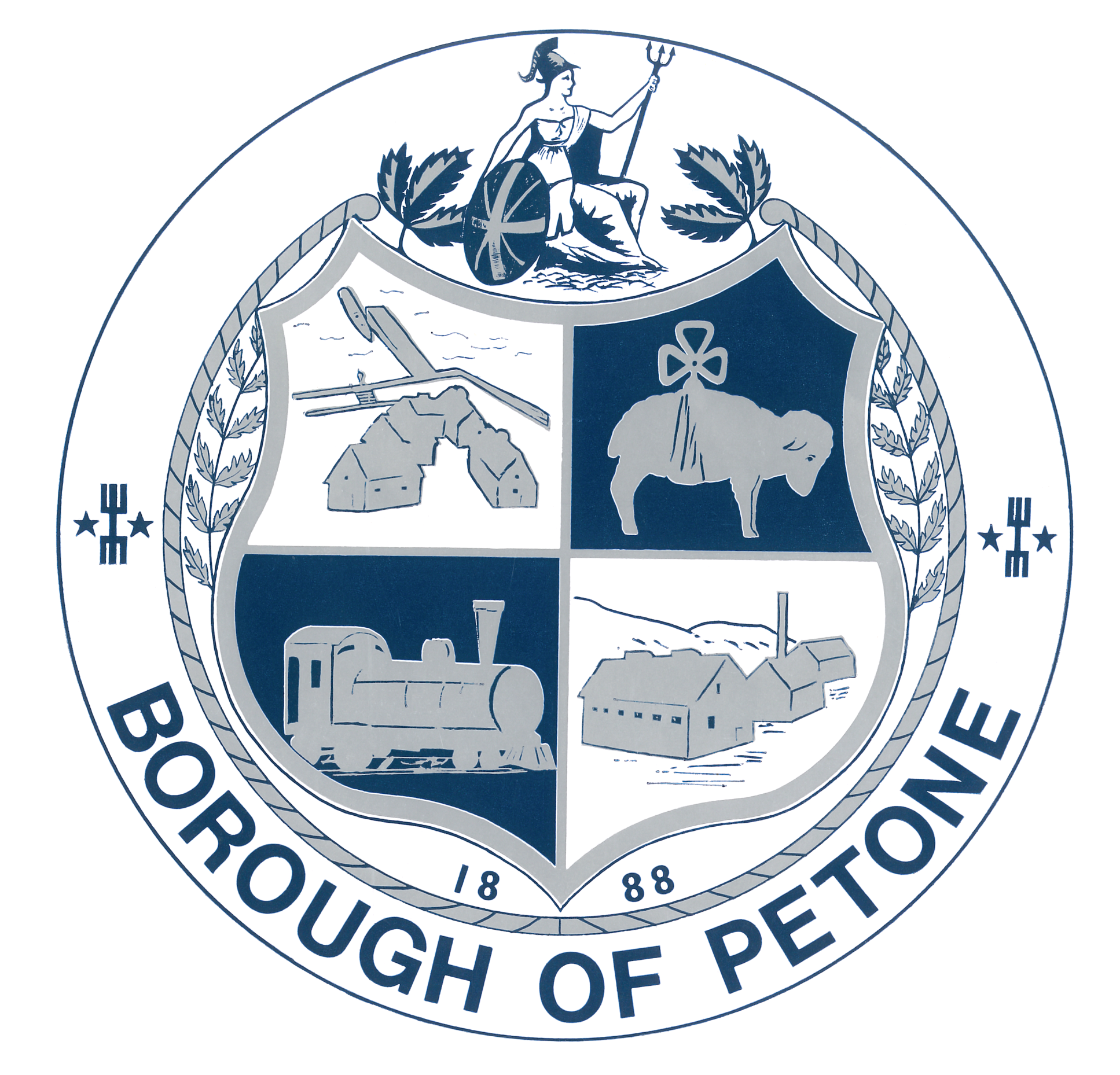
- 25 April 1917
- Turnout: 2,599
- Mayoral election
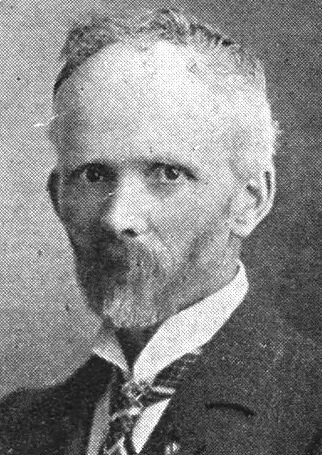

| Candidate | John William McEwan | Alexander Anderson |
| Party | Independent | Labour |
| Popular vote | 1,861 | 717 |
| Percentage | 71.60 | 27.58 |
Mayor before election
John William McEwan
Independent
Elected mayor
John William McEwan
Independent
- Council election
- 9 seats on the Petone Borough Council; 5 seats needed for a majority
| Party | Seats | +/– |
|---|---|---|
| Independents | 6 | −3 |
| Labour | 3 | +3 |
This lists parties that won seats. See the complete results below.

The 1917 Petone Borough Council election was a local election held on 25 April in the Petone, New Zealand, as part of that year's nation-wide local elections. Voters elected the Mayor of Petone and nine borough councillors for a two-year term. Polling booth voting and the first-past-the-post voting system were used.

== Background ==
The incumbent mayor, John William McEwan, stood for a tenth term in office. He was opposed by councillor Alexander Anderson, who stood for the Labour Party. It was the first time the Labour Party ran a ticket of candidates for the borough council.

== Candidates ==
Alexander Anderson

Alexander Anderson had first been elected a councillor in 1913. He was president of the Petone Woollen Workers' Union who were affiliated to the Labour Party and supported his mayoral candidacy.

John William McEwan

John William McEwan had been mayor of Petone since 1907 and a councillor before that from 1901.

== Results ==
=== Mayoral election ===
1917 Petone mayoral election
| Party | Candidate | Votes | % | ±% |
|---|---|---|---|---|
| Independent | John William McEwan | 1,861 | 71.60 | |
| Labour | Alexander Anderson | 717 | 27.58 | |
| Informal votes | | 21 | 0.80 | |
| Majority | | 1,144 | 44.01 | |
| Turnout | | 2,599 | | |

=== Council election ===
1917 Petone Borough Council election
| Party | Candidate | Votes | % | ±% |
|---|---|---|---|---|
| Labour | David McKenzie | 1,864 | 71.71 | |
| Independent | William Cox | 1,489 | 57.29 | |
| Labour | Jeremiah Foster | 1,332 | 51.25 | |
| Independent | Ralph Jones | 1,266 | 48.71 | |
| Independent | James McDougall | 1,247 | 47.97 | |
| Independent | Christopher Brocklebank | 1,238 | 47.63 | |
| Independent | Stephen John Newland | 1,166 | 44.86 | |
| Labour | James Churchhouse | 1,131 | 43.51 | |
| Independent | James Edward Tovey | 1,086 | 41.78 | |
| Independent | James Phillip Gaynor | 1,055 | 40.59 | |
| Labour | William Seddon | 1,023 | 39.36 | |
| Labour | Peter Cairns | 941 | 36.20 | |
| Independent | Richard Alfred Hartley | 791 | 30.43 | |
| Informal votes | | 74 | 2.84 | |
