= 1925 Petone Borough Council election =

Local election in New Zealand

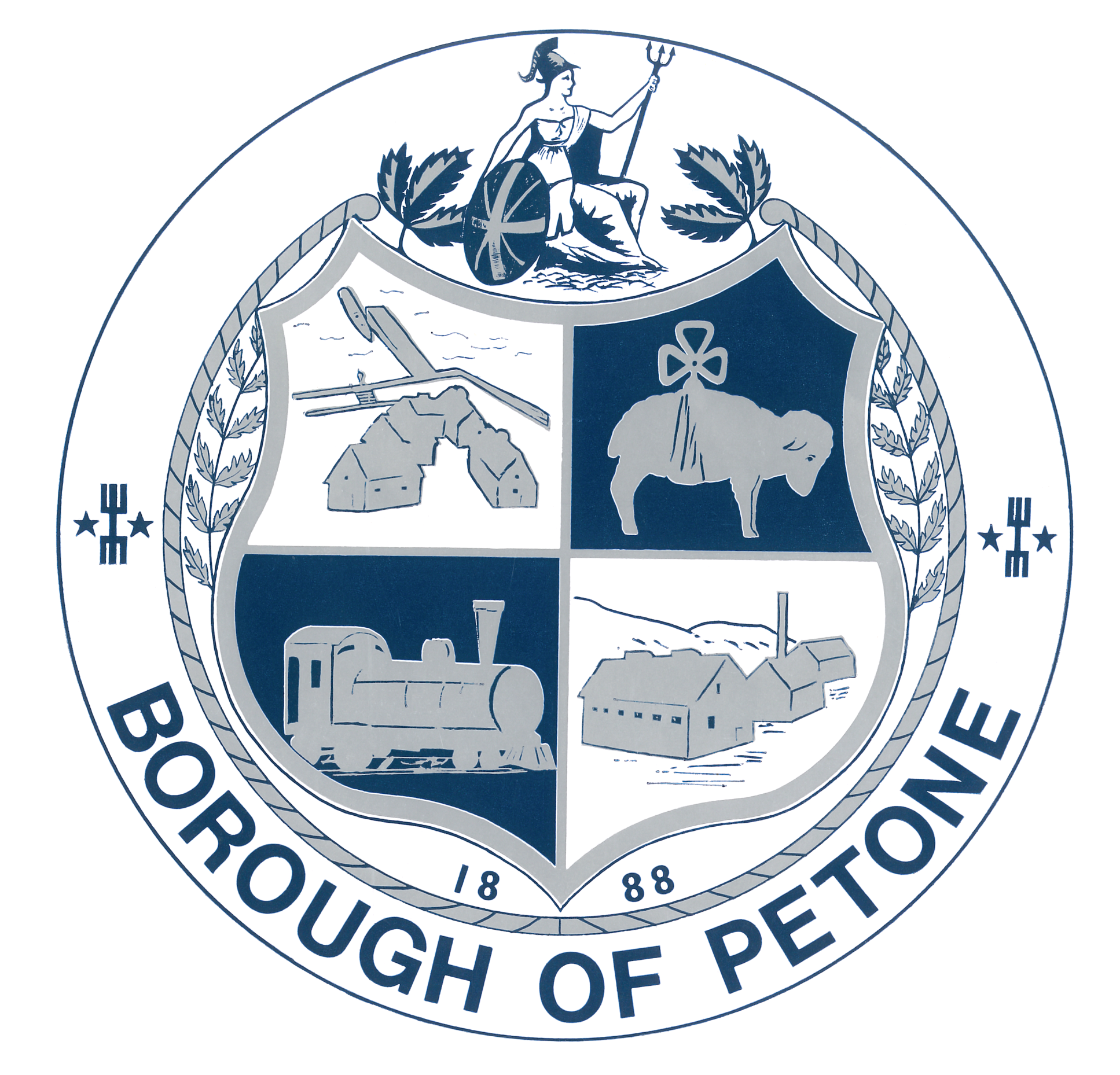
- 29 April 1925
- Turnout: 2,557 (44.05%)
- Mayoral election
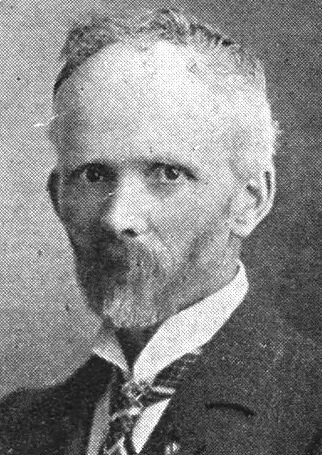

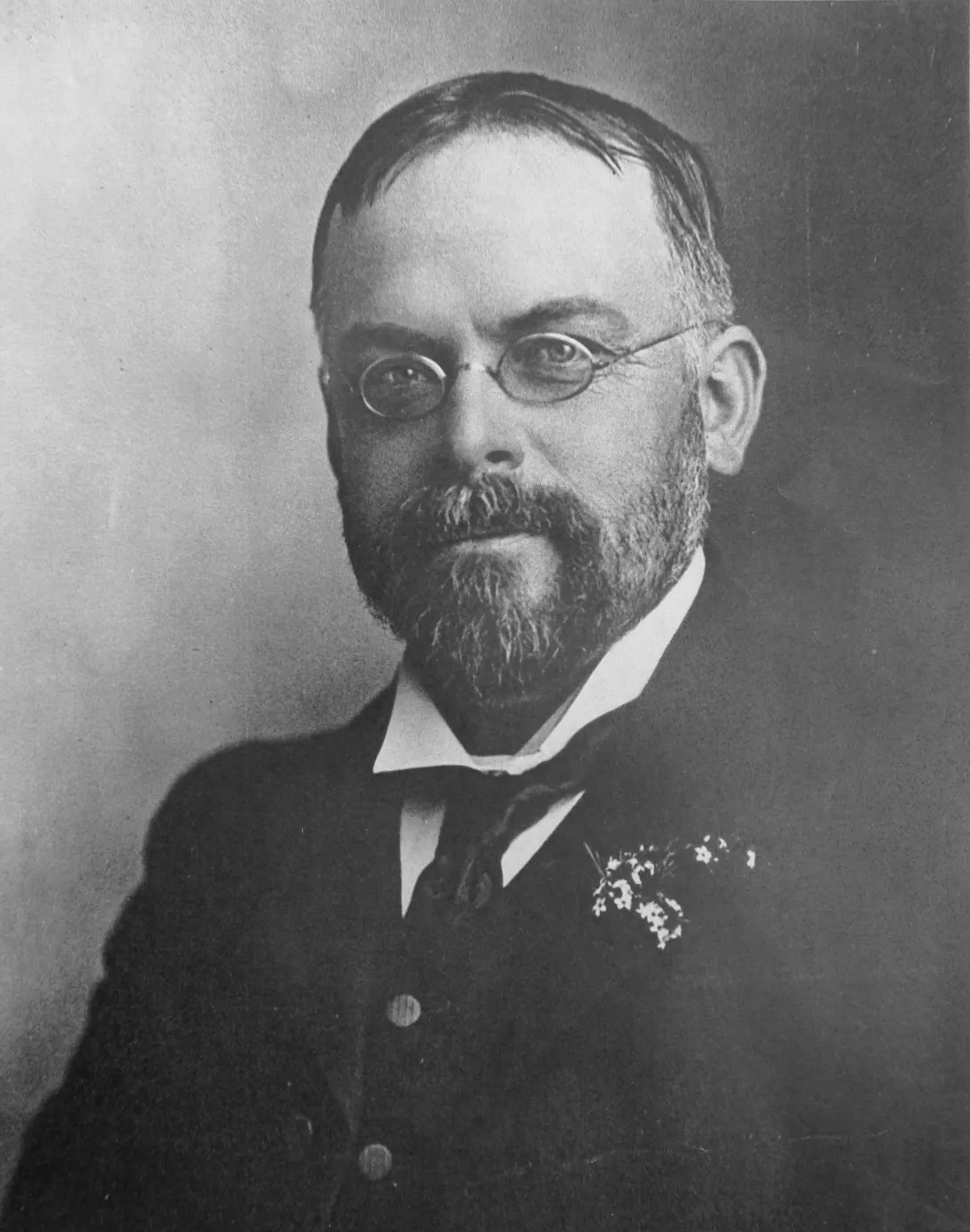
Candidate	John William McEwan	George London
Party	Independent	Independent
Popular vote	1,480	1,077
Percentage	57.88	42.12
Mayor before election
John William McEwan
Independent
Elected mayor
John William McEwan
Independent
- Council election
- 9 seats on the Petone Borough Council; 5 seats needed for a majority
Party	Seats	+/–
Citizens'	5	−3
Labour	4	+4
This lists parties that won seats. See the complete results below.

The 1925 Petone Borough Council election was a local election held on 29 April in the Petone, New Zealand, as part of that year's nation-wide local elections. Voters elected the Mayor of Petone and nine borough councillors for a two-year term. Polling booth voting and the first-past-the-post voting system were used.

== Background ==
The incumbent mayor, John William McEwan, stood for a fourteenth term in office. He was opposed by former mayor George Thomas London.

== Candidates ==
George Thomas London

George London had previously been Mayor of Petone from 1903 to 1907. He had also contested the parliamentary seat of Hutt twice, in 1890 and 1905. He had previously opposed McEwan in 1919.

John William McEwan

John William McEwan had been mayor of Petone since 1907 and a councillor before that from 1901.

== Results ==
=== Mayoral election ===
1925 Petone mayoral election
Party	Candidate	Votes	%	±%
Independent	John William McEwan	1,480	57.88	−7.35
Independent	George Thomas London	1,077	42.12	
Majority		403	15.76	−16.19
Turnout		2,557	44.05	

=== Council election ===
1925 Petone Borough Council election
Party	Candidate	Votes	%	±%
Citizens'	James Sharpe	1,650	64.52	
Citizens'	Victor Jacobsen	1,531	59.87	−0.73
Citizens'	George Cook	1,378	53.89	−0.28
Labour	Albert Scholefield	1,174	45.91	+3.82
Labour	Thomas Gallagher	1,145	44.77	
Labour	Edward Norman Campbell	1,010	39.49	
Citizens'	Christopher Brocklebank	993	38.83	−8.16
Labour	William Edwards	992	38.79	+0.21
Citizens'	Henry Jay	991	38.75	−3.80
Independent	John Kyle	989	38.67	
Citizens'	Ralph Jones	983	38.44	−10.74
Independent	Josiah Packard	935	36.56	
Independent	John Albert Clark	916	35.82	
Labour	Denis McCarthy	835	32.65	
Independent	Albert John Daniell	774	30.26	
Independent	George Cairns	718	28.07	
Independent	Walter Bird	667	26.08	
Independent	Luke Russell	200	7.82	

=== Other results ===
Harbour Board election

The Combined districts of the Counties of Hutt and Makara, the Boroughs of Petone, Lower Hutt, and Eastbourne, and the Town Districts of Johnsonville and Upper Hutt elected two members to the Wellington Harbour Board.

1925 Wellington Harbour Board election, Combined Districts
Party	Candidate	Votes	%	±%
Citizens'	John William McEwan	4,413	95.00	+1.12
Citizens'	Colin Post	2,634	56.70	
Independent	Angus McCurdy	2,242	48.26	
Majority		392	8.43	
Turnout		4,645		
