= Tupare =

Tupare can refer to:

- Olearia colensoi, a New Zealand-endemic shrub
- Tupare (homestead), a mansion and associated gardens in New Plymouth, New Zealand
