= 1921 Petone Borough Council election =

Election in New Zealand

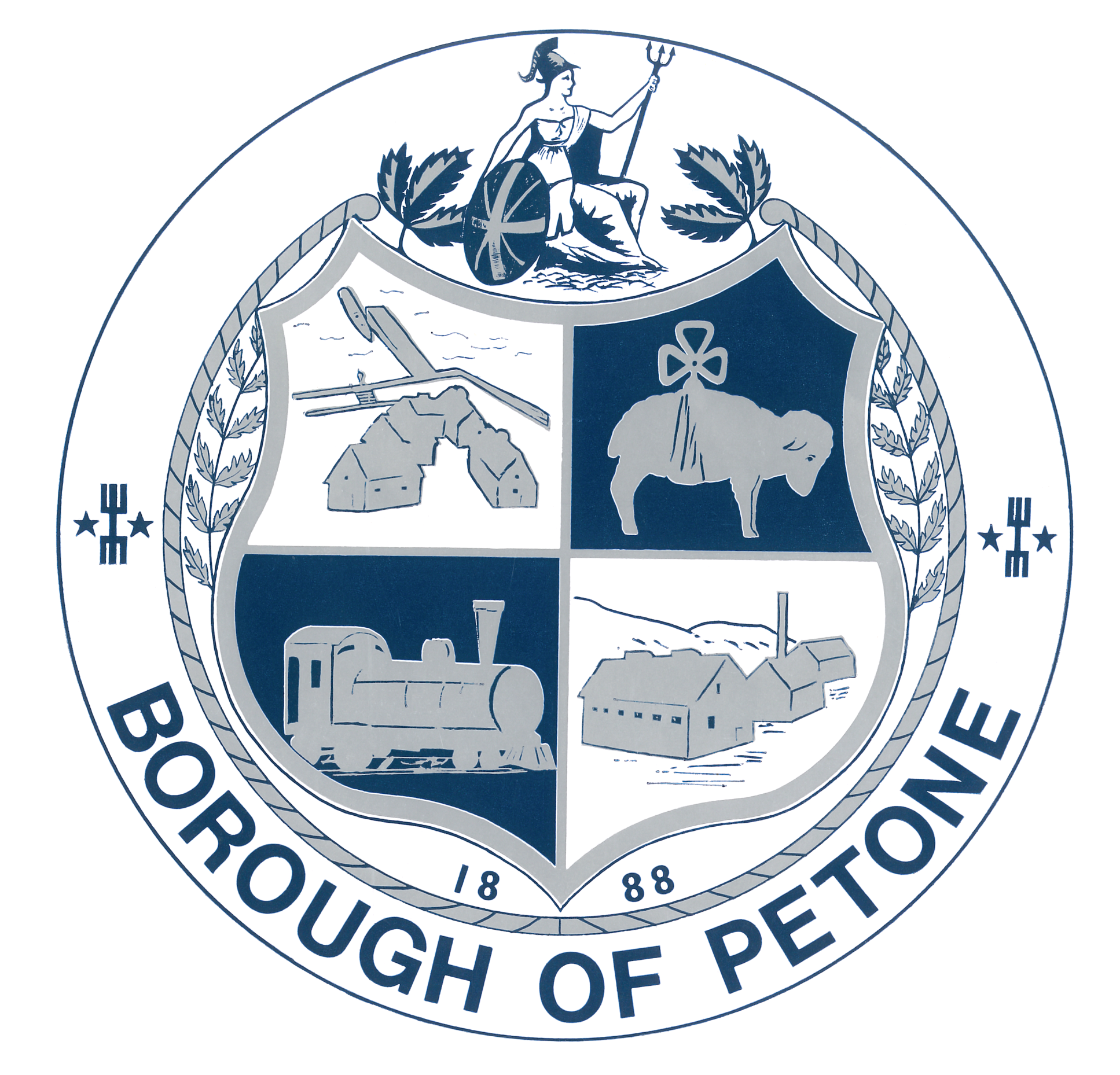
- 2,226
- Turnout: 27 April 1921
- Mayoral election
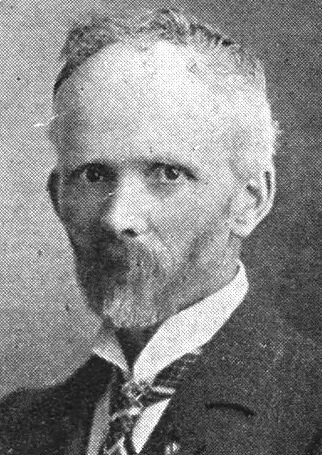

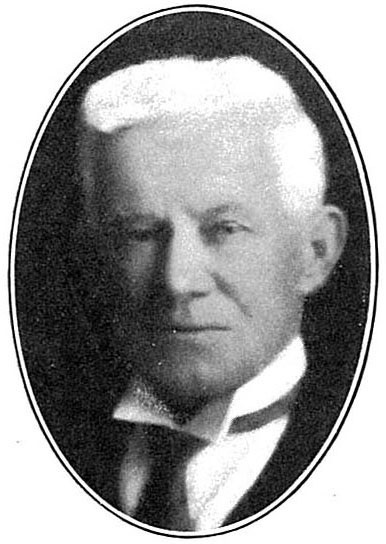
Candidate	John William McEwan	David McKenzie	Albert Pere
Party	Independent	Labour	Independent
Popular vote	1,021	640	565
Percentage	45.86	28.75	25.38
Mayor before election
John William McEwan
Independent
Elected mayor
John William McEwan
Independent
- Council election
- 9 seats on the Petone Borough Council; 5 seats needed for a majority
Party	Seats	+/–
Independents	8	+1
Labour	1	−1
This lists parties that won seats. See the complete results below.

The 1921 Petone Borough Council election was a local election held on 27 April in the Petone, New Zealand, as part of that year's nation-wide local elections. Voters elected the mayor of Petone and nine borough councillors for a two-year term. Polling booth voting and the first-past-the-post voting system were used.

== Background ==
The incumbent mayor, John William McEwan, stood for a twelfth term in office. He was opposed by two other candidates, former councillor David McKenzie and lawyer Albert Pere.

== Candidates ==
John William McEwan

John William McEwan had been mayor of Petone since 1907 and a councillor before that from 1901.

David McKenzie

David McKenzie was a Scottish-born trade unionist and former employee of the Petone Woollen Works who had led a strike for better working conditions in 1916. He had previously been a borough councillor from 1915 to 1918.

Albert Pere

Albert Pere was a lawyer and son of Wi Pere, a former Member of Parliament for Eastern Maori.

== Results ==
=== Mayoral election ===
1921 Petone mayoral election
Party	Candidate	Votes	%	±%
Independent	John William McEwan	1,021	45.86	−6.72
Labour	David McKenzie	640	28.75	
Independent	Albert Pere	565	25.38	
Majority		381	17.11	
Turnout		2,226		

=== Council election ===
1921 Petone Borough Council election
Party	Candidate	Votes	%	±%
Independent	Douglas Bedingfield	1,481	66.53	+5.23
Labour	James Churchouse	1,144	51.39	+1.74
Independent	William Hay	1,111	49.91	+11.81
Independent	Christopher Brocklebank	1,099	49.37	+8.93
Independent	George Cook	1,097	49.28	
Independent	Melville Ford	1,030	46.27	
Independent	Ralph Jones	1,029	46.22	+8.94
Independent	Alexander Anderson	984	44.20	+4.49
Independent	Richard Alfred Hartley	937	42.09	
Independent	Ernest Ackroyd	920	41.32	
Independent	James Edward Tovey	902	40.52	−0.56
Independent	John Kyle	882	39.62	−5.79
Labour	Albert Scholefield	656	29.46	+1.00
Labour	William Herbert Edwards	574	25.78	
Independent	William McCullough	541	24.30	
Labour	Albert Spurr	521	23.40	−1.16
Labour	Ernest Howard Garrett	346	15.54	

=== Harbour Board election ===
The Combined districts of the Counties of Hutt and Makara, the Boroughs of Petone, Lower Hutt, and Eastbourne, and the Town Districts of Johnsonville and Upper Hutt elected two members to the Wellington Harbour Board.

1921 Wellington Harbour Board election, Combined Districts
Party	Candidate	Votes	%	±%
Independent	John William McEwan	2,780	92.38	
Independent	Maurice Welch	1,871	62.18	
Independent	Walter Thomas Cotton	1,366	45.39	
Majority		505	16.78	
Turnout		3,009		
