= 1919 Petone Borough Council election =

Local election in New Zealand

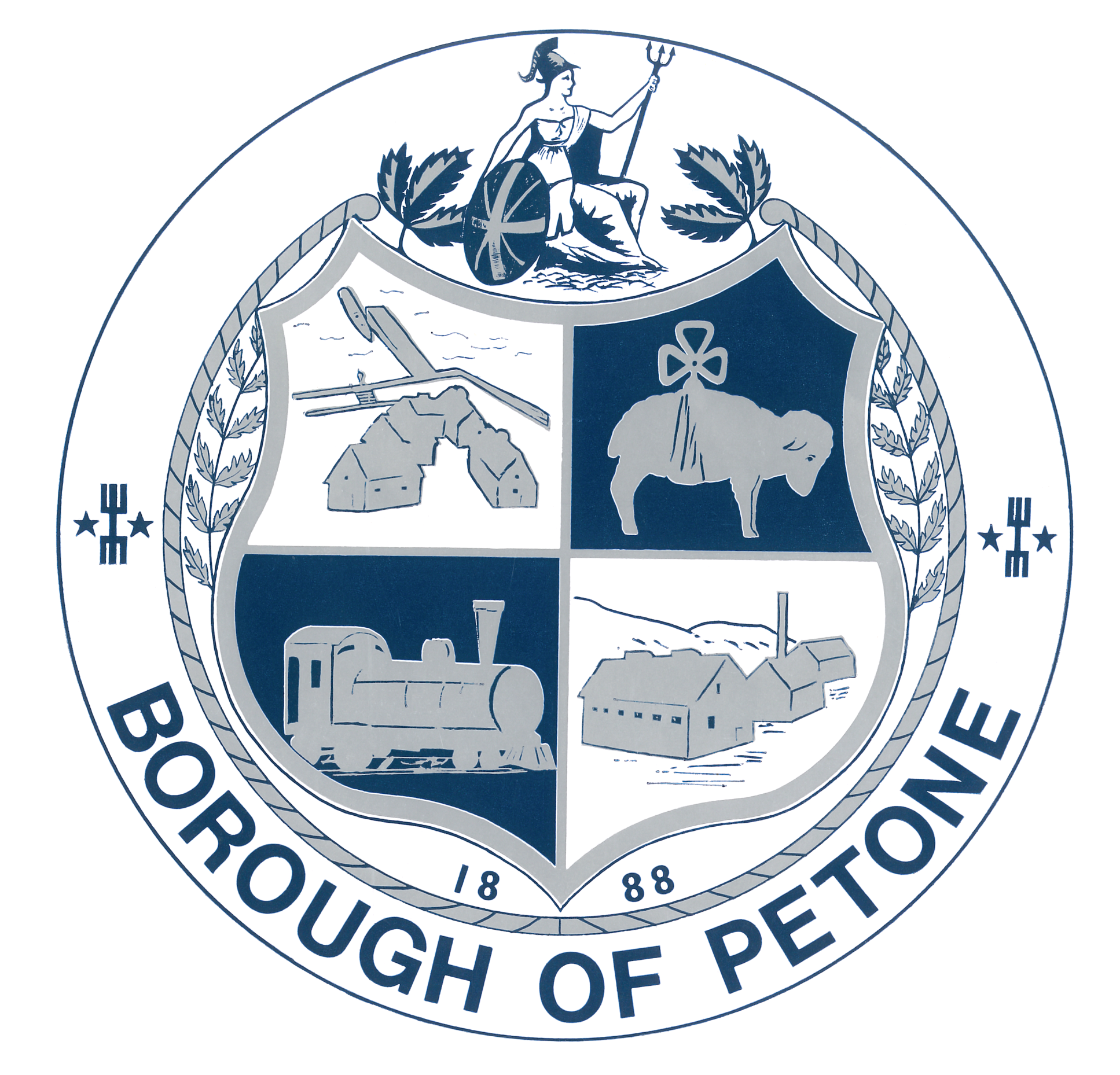
- 30 April 1919
- Turnout: 2,052
- Mayoral election
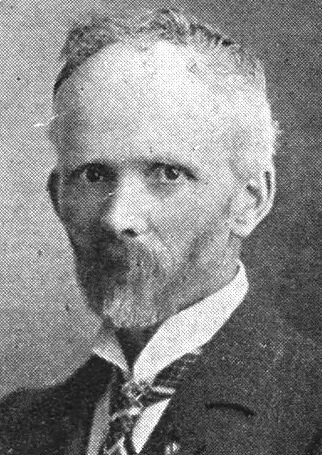

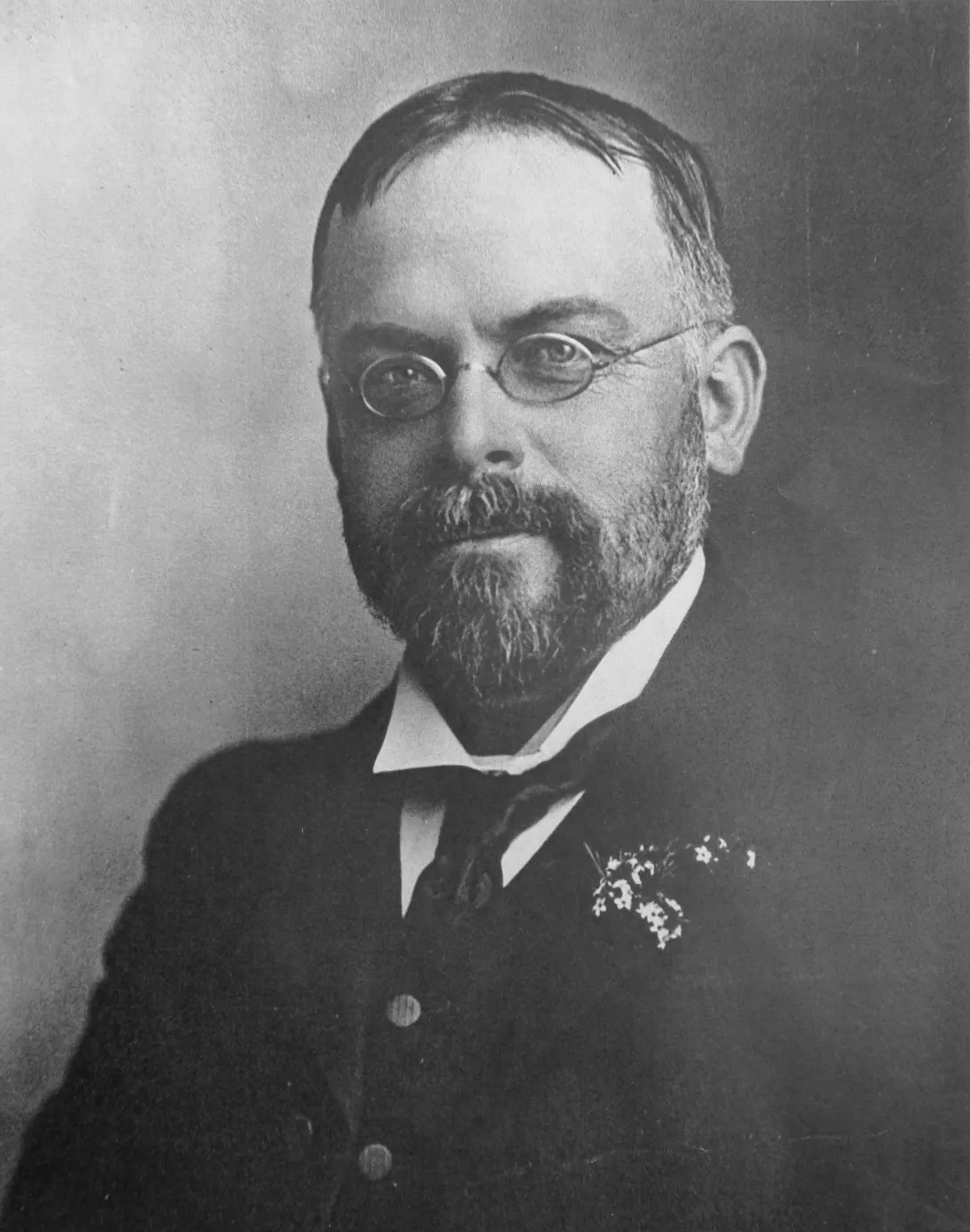
Candidate	John William McEwan	George London
Party	Independent	Independent
Popular vote	1,079	951
Percentage	52.58	46.34
Mayor before election
John William McEwan
Independent
Elected mayor
John William McEwan
Independent
- Council election
- 9 seats on the Petone Borough Council; 5 seats needed for a majority
Party	Seats	+/–
Independents	7	+1
Labour	2	−1
This lists parties that won seats. See the complete results below.

The 1919 Petone Borough Council election was a local election held on 30 April in the Petone, New Zealand, as part of that year's nation-wide local elections. Voters elected the Mayor of Petone and nine borough councillors for a two-year term. Polling booth voting and the first-past-the-post voting system were used.

== Background ==
The incumbent mayor, John William McEwan, stood for an eleventh term in office. He was opposed by former mayor George Thomas London.

== Candidates ==
George Thomas London

George London had previously been Mayor of Petone from 1903 to 1907. He had also contested the parliamentary seat of Hutt twice, in 1890 and 1905.

John William McEwan

John William McEwan had been mayor of Petone since 1907 and a councillor before that from 1901.

== Results ==
=== Mayoral election ===
1919 Petone mayoral election
Party	Candidate	Votes	%	±%
Independent	John William McEwan	1,079	52.58	−19.02
Independent	George Thomas London	951	46.34	
Informal votes		22	1.07	+0.27
Majority		128	6.23	−37.78
Turnout		2,052		

=== Council election ===
1919 Petone Borough Council election
Party	Candidate	Votes	%	±%
Independent	Douglas Bedingfield	1,258	61.30	
Labour	James Churchouse	1,019	49.65	+6.14
Independent	George Cook	935	45.56	
Independent	John Kyle	932	45.41	
Independent	William Cox	897	43.71	−13.58
Independent	James Edward Tovey	843	41.08	−0.70
Independent	Christopher Brocklebank	830	40.44	−7.19
Labour	Alexander Anderson	815	39.71	
Independent	William Hay	782	38.10	
Independent	Ralph Jones	765	37.28	−11.43
Labour	William Seddon	747	36.40	−2.96
Independent	Thomas Ashby	735	35.81	
Independent	Stephen John Newland	708	34.50	−10.36
Independent	Walter Harry Long	643	31.33	
Labour	Albert Scholefield	584	28.46	
Labour	Albert Spurr	504	24.56	
Independent	George Lambert	444	21.63	
Informal votes		108	5.26	+2.42
