= 1971 New Year Honours (New Zealand) =

Annual awards for New Zealanders

The 1971 New Year Honours in New Zealand were appointments by Elizabeth II on the advice of the New Zealand government to various orders and honours to reward and highlight good works by New Zealanders. The awards celebrated the passing of 1970 and the beginning of 1971, and were announced on 1 January 1971.

The recipients of honours are displayed here as they were styled before their new honour.

== Knight Bachelor ==
- Noel Cole – of Auckland. For outstanding services to the community.

== Order of the Bath ==
=== Companion (CB) ===
Military division

- Rear Admiral Lawrence George Carr DSC – Royal New Zealand Navy.

== Order of Saint Michael and Saint George ==
=== Companion (CMG) ===
- Kendrick Gee Archer – of Christchurch. For most valuable services as a judge of the Valuation Court and chairman of various administrative tribunals.
- Ivan Thomas – of Wellington. For most valuable services as general manager of the New Zealand Railways.

== Order of the British Empire ==
=== Knight Commander (KBE) ===
Civil division

- Brian Gerald Barratt-Boyes CBE MB ChM. For outstanding services as surgeon-in-charge of the cardio-thoracic unit at Green Lane Hospital, Auckland.
- George Philip Proctor CBE – of Wellington. For outstanding services to manufacturing and the community.

=== Commander (CBE) ===
Civil division

- Professor Ian Alistair Gordon – of Wellington. For very valuable services to university education.
- James Robert Maddren – of Christchurch. For very valuable services to industry and the export drive.
- Professor John Arthur Reginald Miles MD – of Dunedin. For very valuable services to science.
- Alick Lindsay Poole – of Wellington. For very valuable services to the development of forestry and the forest industries.

Military division

- Brigadier Ian Thomas Galloway OBE ED – Royal New Zealand Armoured Corps (Territorial Force).

=== Officer (OBE) ===
Civil division

- Marjory French Erne Adams – of Auckland. For valuable services to education as headmistress of Epsom Girls Grammar School from 1953 to 1970.
- The Right Reverend Owen Thomas Baragwanath ED – of Auckland. For valuable services to the community as a minister of religion.
- Robert Colville Bradshaw – of Upper Hutt. For valuable services to industry and commerce.
- The Reverend Haddon Charles Dixon – of Lower Hutt. For valuable services to the relief of hunger and poverty overseas.
- John Lloyd Fenaughty – of Wellington. For valuable services as New Zealand commissioner-general at Expo 70, Osaka.
- Claude Jack Ferrier – of Christchurch. For valuable services to the community.
- Marie Louise Dansey Iles MBE – of Christchurch. For valuable services as general secretary of the Girl Guides Association.
- Gilbert Maclean MB ChB. For valuable services to the community as chairman of the Wellington Hospital Board.
- Russell Matthews – of New Plymouth. For valuable services to the community.
- John Alexander Moreland – of Cambridge. For valuable services to the dairy industry.
- Iriaka Rio Te Hihiri Rātana – of Whangaehu. For valuable services to the Māori people.
- Constance Egmont Tulloch MBE – of Putāruru. For valuable services to the community, especially as chairman of the Waikato Hospital Board.
- Edward William Desmond Unwin MBE ED. For valuable services as chairman of the Timaru Harbour Board.

Military division

- Commander Raymond Frederick Sanderson VRD – Royal New Zealand Naval Volunteer Reserve.
- Lieutenant-Colonel Arthur Wynyard Beasley – Royal New Zealand Army Medical Corps (Territorial Force).
- Group Captain Nelson Hastings Bright – Royal New Zealand Air Force.
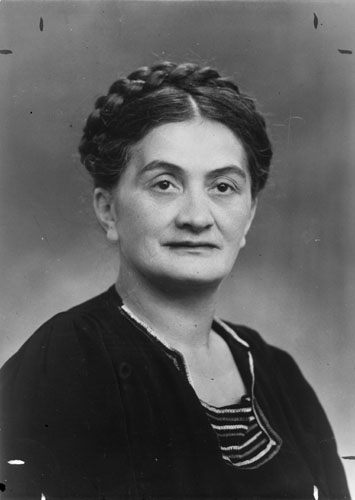
Iriaka Rātana

=== Member (MBE) ===
Civil division

- Lloyd James Appleton – of Dannevirke. For services to local government and journalism.
- Thomas Frank Armstrong Archer – of Nelson. For services as president of the New Zealand Fruit Growers Federation Ltd, 1950–1966.
- Neil Alexander Barr – of Kaukapakapa. For services as founder of the Farm Forestry Association in New Zealand.
- Frederick Harold Bennett. For services to local government as chairman of the Masterton County Council.
- Percival Mahan Brooker – of Wellington. For services to brass band music.
- Stanley Crawford Childs – of Pukekohe. For services to local government.
- Mollie Christie, MB ChB – of Wanganui. For services to the community.
- Wilfred Trevor Church – of Hamilton. For services to the community.
- Alan Harry De Costa – of Gisborne. For services to surf lifesaving.
- Frank McGregor Henderson – of Lumsden. For services to agriculture and education.
- Lily Annie Huggan For services to the community especially as mayor of Petone.
- Eileen Marie Kelly – of Greymouth. For services to the community.
- Father Thomas Gerarde Keyes – of Invercargill. For services to the rehabilitation of young offenders.
- Harold Edward Lawrence – of Ōtorohanga. For services to local government.
- Charles Frederic Le Cren – of Christchurch. For services to amputees.
- Jessie Kennedy Lees – of New Plymouth, For services to the Women's Division of Federated Farmers.
- Caroline Elizabeth Lepper – of Invercargill. For services to crippled children.
- Lewis Rowland Lewis – of Napier. For services to education.
- George Lorimer McLatchie – of Oamaru. For services to the poultry industry.
- Colin Earl Meads – of Te Kūiti. For services to rugby football.
- Walter Allan Parker. For services as mayor of Kaitangata.
- Henry Witen Bell Poppelwell – of Hastings. For services to the community.
- Gordon Cowie Riddell – of Auckland. For services to the community.
- Brian Preston Stevenson – of Auckland. For services to local government.

Military division

- Lieutenant Commander (Special) Ian George McLean – Royal New Zealand Naval Volunteer Reserve.
- Lieutenant Commander John Joseph Maire – Royal New Zealand Navy.
- Warrant Officer Second Class David Ernie Dorset – Corps of Royal New Zealand Engineers (Regular Force).
- Warrant Officer First Class Roland Alfred Manning – Royal New Zealand Infantry Regiment (Regular Force).
- Warrant Officer First Class George Hedley Newcomb – Royal New Zealand Infantry Regiment (Territorial Force).
- Warrant Officer William Twaddle Frickleton Buchanan MM – Royal New Zealand Air Force.
- Flight Lieutenant Walter George Carruthers – Royal New Zealand Air Force.
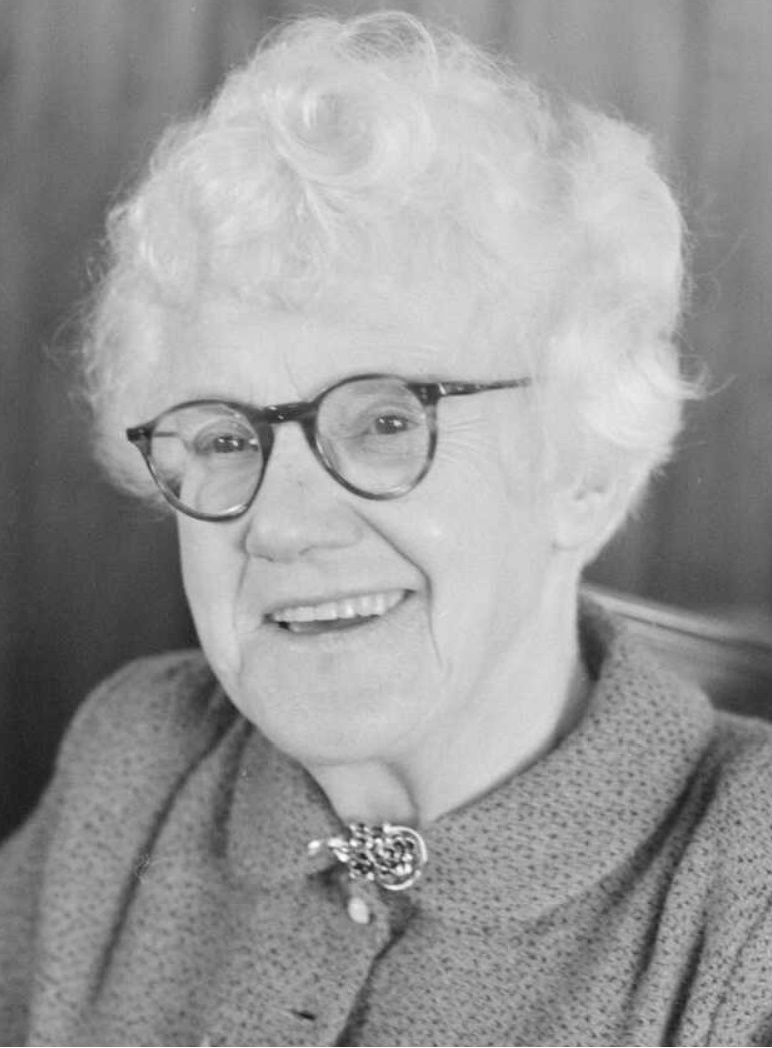
Annie Huggan

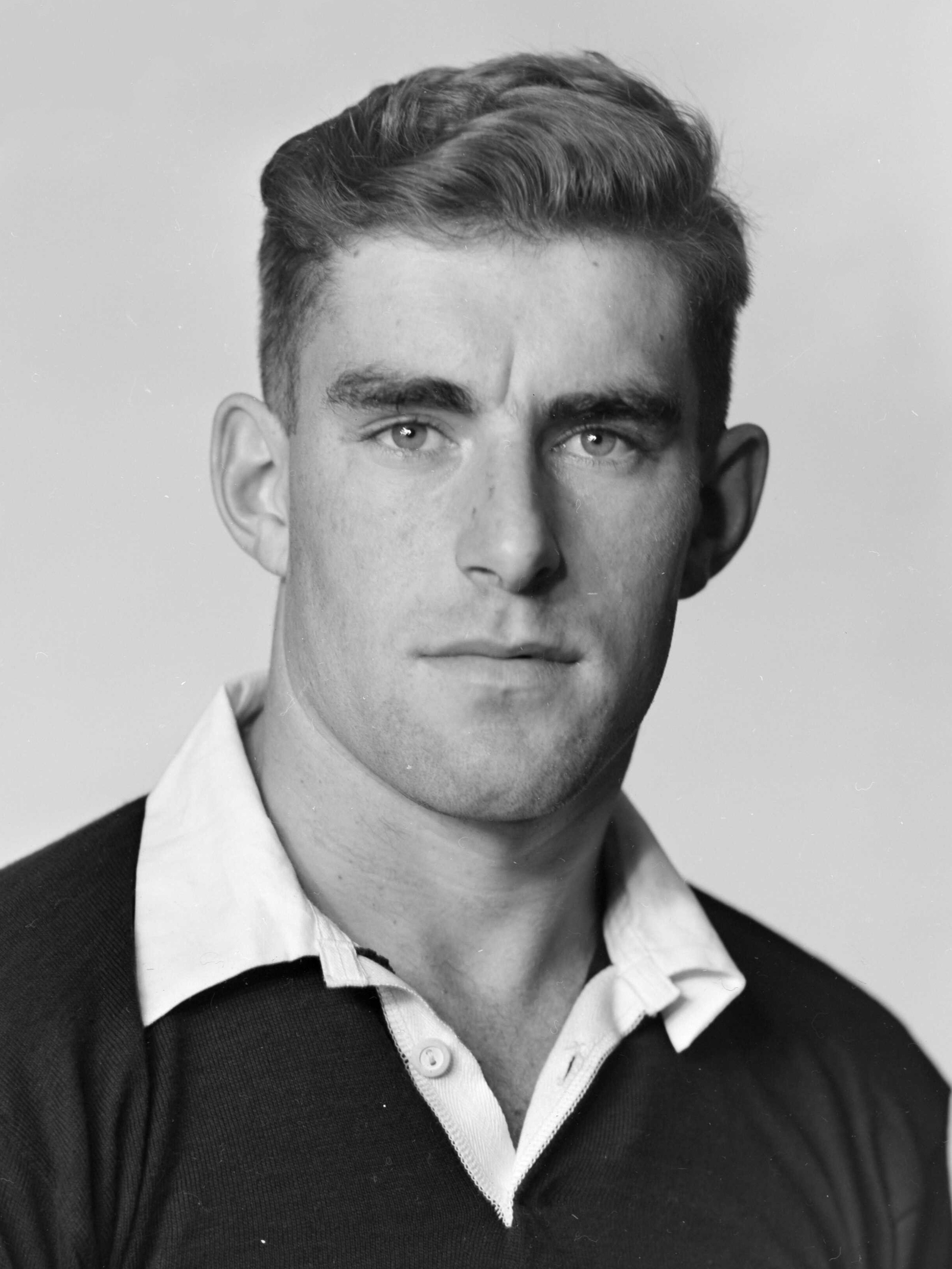
Colin Meads

== Companion of the Imperial Service Order (ISO) ==
- Ian Greville Watt – of Auckland. For valuable services as director of the Meat Division, Department of Agriculture.

== British Empire Medal (BEM) ==
Civil division

- Ernest Ashton – of Nelson. For services to the community especially as a member of the St John Ambulance Association.
- Sheila Currie – of Christchurch. For services to disabled and handicapped children.
- Daphne Matilda Dobell – of Kaitaia. For services to the community.
- Leigh Sherns Gooch – of Takapau. For services to the scouting movement.
- Zella Eugenie Harrison – of Hokitika. For services to the community.
- George Charles Hart – of Auckland. For services to the community.
- Joseph Frederick Jobson – of Linden. For services as a member of the Post Office.
- Eileen Elizabeth Lane – of Christchurch. For services to netball.
- Marjorie Isabel Pilkington – of Ōpōtiki. For services to the community.
- Agnes Reid – of Auckland. For services to intellectually handicapped children.
- Constable Raymond John Ruane – of Katikati. For services to the community.
- John Smith – of Rotorua. For services as a tour coach driver.
- Winifrede Mary Smith – of Ranfurly. For services to the community.

Military division

- Chief Marine Engineering Artificer Kelvin William Hunt – Royal New Zealand Navy.
- Petty Officer Leigh George Morley – Royal New Zealand Navy.
- Staff-Sergeant Wallace Richards – Royal New Zealand Infantry Regiment (Territorial Force).
- Staff-Seargeant (Temporary Warrant Officer Second Class) Daniel Wilfred Wilson – New Zealand Special Air Service (Regular Force).
- Flight Sergeant Wallace Frederick Cleaver – Royal New Zealand Air Force.
- Flight Sergeant Joseph John Keegan – Royal New Zealand Air Force.
- Temporary Sergeant Ronald Allan Nicholson – Royal New Zealand Air Force.

== Air Force Cross (AFC) ==
- Lieutenant Commander Nigel Hawkesly Burbury – Royal Navy.
- Squadron Leader Donald Raymond Smith – Royal New Zealand Air Force.

== Queen's Police Medal (QPM) ==
- George Stuart Austing – assistant commissioner, New Zealand Police Force.

== Queen's Fire Services Medal (QFSM) ==
- Frank Albert Hardy – chief fire officer, Christchurch Fire Brigade.
- Peter Habib – fireman, Haumoana.

== Queen's Commendation for Valuable Service in the Air ==
- Flight Lieutenant John Stewart Hosie – Royal New Zealand Air Force.
