= John Campbell Burns =

New Zealand cricketer

Personal information
- Born: 28 January 1880; Lawrence, New Zealand
- Died: 11 June 1941 (aged 61); Petone, New Zealand
- Role: Wicket-keeper

Domestic team information
- Years: Team
- 1914/15: Wellington
- Source: CricketArchive, 23 October 2020

John Campbell Burns (28 January 1880 – 11 June 1941) was a New Zealand teacher, sportsman and politician.

== Biography ==
Burns was born in 1880 at Lawrence. His family moved to the Hutt Valley when his father got a job at the Hutt and Petone Chronicle newspaper.

Burns played representative rugby union as an inside back for Wellington in the late-1800s. He was also a representative player in cricket, as wicketkeeper. He played in two first-class matches for Wellington in 1914/15.

Burns graduated with a Master of Arts degree with honours at Victoria University College. In August 1896 he began a career with the Wellington Education Board in 1896 as well as being a junior teacher in Petone. Later he was assistant headmaster for two years at the Terrace School, Wellington. He then taught at Reikorangi, Levin, Mount Cook, Newtown, Karori, and Petone West schools. In November 1921 he was appointed headmaster of Petone West School, remaining in that position until his death. He was an executive member and treasurer of the New Zealand Educational Institute and was a foundation executive member of the Victoria University Students' Association.

In 1929 Burns was elected to the Petone Borough Council. He was a councillor until 1935 when he stood only for the mayoralty, but was defeated. Burns finished third out of four candidates behind incumbent mayor Albert Scholefield and former mayor John William McEwan. He returned to the council soon after, winning a 1936 by-election. He was selected to be deputy mayor, and he took the place of mayor George London, who was on active service in World War II, from May 1940 to May 1941. In early 1941 he decided not to contest the next election owing to ill health. However, at the last moment, he was persuaded to reconsider and stood as an independent candidate, but was defeated.

Burns died on 11 June 1941 in Petone, aged 61. He was survived by his wife, son and three daughters.

Political offices
Preceded by Eric Thomas Edward Hogg	Deputy Mayor of Petone; 1938-1941	Succeeded by Alec MacFarlane
