= 1923 Petone Borough Council election =

Election in New Zealand

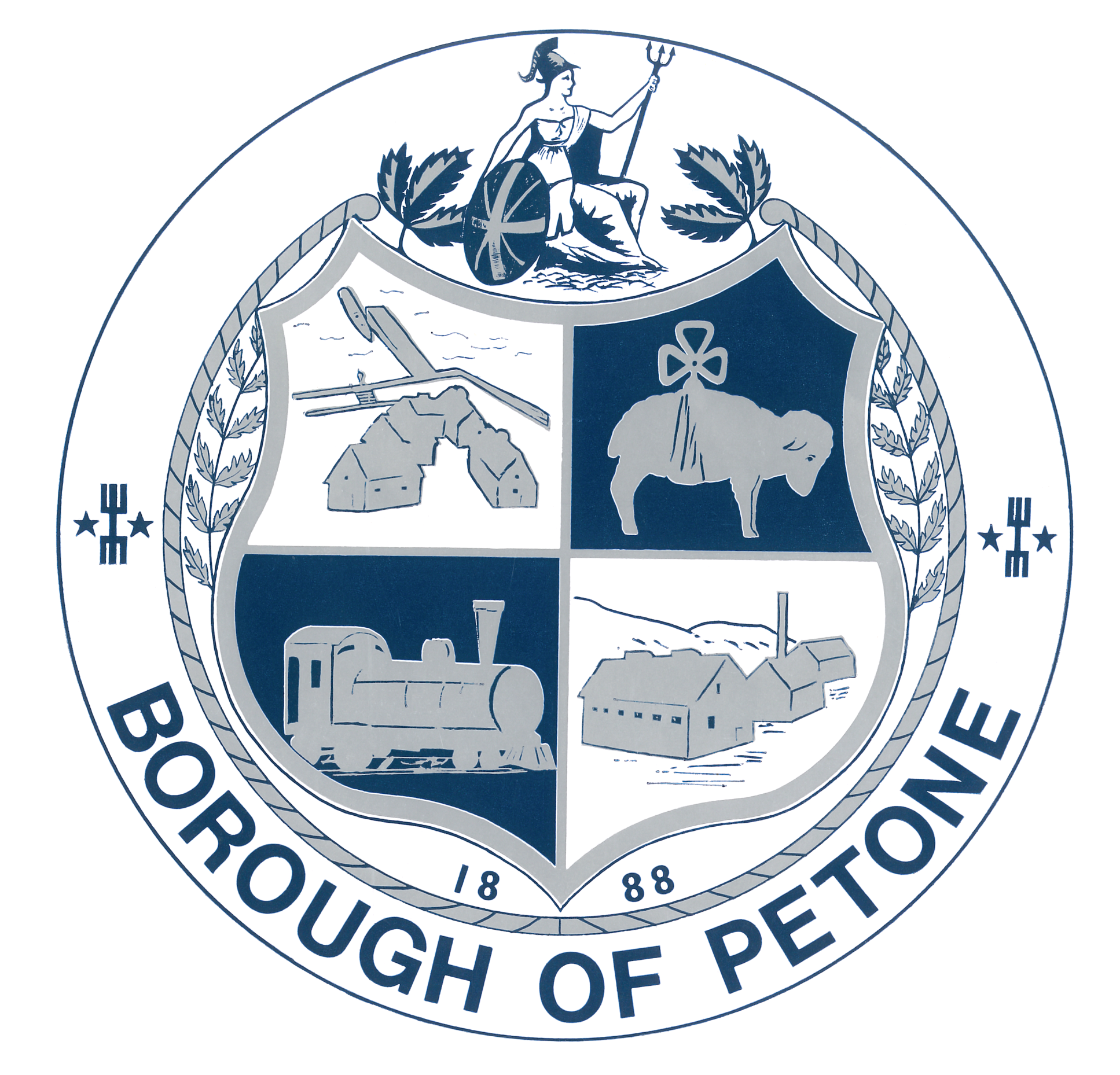
- 1,962
- Turnout: 26 April 1923
- Mayoral election
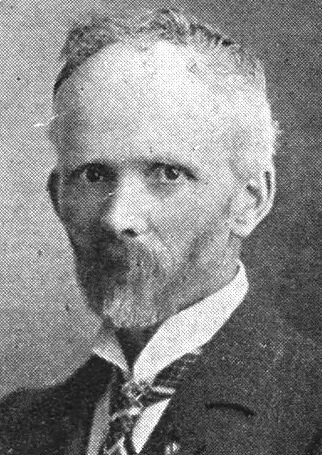

Candidate	John William McEwan	Albert Pere
Party	Independent	Independent
Popular vote	1,280	653
Percentage	65.23	33.28
Mayor before election
John William McEwan
Independent
Elected mayor
John William McEwan
Independent
- Council election
- 9 seats on the Petone Borough Council; 5 seats needed for a majority
Party	Seats	+/–
Citizens'	8	+8
Independents	1	−7
Labour	0	−1
This lists parties that won seats. See the complete results below.

The 1923 Petone Borough Council election was a local election held on 26 April in the Petone Borough, New Zealand, as part of that year's nation-wide local elections. Voters elected the mayor of Petone and nine borough councillors for a two-year term. Polling booth voting and the first-past-the-post voting system were used.

== Background ==
The incumbent mayor, John William McEwan, stood for a thirteenth term in office. He was opposed by councillor Albert Pere.

== Candidates ==
John William McEwan

John William McEwan had been mayor of Petone since 1907 and a councillor before that from 1901. The Citizens' electoral ticket endorsed him on their ticket for the Wellington Harbour Board, but not for the mayoralty.

Albert Pere

Albert Pere was a lawyer and son of Wi Pere, a former Member of Parliament for Eastern Maori. In February 1922 he had been elected to the council in a by-election to replace James Churchouse who had resigned. He had previously opposed McEwan at the 1921 election.

== Results ==
=== Mayoral election ===
1923 Petone mayoral election
Party	Candidate	Votes	%	±%
Independent	John William McEwan	1,280	65.23	+19.37
Independent	Albert Pere	653	33.28	+7.90
Informal votes		29	1.47	
Majority		627	31.95	+14.84
Turnout		1,962		

=== Council election ===
1923 Petone Borough Council election
Party	Candidate	Votes	%	±%
Citizens'	Victor Jacobsen	1,189	60.60	
Citizens'	George Cook	1,063	54.17	+4.89
Citizens'	William Hay	1,058	53.92	+4.01
Independent	William Patrick Coles	991	50.50	
Citizens'	Albert Janes Pointon	986	50.25	
Citizens'	Ralph Jones	965	49.18	+2.96
Citizens'	Christopher Brocklebank	922	46.99	−2.38
Citizens'	Albert George Steffensen	922	46.99	
Citizens'	Henry Jay	835	42.55	
Labour	Albert Scholefield	826	42.09	+12.63
Labour	Arthur Longbottom	759	38.68	
Labour	William Herbert Edwards	757	38.58	+12.80
Citizens'	Philip Truscott	746	38.02	
Labour	Edward Warner	674	34.35	
Independent	Edward Holmes	547	27.87	
Informal votes		49	2.49	

=== Harbour Board election ===
The Combined districts of the Counties of Hutt and Makara, the Boroughs of Petone, Lower Hutt, and Eastbourne, and the Town Districts of Johnsonville and Upper Hutt elected two members to the Wellington Harbour Board.

1923 Wellington Harbour Board election, Combined Districts
Party	Candidate	Votes	%	±%
Citizens'	John William McEwan	3,471	93.88	+1.50
Citizens'	Maurice Welch	2,122	57.39	−4.79
Independent	Walter Thomas Cotton	1,739	47.03	+1.64
Informal votes		61	1.64	
Majority		383	10.35	−6.43
Turnout		3,697		
