= Ngātata Love =

New Zealand academic and Māori leader

Sir Ngātata Love GNZM QSO JP
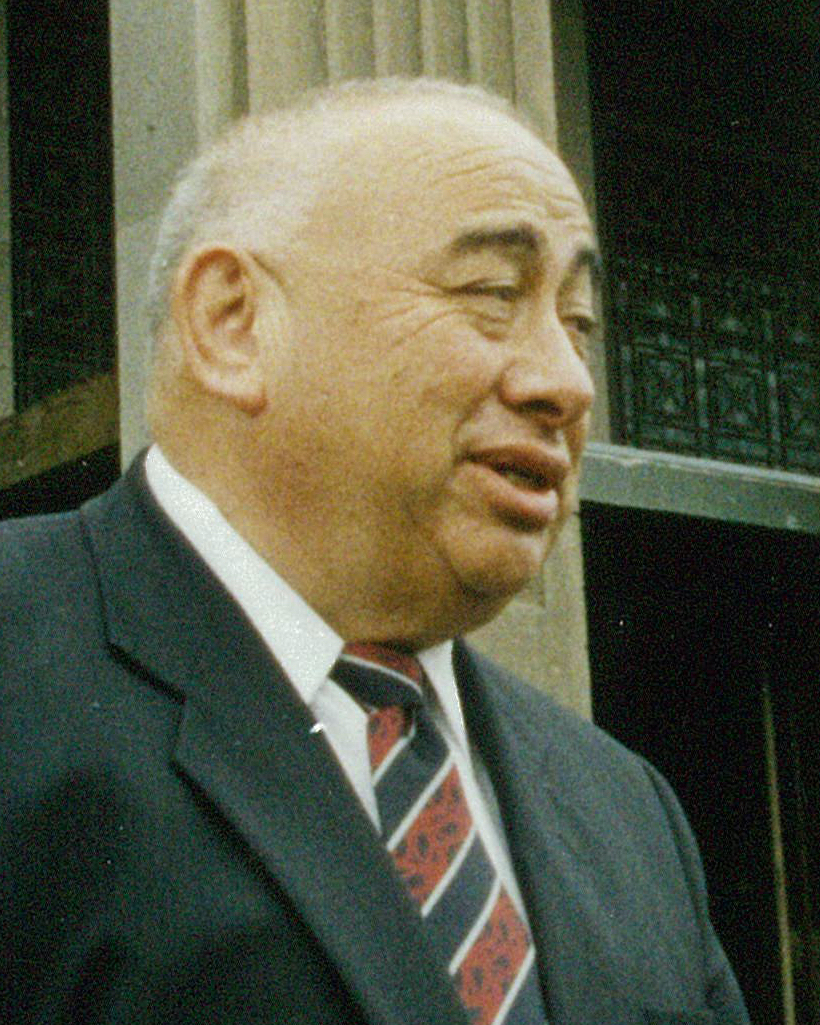
- Sir Ngātata Love in 1998
- Born: September 7, 1937; Lower Hutt, New Zealand
- Died: October 17, 2018 (aged 81); Korokoro, New Zealand
- Occupations: Academic, negotiator, Māori leader
- Title: Professor Emeritus
- Parent(s): Sir Ralph Love; Lady Flora Love (née Heberley)
- Awards: New Zealand 1990 Commemoration Medal (1990); Companion of the Queen's Service Order (2001); Knight Grand Companion of the New Zealand Order of Merit (GNZM, 2009)

Sir Ralph Heberley Love GNZM QSO JP (7 September 1937 – 17 October 2018), known as Ngātata Love, was a New Zealand Waitangi Tribunal negotiator, academic and Māori leader. Love was a professor emeritus of business development at Victoria University of Wellington's Victoria Management School. In 2016 he was convicted of defrauding his own iwi, taking payments of $1.5 million.

== Biography ==
Ralph Heberley Love was born in 1937, the son of the Te Āti Awa leader Ralph Love, and his wife, Flora Love (née Heberley). He was educated at Wellington College and attended university part-time. When his father was elected Mayor of Petone in 1965 he was likewise elected as a member of the Petone Borough Council at the same election. Both he and his father were defeated at the 1968 elections.

In 1990, Love was awarded the New Zealand 1990 Commemoration Medal. In the 2001 New Year Honours, Love was appointed a Companion of the Queen's Service Order for public services. He was made a Principal Companion of the New Zealand Order of Merit for services to Māori in the 2009 New Year Honours, and later that year accepted re-designation as a Knight Grand Companion of the same order following the restoration of titular honours by the New Zealand government.

At the same time Love stated that he is a supporter of a New Zealand republic and that "Even though I am an avowed republican, we must never abandon the history we share with Britain. Particularly at times of conflict."

In March 2009, Love suggested that secondary students should have the option of going to wānanga (Māori tertiary institutions) rather than staying at school.

Three years later he stepped aside from a number of positions representing Māori and the Serious Fraud Office said it was investigating a matter in relation to the Wellington Tenths Trust. In August 2016, Love went on trial, accused of defrauding his iwi. The Crown accused Love of taking two payments worth $1.5 million in late 2006 and early 2007. The payments were in exchange for showing favour toward Redwood Group, a property developer looking to develop Wellington Tenths Trust land near Parliament. He was found guilty on 1 September 2016. Love was subsequently sentenced to two and a half years imprisonment.

He died at his home in Korokoro on 17 October 2018 and was privately cremated without a tangi. At the time of his death, Love was being pursued for bankruptcy by the lawyers from his criminal trial.

Notable students of Love include Takiora Ingram.
