= Huggen =

Huggen is a surname. Notable people with the surname include:

- Thomas Huggen (by 1521–1586), English politician
- Mother Huggen, fictional character

== See also ==
- Huggan
