= Rae Weston =

New Zealand professor of banking

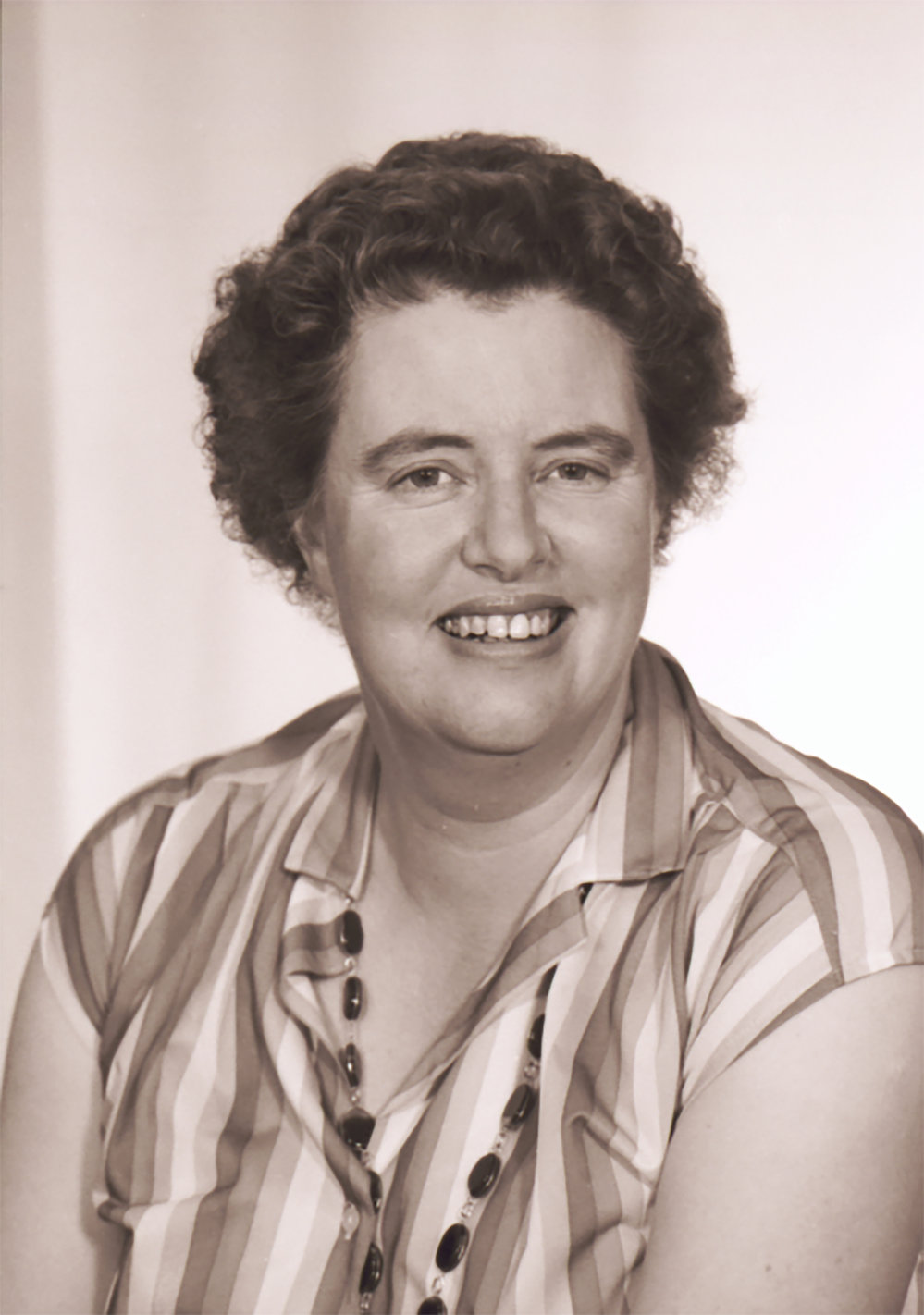
- Born: Caryl Rae Weston; 18 December 1941; Oamaru, New Zealand
- Died: 4 October 2014; Harrington Park, New South Wales, Australia
- Resting place: Macquarie Park Cemetery and Crematorium

Academic background
- Education: University of Melbourne; Monash University

Academic work
- Discipline: Economics; banking
- Institutions: La Trobe University; Massey University; Macquarie University
- Doctoral students: Takiora Ingram

Caryl Rae Weston (18 December 1941 – 4 October 2014) was a New Zealand academic, and was the first woman professor at Massey University, appointed in 1984. She held the Chair of Banking and Management.

== Academic career ==
Born in Oamaru in 1941, Weston attended Queen Margaret College in Wellington. Weston studied commerce at the University of Melbourne, where she earned an honours degree in 1966, and then moved to Monash University, where she gained a Bachelor of Jurisprudence and a Bachelor of Laws. She followed these degrees with a PhD on the predictability of Australian share markets, also at Monash, in 1972. Weston worked at the School of Economics at La Trobe University in Australia, where she was a senior lecturer.

Weston then joined the faculty of Massey University in New Zealand, rising to full professor in 1984. She was the first woman professor at Massey, and held the Chair of Banking and Management. Professors Glynnis Cropp, head of modern languages, and Nancy Kinross, Chair of Nursing Studies, were appointed at Massey the following year. Weston wrote a number of books and published extensively. Among the topics she published on are monetary policy, foreign exchange risk exposure and commercial crime. She also wrote a world survey on gold. One of Weston's notable doctoral students is governmental marine conservation advisor Takiora Ingram. In 1988 Weston was appointed to the Board of New Zealand's Earthquake and War Damage Commission (now EQC).

== Personal life ==
Weston was awarded a university blue in badminton, and was active in the sport's administration in New Zealand. Weston died in Harrington Park, Sydney in 2014, and is buried at Macquarie Park Cemetery.

== Selected works ==
- Weston, Rae (1980). Domestic and Multinational Banking: The Effects of Monetary Policy. Columbia University Press. ISBN 9780231050586.
- Weston, Rae (1983). Gold: a world survey. Routledge. doi:10.4324/9780203097588. ISBN 9780203097588.
- Weston, Rae (1986). Managing foreign exchange risk exposure. Sydney: Law Book Co. ISBN 0455206252.
- Weston, Rae (1987). Combating commercial crime. Sydney: Law Book Co. ISBN 0455207526.
- Edwards, Robin; Weston, Rae (1986). International trade finance: a guide to the instruments and techniques of Australian exports. Sydney: Law Book Co. ISBN 0455203504.
- Weston, Rae. The Role Of Intangible Assets And Other Accounting Issues In A Corporate Disaster.
