= John Miles (microbiologist) =

New Zealand microbiologist (1913–2004)

John Miles CBE
- Born: John Arthur Reginald Miles; 13 May 1913; Sidcup, Kent, England
- Died: 14 February 2004 (aged 90); Wānaka, New Zealand
- Scientific career
- Fields: Microbiology
- Institutions: University of Otago

John Arthur Reginald Miles CBE (13 May 1913 – 14 February 2004) was a New Zealand microbiologist and epidemiologist. He was in charge of the Department of Microbiology at Otago Medical School from 1955 to 1978, and became an Emeritus Professor in 1979.

In the 1971 New Year Honours, Miles was appointed a Commander of the Order of the British Empire, for services to science.
