= Takiora Ingram =

Cook Islander marine conservationist

Takiora Ingram is a senior governmental policy advisor on marine conservation from the Cook Islands.

== Early life ==
Ingram was born in Rarotonga. Her mother was Poko Ingram, who was the first woman elected to the Cook Islands Legislative Assembly in 1961. She completed a B.A. in Anthropology, with High Honors, and an M.A. in Urban and Regional Planning at the University of Hawaiʻi. In 1990 she completed a PhD at Massey University, New Zealand, in business management and public policy. Her thesis was supervised by Ngātata Love, Tony Vitalis and Rae Weston.

== Career ==
Ingram's career has been focused on marine conservation. In the 1980s she worked at the Pacific Islands Forum in Fiji on regional tourism developments. From 1990 to 2004 she served as a senior policy advisor to the governments of the Cook Islands (General Licensing Authority), New Zealand (Te Puni Kokiri), and New South Wales (Department of Community Services). From 2006 to July 2013, Ingram worked for the U.S. National Oceanographic and Atmospheric Administration (NOAA) serving as Executive Director of the All Islands Coral Reef Committee (AIC) Secretariat based in Honolulu, Hawaii.

=== Community activities ===
On returning to the Cook Islands from her studies in New Zealand, Ingram approached other professional women and proposed they join together to form a women's organisation to focus on issues of women's rights, domestic violence, health, equality and the importance of a female political voice. The group has evolved into the present-day Cook Island Business and Professional Women's Association (CIBPW). In 1993 Ingram withdrew from her involvement with CIBPW to serve as the founding president of Punanga Tauturu, an organisation which provides counselling support and legal services to women and children in domestic violence situations.

Ingram has also been a strong advocate and supporter of the arts and culture of the Cook Islands. She was Chair of the Pacific Islands Arts Committee of Creative New Zealand from 1996 to 2000 and President of the Pacific Wave Association in Sydney, Australia from 2001 to 2005. She was the founding director of the Pacific Writers’ Connection and has organised annual creative/environmental writing workshops for adults, and an annual environmental writing competition for children.

=== Recognition ===
In 2013, Ingram received an 'Oceania Star' award from the University of Hawaiʻi Pacific Business Center Program, an award which recognises the contributions of women in the Pacific islands. Ingram has also received an award from the U.S. Coral Reef Task Force for her service.
