= Russell Matthews =

New Zealand civil engineer (1896–1987)

Sir Russell Matthews OBE (19 July 1896 – 25 November 1987) was a New Zealand civil engineer, roading contractor, businessman, horticulturist and philanthropist. He was born in New Plymouth on 19 July 1896.

== Career ==
Matthews was mostly involved in roading construction.

== Personal life ==
Matthews was passionate for horticulture and was a fellow of the Royal New Zealand Institute of Horticulture. He was a member of the New Zealand Rhododendron Association and founded the Pukeiti Rhododendron Trust.

== Tūpare ==
Matthews bought a property in New Plymouth in 1932 to build a homestead and establish a garden. Matthews named the property Tūpare.

== Honours ==
Matthews was appointed an Officer of the Order of the British Empire in the 1971 New Year Honours, for services to the community, and a Knight Bachelor in the 1982 New Year Honours, for services to horticulture and the community.

In 2018, Matthews was posthumously inducted into the New Zealand Business Hall of Fame.
