= Eruera Love =

New Zealand soldier and rugby player (1905–1942)

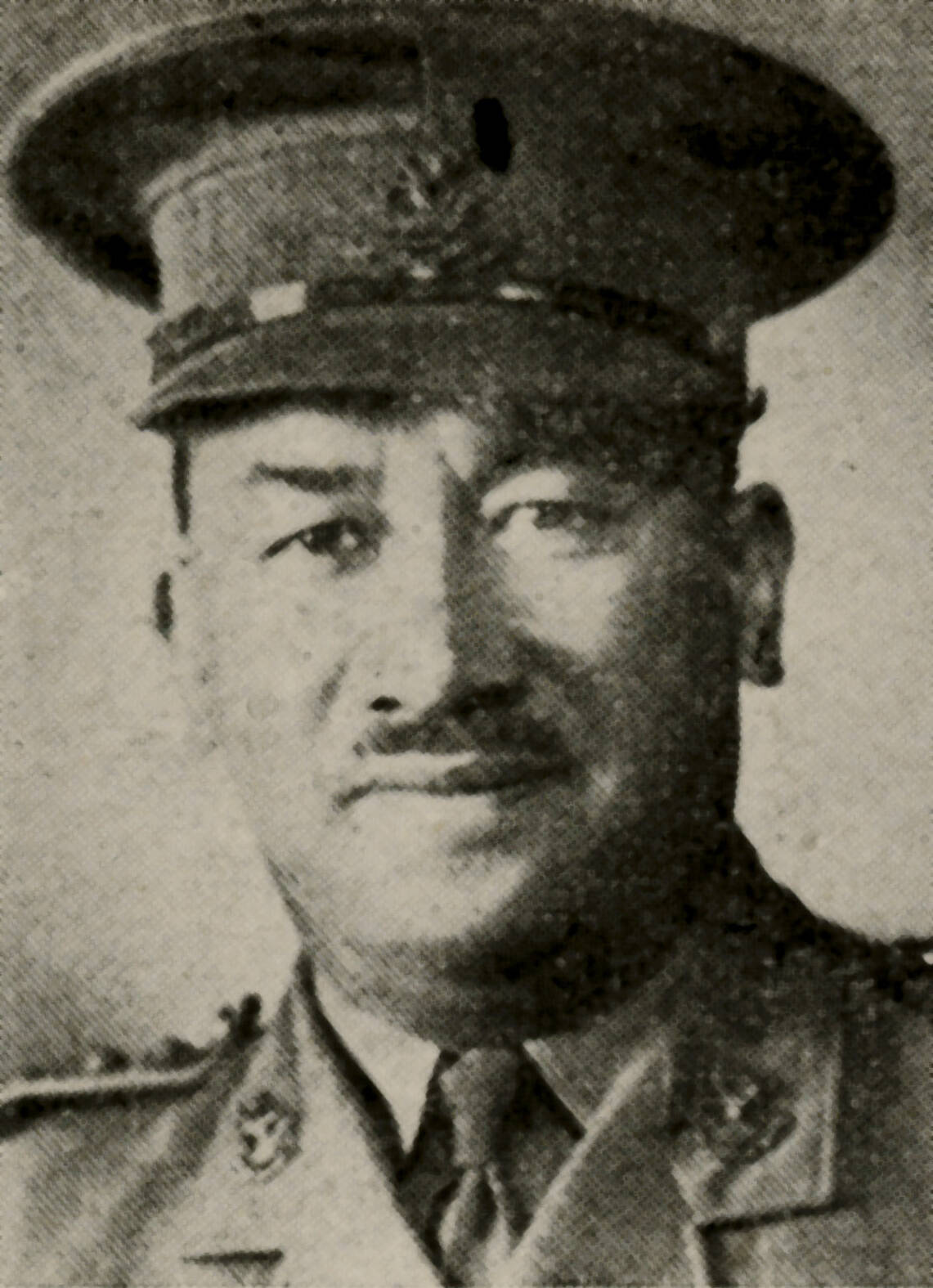
- Love in 1942
- Born: Eruera Te Whiti o Rongomai Love; 18 May 1905; Waikawa Bay, Marlborough Sounds, New Zealand
- Died: 12 July 1942 (aged 37) near Ruweisat Ridge, Egypt
- Resting place: El Alamein War Cemetery
- Spouse: Takau Margaret Tinirau Makea Rio
- Children: 4
- Relatives: Ripeka Wharawhara Love (mother)
- Military career
- Allegiance: New Zealand
- Branch: New Zealand Military Forces
- Service years: 1922–1942
- Rank: Lieutenant colonel
- Nicknames: "Tiwi"; "The Bull"
- Commands: 28th (Māori) Battalion (1942)
- Conflicts: World War II: Battle of Greece; Battle of Crete; Operation Crusader; Minqar Qaim; First Battle of El Alamein †
- Awards: Mentioned in despatches

Eruera Te Whiti o Rongomai Love (18 May 1905 – 12 July 1942), also known as Edward Love and to his family and soldiers as Tiwi, was a New Zealand rugby player, interpreter and soldier. A member of the Māori All Blacks in the 1920s and a long-serving Territorial officer, he helped form the 28th (Māori) Battalion at the start of the Second World War and in May 1942 became the first Māori to command it. He was mortally wounded near Ruweisat Ridge in Egypt two months later.

== Early life ==
Love was born on 18 May 1905 at the Top House, the Love family homestead at Waikawa Bay in the Marlborough Sounds, the second son among the seven surviving children of Wī Hapi Pākau Love and Rīpeka Wharawhara Mātene. Through his mother, a great-granddaughter of Hōniana Te Puni-kōkopu, he belonged to the Ngāti Te Whiti and Ngāti Tāwhirikura hapū of Te Āti Awa and to Ngāti Ruanui; his father was a great-grandson of the whaler John Agar Love and Mere Rure Te Hikanui of the Taranaki iwi. He was also a descendant of the whānau of the Parihaka prophet Te Whiti o Rongomai, after whom he was named. Both his parents were later appointed OBE for their work in the Māori community of the Hutt Valley.

In 1911 the family moved from their sheep station on Arapaoa Island to Petone, where they built the family home, Taumata, at Korokoro. Love attended Petone West School, joined the school cadets at the age of eleven and went into the Territorial Force in 1922, reaching second lieutenant by 1926 and later captain and company commander in the 1st Battalion, Wellington Regiment. He studied law at Victoria University College in 1924 and 1925 and became an interpreter with the Native Land Court. At his father's wish he researched and recorded the family whakapapa, and he was expected in time to take up the leadership of the family.

== Sport ==
Love rowed for the Petone Rowing Club and played in the local Māori cricket eleven, but rugby was his main game. He played for Petone and then for Wellington, and was selected for the Māori All Blacks in 1925 and 1926, including the 1926–27 tour of France, Britain, Canada, Australia and Ceylon.

== Marriage and family ==
Love's mother had once billeted two Rarotongan sisters during school holidays, and when the ship carrying the 1926 Māori team called at Rarotonga he met the elder, Takau (Margaret) Tinirau Makea Rio, again. They married on 17 September 1928 at Pare-o-Tāne, on the marae of Taputapuatea in Rarotonga. Takau's father gave her the title Rio Rangatira and gave Love the title Rangi Makea. The couple lived in Rarotonga for three years, where twin daughters were born in 1930 and Love learned the language and traditions of his wife's people and the responsibilities of the Makea Nui Ariki title, which was to pass to their eldest child, Rio Rangatira Mokoroa ki Aitu Love.

They returned to New Zealand in 1931 after the birth of a third daughter, and by 1934, when a fourth was born, were settled at Taumata. Love went back to the Native Land Court and the Territorials, and was a driving force in the fundraising for the Te Tatau-o-te-Pō meeting house near Taumata, built chiefly to house Taranaki relations who came to Wellington on land business. It opened on 18 October 1933, and he was its first administrator and treasurer.

== Second World War ==
At the outbreak of the Second World War, Love was seconded to Army Headquarters in Wellington to help form the Māori Battalion, and in January 1940 he was posted to the new unit. He briefly commanded D Company and then Headquarters Company, and sailed with the main body on the Aquitania in May 1940. After six months in England the battalion reached Egypt in March 1941. A solidly built man who roared his orders, he was nicknamed "The Bull" by his men.

The battalion went to Greece in late March 1941 and held positions at Olympus Pass before the withdrawal and evacuation to Crete. On the night of 22 May the battalion was ordered to counter-attack Maleme airfield, which the Germans had captured. Love became cut off with about ten men, and early on 23 May, under heavy anti-tank and machine-gun fire, they rushed the guns and killed the crews; Love was wounded in the shoulder but carried on through several more days of fighting until the evacuation to Alexandria.

When the battalion's commander, Lieutenant Colonel George Dittmer, was wounded in the attack on Sollum on 23 November 1941 during Operation Crusader, command passed to Love, then a captain. During his two weeks in temporary command the battalion captured fifteen enemy vehicles at Musaid and, sent to Menastir to cut the supply road from Bardia, defeated troops of the 15th Panzer Division on 3 December and forced a German withdrawal. He then handed over to Lieutenant Colonel Humphrey Dyer and, before leaving for hospital to have the Crete wound treated, addressed the battalion urging the men to treat prisoners of war well. The battalion's padre, Kahi Harawira, later wrote that Love had used Māori tactics in an action another colonel called a classic, and had forbidden his men to use explosive bullets against the enemy.

After recovering in Cairo, Love rejoined the battalion in Syria in March 1942 as second-in-command with the rank of major. In May, Dyer asked to be relieved, and on 13 May Love was promoted to temporary lieutenant colonel and appointed to command, on the recommendation of his brigade commander and with the approval of Lieutenant General Bernard Freyberg, who cabled the Minister of Defence that Love had done particularly well in temporary command. He was the first Māori to command the battalion and the first to hold the rank, and the appointment was greeted with jubilation in the battalion and at home.

After the fall of Tobruk the New Zealand Division returned to the desert and on 25 June took up positions at Minqar Qaim. Encircled by the 21st Panzer Division on 27 June, the division broke out early the next morning with the Māori Battalion leading alongside the 19th and 20th Battalions, and reached the El Alamein line; the battalion came through with comparatively few casualties, which the 1966 Encyclopaedia of New Zealand attributes to Love's leadership.

In early July the division was ordered to attack Ruweisat Ridge, near El Alamein. The attack went in on 11 July and developed into a siege. Just after dusk, Love and his adjutant, Captain Ace Wood, drove forward to see how the men were faring; the vehicle drew enemy fire and Love was mortally wounded. He died that night and was buried at El Alamein War Cemetery. Announcing his death, the Minister of Defence, Frederick Jones, said that New Zealand and the Māori people had lost a leader whose qualities had been proved on the battlefields of the Middle East. He was mentioned in despatches.

Love was survived by his wife, who died in Rarotonga in 1947, and their four daughters.

== Legacy ==
On his appointment to command, Love had written to his mother asking for strength, wisdom, courage and justice; the letter was published in the Waiapu Church Gazette in 1945 by the Bishop of Aotearoa, who suggested it be printed and given to every school in the country. Love is one of nearly a hundred Māori buried at El Alamein, and when the memorial there was unveiled in 1954 the battalion was represented by one of his successors in command, Charles Bennett. Five more Māori officers commanded the battalion after him.
