= Ripeka Wharawhara Love =

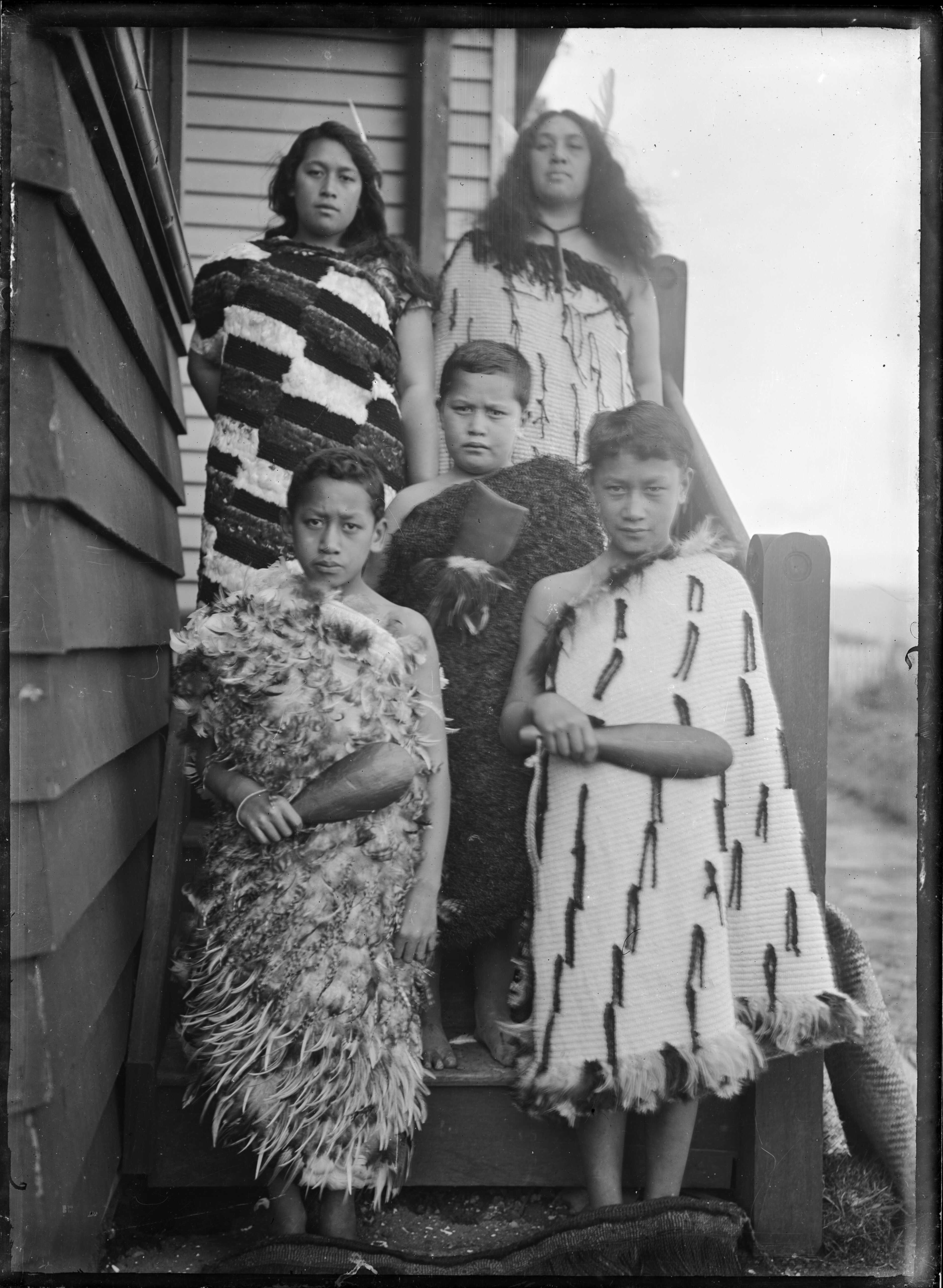
Ripeka Love with four of her children, 1916

Ripeka Wharawhara Love OBE (28 June 1882 – 6 April 1953) was a New Zealand community leader. She was born on 28 June 1882 and was a member of Te Āti Awa.

At age 15, Ripeka Love married Wi Hapi Pakau Love with whom she had ten children, seven surviving infancy. Two of the male children were Eruera Te Whiti o Rongomai Love and Makere Rangiatea Ralph Love. She was named an Officer of the Order of the British Empire in 1918.
