= Annie Huggan =

New Zealand mayor (1890 – 1983)

Annie Huggan MBE
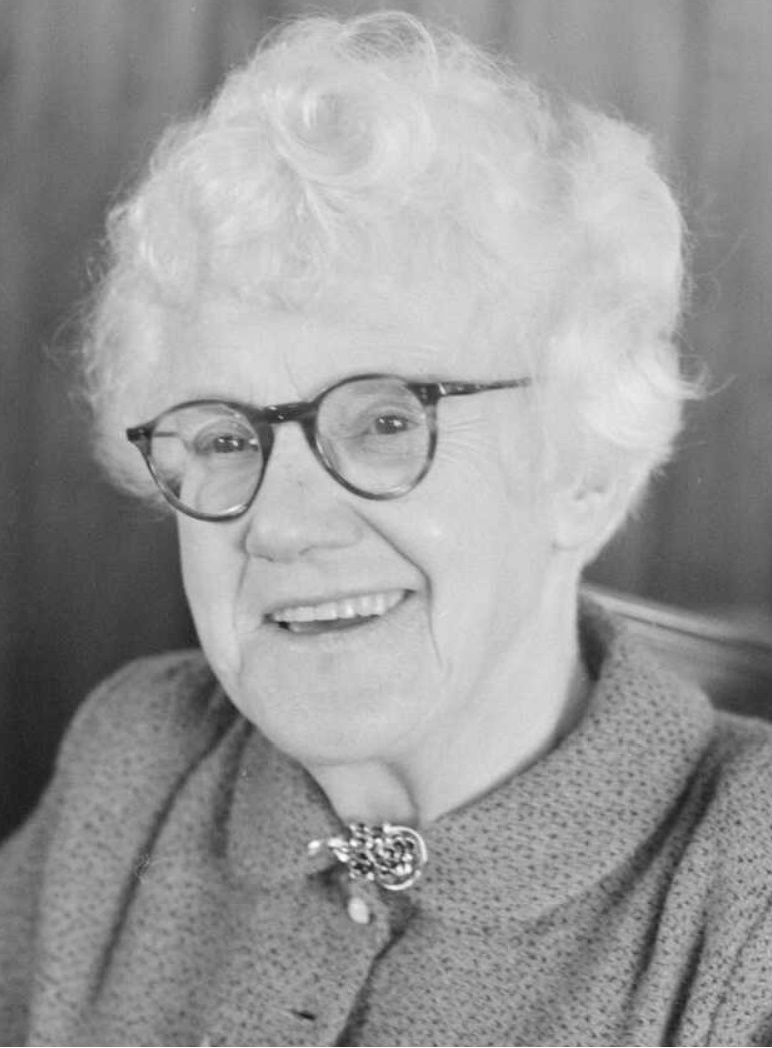

13th Mayor of Petone
- In office 1 October 1957 – 9 October 1965
- Deputy: Joe May
- Preceded by: Joe Huggan
- Succeeded by: Ralph Love

Personal details
- Born: Lily Annie Brown; 10 March 1890 Halifax, Yorkshire, England
- Died: 4 May 1983 (aged 93) Lower Hutt, New Zealand
- Party: Labour
- Spouse: Joe Huggan (m. 1923)
- Profession: Textile worker

Lily Annie Huggan MBE (10 March 1890 – 4 May 1983) was an English-born New Zealand politician.

== Biography ==
=== Early life and career ===
Huggan was born at Halifax in 1890 to cabinet maker John Henry Brown and his wife Rebecca Grundy Morton. She received her education in Brighouse and later Huddersfield. She spent 20 years working in local textile mills after leaving school. Eventually becoming a percher, a textile worker who inspects cloth, heading the mill's finishing department. The son of her boss asked her to marry him, however the proposal came too late as she had already planned to emigrate overseas, having been persuaded to do so by her father's uncle who lived in Auckland.

In December 1922 Huggan emigrated to New Zealand along with her parents and an older brother, settling in Wellington. Soon after arriving she met Joseph Mitchell Huggan and on 14 July 1923 the two married at St Hilda's Church, Upper Hutt. No children came from the marriage. In 1924 her family moved from Upper Hutt to Korokoro, where she worked at a woollen mill. In 1932 she and her husband began to run the Korokoro general store, initially located in the front room of their house. The store would later additionally host a post office and Huggan also established a business where she did invisible garment mending. Her father-in-law and mother-in-law came to live with them so they purchased a 4½ acre section behind their store in 1933 to build her in-law's their own dwelling. During the Great Depression the Huggan's worked with the unemployed as part of the local relief committee. She supplied home-made morning and afternoon teas and lunches to relief workers. Huggan and her husband became known the uncrowned 'mayor and mayoress of Korokoro' for their efforts. She was secretary of the Korokoro Progressive Association from 1935 until the 1950s. The association organised summer carnivals and she taught girls at the local school in maypole dancing.

In 1950 her husband was elected Mayor of Petone leading them to move from Korokoro to Cuba Street in Petone. There they lived with her elderly uncle, Bill. In a jovial gesture she was presented with a brooch in 1954 by her husband (as mayor) to compensate for the amount of time he had been late home from night meetings.

=== Political career ===
Her husband died suddenly of a brain hemorrhage on 6 September 1957 at Hutt Hospital. Before her husband had even been buried, the Petone Labour Party branch asked Annie to stand for the mayoralty. She was given five days to decide. She spoke to the Town Clerk, her minister, a bank manager, several friends and wrote to her sister-in-law in Hawke's Bay about it. She wondered if the offer was serious or if it had been made out of sympathy. After initially being likely to decline the offer she received a telegram from her sister-in-law which said "It is what Joe would have liked" which led Huggan to change her mind and accepted the offer. She was duly announced as the Labour Party's candidate for the mayoral by-election. However no other candidates came forward and she was elected unopposed. She was the Petone Borough Council's representative on the State Advances Corporation's Hutt Valley housing allocation committee and the Hutt Park committee. Same as her husband, she was fiercely opposed to the suggestion of amalgamation of Petone with the neighbouring city of Lower Hutt.

In 1964 the Petone Borough Council opened a long-planned refuse tip in the western hills. Controversially, it was adjacent to a scenic reserve which upset residents and environmentalists. Huggan and two other councillors were deselected by the Labour Party for the 1965 election. She stood as an independent, but lost to her replacement as Labour Party candidate Ralph Love. She placed third out of four candidates and stated the day after the election that she knew she would lose, but was not discouraged nor disappointed by defeat.

=== Later life and death ===
Huggan returned to her invisible-mending business after losing the mayoralty, however she continued an active public life including being the chair of the Hutt Valley Patriotic Welfare Committee. In the 1971 New Year Honours, Huggan was appointed a Member of the Order of the British Empire (MBE) for services to the community especially as mayor of Petone.

Huggan died aged 93 on 4 May 1983 at the Bloomfield Hospice, Lower Hutt.

Political offices
Preceded by Joe Huggan	Mayor of Petone; 1957–1965	Succeeded by Ralph Love
