= Wellington Regiment =

Wellington Regiment may refer to:

== Cavalry regiments ==
- Wellington Mounted Rifles Regiment (1914–1919)
- Queen Alexandra's (Wellington West Coast) Mounted Rifles
- Wellington East Coast Mounted Rifles

== Infantry regiments ==
- Duke of Wellington's Regiment (1702–2006)
- Wellington West Coast Regiment (1860-1948)
- Wellington Regiment (City of Wellington's Own) (1867–1964)
- Wellington Infantry Regiment (NZEF) (1914–1919)
- 153rd (Wellington) Battalion, CEF (1915–1917)
- Wellington West Coast and Taranaki Regiment (1948–2012)
- 7th (Wellington (City of Wellington's Own) and Hawke's Bay) Battalion, Royal New Zealand Infantry Regiment (1964–2012)
