= George Gee (mayor) =

New Zealand mayor

George Gee JP QSO

15th Mayor of Petone
- In office 12 October 1968 – 28 October 1980
- Preceded by: Ralph Love
- Succeeded by: Ron Marston

Personal details
- Born: 11 November 1921 New Plymouth, New Zealand
- Died: 27 March 1984 (aged 62) Petone, New Zealand
- Spouse: Dorothy Bing (m. 1940)
- Children: 2
- Profession: Grocer

George Gee JP QSO (11 November 1921 – 27 March 1984) was a New Zealand businessman and local politician. He was the first Asian New Zealander elected to a mayoralty.

== Biography ==
Gee was born in New Plymouth in 1921 and was educated at Palmerston North Boys' High School. He and his family moved to Petone in 1938. He married Dorothy Bing in 1940, having met in Blenheim, with whom he had one son and one daughter. He and all of his family were fluent speakers of Chinese. In World War II he served domestically in the Army Service Corp from 1942 to 1944. He suffered an injury in an accident which invalided him from service just before he was to be posted overseas.

After the war he worked in his family's greengrocer and fruiterer shop on Jackson Street in Petone. From 1956 to 1961 he was President of the New Zealand Federation of Fruit Retailers & Greengrocers. He was also a Rotary member and was President of Petone Rotary from 1966 to 1967.

In 1965 he was elected a member of the Petone Borough Council. Three years later he stood for the mayoralty, challenging Ralph Love. He defeated Love and became Mayor of Petone, the first time an Asian had been elected to the office of mayor in New Zealand. He was also a member of the Wellington Regional Planning Authority (WRPA) from 1968 to 1974. In 1980 he retired from the mayoralty, citing ill health. He did stand for the newly created Wellington Regional Council (that replaced the WRPA) which met less regularly.

Gee was also a member of the Wellington Harbour Board representing Petone. He was first elected in 1971 but was defeated in 1974. Re-elected to the board in 1977 he retired in 1983.

He died in March 1984 at his home, aged 63. He was survived by his wife, two children and five grandchildren.

== Honours ==
In 1977, Gee was awarded the Queen Elizabeth II Silver Jubilee Medal. In the 1981 Queen's Birthday Honours, Gee was appointed a Companion of the Queen's Service Order for public services. George Gee Drive in Korokoro is named in his honour.

== Notes ==
Political offices
Preceded by Ralph Love	Mayor of Petone; 1968–1980	Succeeded by Ron Marston
