= Ralph Love =

New Zealand mayor, public servant and Māori leader

Sir Ralph Love QSO JP
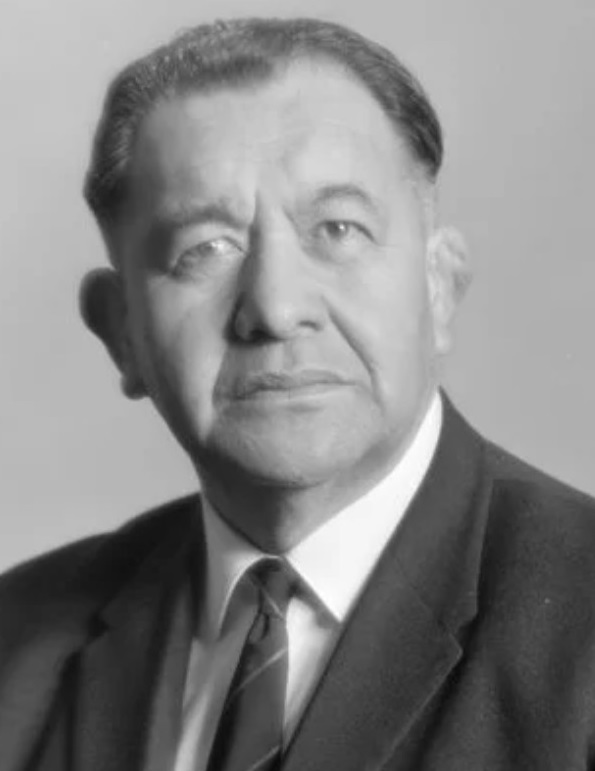

14th Mayor of Petone
- In office 26 March 1967 – 12 October 1968
- Preceded by: Joe May
- Succeeded by: George Gee
- In office 9 October 1965 – 27 January 1967
- Preceded by: Annie Huggan
- Succeeded by: Joe May

Member of the Wellington City Council
- In office 13 October 1962 – 9 October 1965
- Constituency: At-large

Personal details
- Born: 16 September 1907 Arapaoa Island, New Zealand
- Died: 22 August 1994 (aged 86) Wellington, New Zealand
- Party: Labour
- Spouse: Flora Heberley (m. 1933)
- Children: 2
- Profession: Public servant

Sir Makere Rangiatea "Ralph" Love QSO JP (16 September 1907 – 22 August 1994) was a New Zealand Māori public servant and leader of Te Āti Awa. One of his brothers was Eruera Te Whiti o Rongomai Love (18 May 1905 – 12 July 1942), a New Zealand rugby player, interpreter and military leader.

== Biography ==
He was born at Homebush on Arapaoa Island, Queen Charlotte Sound. His parents, Wi Hapi Pakau Love and Ripeka Wharawhara Love (28 June 1882 – 6 April 1953), who had ten children, seven of whom survived infancy, belonged to senior families of Te Āti Awa, Taranaki and Ngati Ruanui, with connections to most of the iwi of Taranaki, Wellington and the northern South Island. His mother Ripeka Wharawhara Love was a New Zealand community leader.

Love was a direct descendant of Ngati Te Whiti and Ngati Tawhirikura chiefs who controlled Petone and Ngauranga at the time of the Treaty of Waitangi. He was educated at Petone West School and Petone District High School. His father arranged for him to join the Native Trust Office as a cadet in 1925. Soon after, he became a clerk in the Native Department. On 6 May 1933, he married Flora Heberley, the daughter of carver Thomas "Tamati" Heberley. They had a daughter, Marie Nui Te He, and a son, Ralph Heberley Ngātata.

When the Second World War broke out Love joined the army, but was declared medically unfit for overseas service: in 1927 he had broken ribs playing rugby and developed tuberculosis. He served as a recruiting and liaison officer with the Māori War Effort Organisation, and in 1946 was appointed a justice of the peace. From 1944 to 1949, he served (at first unofficially) as parliamentary private secretary to MP and cabinet minister Sir Eruera Tirikatene. Love was Tirikatene's private secretary again in 1957–60, and worked closely with him and his successor and daughter, Whetu Tirikatene-Sullivan, for many years.

He was an active supporter of the New Zealand Labour Party. He was heavily involved in organising the inaugural conference of the Māori Women's Welfare League. His work in the Native (later Māori Affairs) Department included stints as assistant controller of social welfare, conversion officer and deputy registrar to the Māori Land Court. He was deputy chairman of the Wellington Tenths Trust. In 1962, he was elected to the Wellington City Council, and became Māori welfare officer for Wellington under the Department of Māori Affairs. In 1965, he retired from Māori Affairs and was elected to the Petone mayoralty on a Labour Party platform, defeating three other candidates including the incumbent mayor Annie Huggan who was deselected by the Labour Party in Love's favour. His son Ralph Heberley Ngātata Love (Ralph Jr.) was elected a borough councillor at the same election. In January 1967 he lost office after being convicted of technically breaching the Local Authorities (Members' Contracts) Act 1954 when he voted to increase his own pay. At the subsequent by-election he was re-elected mayor, defeating councillor Tom Watson who ran as an independent. He held office until October 1968 when he was defeated by councillor George Gee.

He petitioned to have the Treaty of Waitangi enshrined in legislation, and attempted to gain a guarantee that Māori representation in Parliament would be retained or increased. He also petitioned against proposed immigration legislation which would allow the British government to override the provision in the treaty for all the rights and privileges of British citizenship to be accorded to Māori, including the right to enter Britain. He even wrote directly to the British prime minister, Margaret Thatcher, objecting to this change.

He died in Wellington on 30 July 1994, the tangihanga was held at Pipitea and Te Tatau-o-te-Po marae, with the final service at Saint Paul's Cathedral, Wellington.

== Honours ==
In the 1975 Queen's Birthday Honours, Love was appointed a Companion of the Queen's Service Order for public services, for services to local-body affairs and the Māori people. He was appointed a Knight Bachelor in the 1987 Queen's Birthday Honours, for services to the Māori people and the community. In 1990, he received the New Zealand 1990 Commemoration Medal.

== Sources ==
- NZET Centre

Political offices
Preceded by Annie Huggan	Mayor of Petone; 1965–1967 1967-1968	Succeeded by Joe May
Preceded by Joe May	Mayor of Petone; 1965–1967 1967-1968	Succeeded by George Gee
