= Tūpare (garden) =

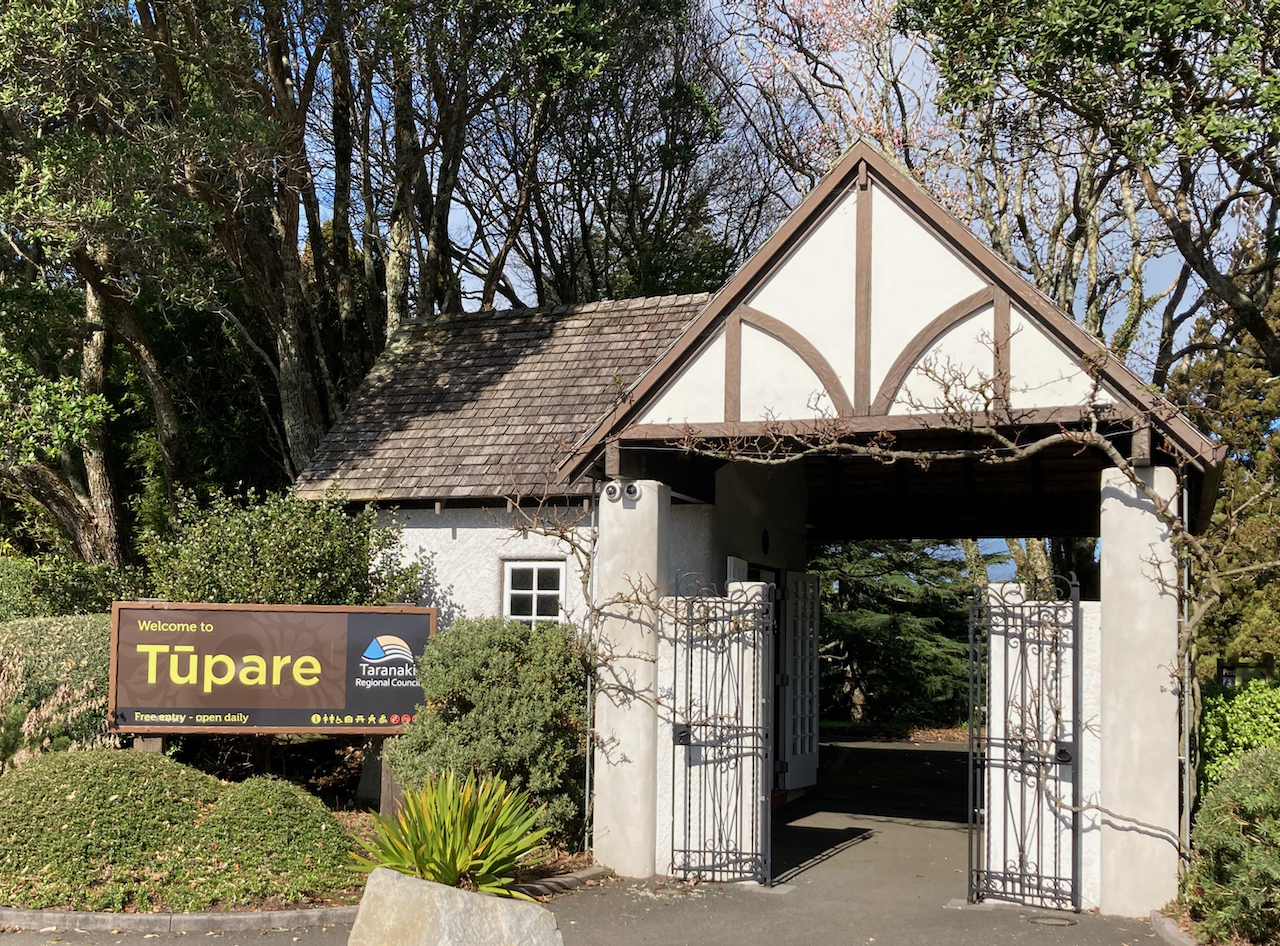
- Entrance to Tūpare

General information
- Type: Homestead
- Architectural style: Arts and Crafts
- Location: New Plymouth, 487 Mangorei Road, New Plymouth
- Coordinates: 39.08851°S 174.10976°E
- Year built: 1932–1944
- Owner: Taranaki Regional Council

Design and construction
- Architect: James Chapman-Taylor
- Main contractor: Russell Matthews

Tūpare is a historic homestead and garden in New Plymouth, New Zealand.

Tūpare is operated by the Taranaki Regional Council as a public park and event venue.

== Description ==
Tūpare is an Arts and Crafts homestead that overlooks the Waiwhakaiho River.

== History ==
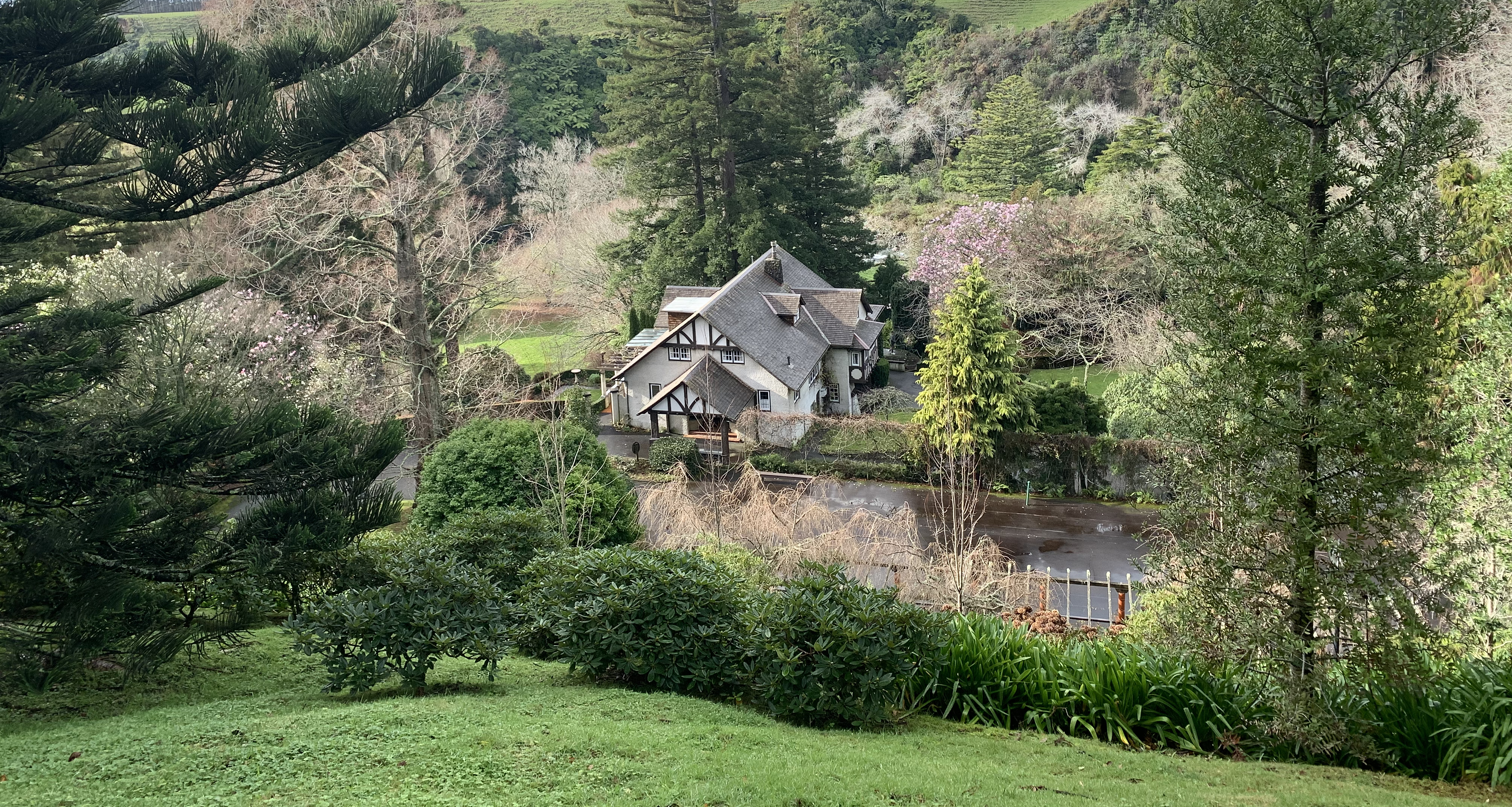
Tupare seen from up the hill

In 1932, the land of the property was purchased by Russell Matthews and his wife Mary Matthews (née Brodie). Russell had a passion for horticulture and was inspired by English gardens.

Russell spent 12 years building the home to a design from James Chapman-Taylor alongside developing the garden with it.

The garden was one of the four (public) gardens that formed a core of the original garden festival of New Plymouth.

Tūpare is now owned by the Taranaki Regional Council and is open as a public park.

== Legacy ==
The garden has the highest possible rating from the New Zealand Garden Trust and is 'considered a garden of international significance'.

It was awarded the 2020 Tripadvisor Travellers' Choice Award, one of ten gardens named worldwide.
