= Joe Huggan =

New Zealand mayor

Joe Huggan JP

12th Mayor of Petone
- In office 18 November 1950 – 6 September 1957
- Deputy: James Cumming
- Preceded by: Alec MacFarlane
- Succeeded by: Annie Huggan

Personal details
- Born: 16 June 1897 Pudsey, Yorkshire, England
- Died: 6 September 1957 (aged 60) Lower Hutt, New Zealand
- Party: Labour
- Spouse: Annie Brown (m. 1923)
- Profession: Retailer

Joseph Mitchell Huggan JP (16 June 1897 – 6 September 1957) was an English-born New Zealand politician.

== Biography ==
=== Early life and career ===
Huggan was born in 1897 at Pudsey, Yorkshire. He was the son of stonemason Jonathan Huggan and his wife Hannah Mitchell. He was employed in the spinning trade in his youth. During World War I he served in France with the West Yorkshire Regiment.

After the war he emigrated to New Zealand. On 14 July 1923 he married Annie Brown at St Hilda's Church in Upper Hutt. No children came from the marriage.

Huggan worked at the Petone woolen mill. In 1924 his family moved from Upper Hutt to Korokoro, where he worked as a labourer. In 1932 he and his wife began to run the Korokoro general store, initially located in the front room of their house. The store would later additionally host a post office. He possessed a vehicle and operated a delivery service as well. Huggan's parents came to live with him so he purchased a 4½ acre section behind their store in 1933 to build them their own dwelling.

During the Great Depression Huggan worked with the unemployed as part of the local relief committee. Huggan and his wife became known the uncrowned 'mayor and mayoress of Korokoro' for their efforts. For his community work he became a justice of the peace in 1932 and was president of the Korokoro Progressive Association which in November 1931, after much lobbying, got a bus service to the area started. The association organised summer carnivals in 1934 and 1935.

=== Political career ===
In 1935 Huggan was elected to the Petone Borough Council on the Labour Party ticket. He was a popular councillor, known for his "Yorkshire wit" and cheery demeanour. His wife was often an advisor to him on community matters. In 1950 he was elected mayor. As mayor he moved from Korokoro to Cuba Street in Petone to live with an elderly uncle of his wife. He was returned unopposed for two further terms as mayor and was also on the fire board, the milk board and the Hutt Valley drainage, power and river boards. He was fiercely opposed to the suggestion of amalgamation with the neighbouring city of Lower Hutt.

Huggan instigated a street widening policy. The plan was for the council to purchase buildings in disrepair along the Petone Esplanade to widen the street. A multi-lane roadway on the esplanade was then built which linked up to a recently constructed pipe bridge at the mouth of the Hutt River. In a jovial gesture he presented his wife in 1954 with a brooch to compensate for the amount of time he had been late home from night meetings.

In 1953, Huggan was awarded the Queen Elizabeth II Coronation Medal.

=== Death ===
Huggan died suddenly of a brain hemorrhage on 6 September 1957 at Hutt Hospital. His wife succeeded him as mayor, becoming one of the first husband-wife combinations to be mayors in New Zealand after Michael and Elizabeth Yates.

Political offices
Preceded by Alec MacFarlane	Mayor of Petone; 1950–1957	Succeeded by Annie Huggan
