= James Cumming (New Zealand politician) =

New Zealand politician

The Honourable James Cumming MLC
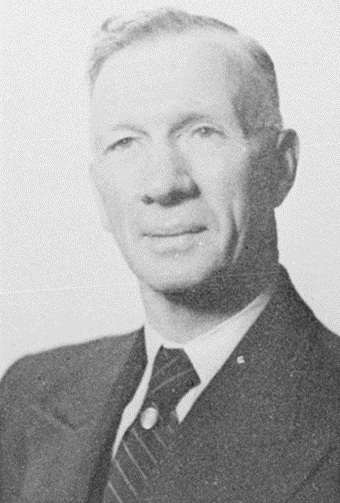

Member of the Legislative Council
- In office 23 June 1941 – 31 December 1950
- Appointed by: Peter Fraser

Personal details
- Born: 21 May 1879 Malvern, New Zealand
- Died: 20 October 1971 (aged 92) Lower Hutt, New Zealand
- Party: Labour
- Occupation: Trade Unionist

James Cumming (21 May 1879 – 20 October 1971) was a New Zealand trade unionist and politician.

== Biography ==
Cumming was born in 1879 at Malvern, Canterbury. Cumming was a miner on the West Coast and in the Waikato. He was the chairman of the North Island Miners' District Council. He was an expert in tunneling and worked on the Ōrongorongo Tunnel to improve Wellington's water supply system.

In 1920 he came to Petone, in the Hutt Valley. He subsequently found employment as a waterfront worker and was the president of the Wellington Waterside Workers' Union for two years. Via trade unions he became active in the Labour Party and became president of the Hutt Labour Representation Committee and was also secretary of the Labour Party's Petone branch. In 1930 he was elected a member of the Petone Borough Council. He was twice Labour's candidate for the Petone mayoralty. At the 1944 local election he was defeated for the mayoralty by Harold Green and in 1947 he lost to Alexander MacFarlane. In 1950 he became deputy mayor and was acting mayor for a month in 1957 after the death of Joe Huggan.

He was a member of the New Zealand Legislative Council from 23 June 1941 to 22 June 1948; and 23 June 1948 to 31 December 1950, when the council was abolished. He was appointed by the First Labour Government.

Cumming was also a member of the Wellington Harbour Board. He was first elected in 1947 and was to serve as a member for twelve years until 1959 representing Hutt.

He died on 20 October 1971, aged 92.
