= Mayor of Petone =

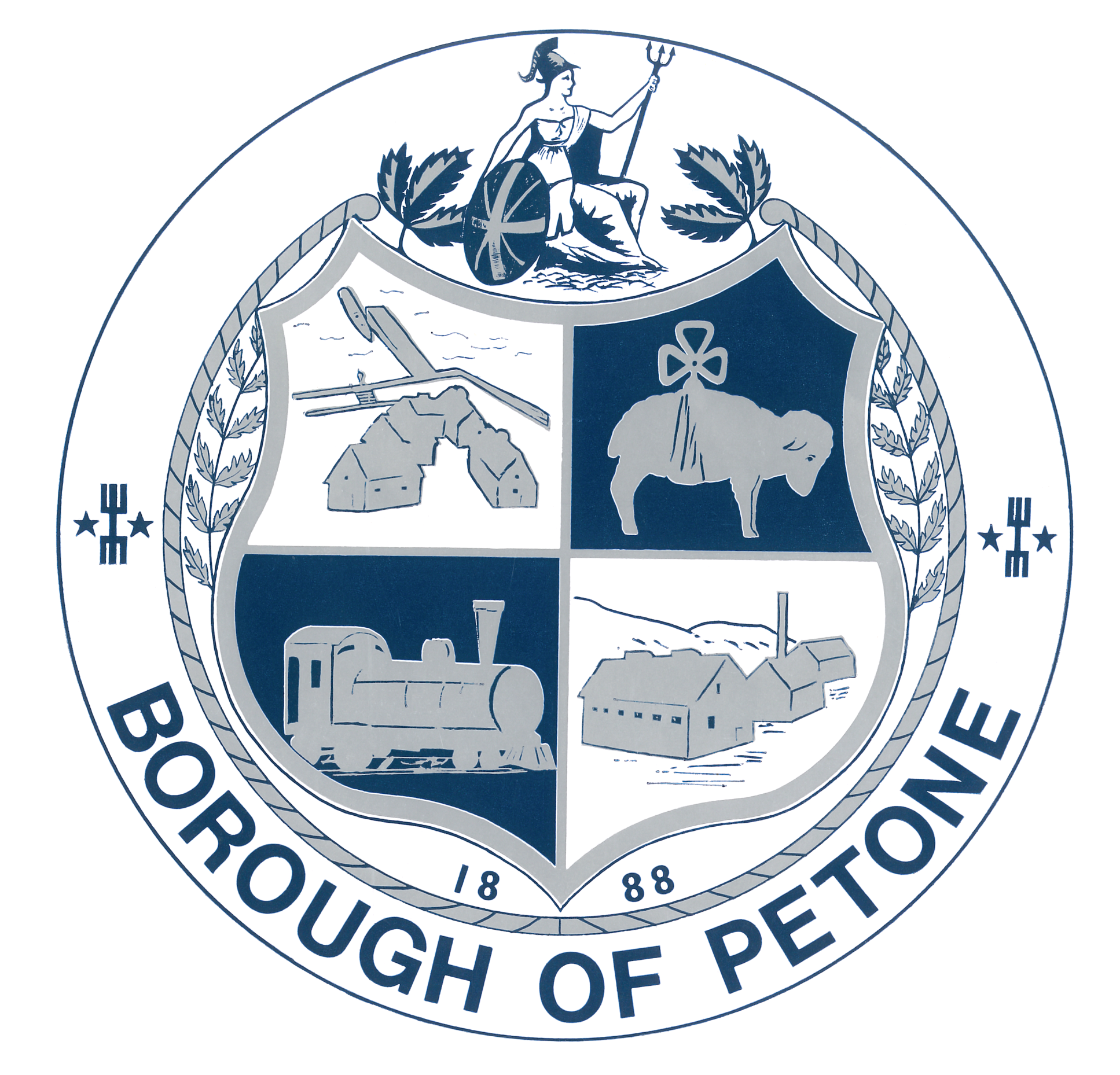
- Coat of arms of the Borough of Petone
- Style: His/Her Worship
- Term length: Three years, renewable
- Inaugural holder: William James Kirk
- Formation: 9 December 1882
- Final holder: Ted Woolf
- Abolished: 14 October 1989
- Superseded by: Mayor of Lower Hutt

The Mayor of Petone officiated over the Petone Borough of New Zealand, which was administered by the Petone Borough Council. The office existed from 1882 until 1989, when Petone Borough was amalgamated into the Hutt City Council as part of the 1989 local government reforms. There were seventeen holders of the office.

== History ==
Petone was established in 1882 with a Town Board which was presided over by a chairman who was the equivalent of a mayor but was elected by the board members rather than the public. When Petone was proclaimed a borough in 1888 The chairman of the Town Board did the duties of the mayor until an election was held for the mayoralty in July ahead of the scheduled election in November. Samuel Raymond Johnson was the first elected mayor.

There were two sets of mayors who were related. George Thomas London and his son, George, were both mayors. Likewise Joseph Mitchell and Lily Annie Huggan were spouses. When Joe died in 1957 his wife won the by-election to replace him as mayor. In 1968, George Gee, a Chinese-New Zealand greengrocer, was elected the mayor of Petone, the first Asian mayor in New Zealand history.

Upon amalgamation into the Hutt City Council, Petone's last mayor, Ted Woolf, stood for Mayor of Lower Hutt in 1989. He was unsuccessful but was elected a councillor for the new Harbour Ward.

== List of mayors ==
Mayors of Petone were:

Key

Independent	Labour	Citizens'	United Petone

†: Died in office

#	Name	Portrait	Term of office	
1	William James Kirk		9 December 1882	31 July 1888
2	Samuel Raymond Johnson		31 July 1888	18 December 1889
3	Richard Clement Kirk		18 December 1889	16 December 1891
4	Richard Mothes		16 December 1891	13 December 1892
(3)	Richard Clement Kirk		13 December 1892	14 May 1901
(4)	Richard Mothes		14 May 1901	22 May 1903
5	George Thomas London		22 May 1903	1 May 1907
6	John William McEwan		1 May 1907	4 May 1927
7	David McKenzie		4 May 1927	2 October 1934†
8	Albert Scholefield		8 October 1934	18 May 1938
9	George London		18 May 1938	1 June 1944
10	Harold Green		1 June 1944	19 November 1947
11	Alec MacFarlane		19 November 1947	18 November 1950
12	Joe Huggan		18 November 1950	6 September 1957†
-	James Cumming (Acting Mayor)		6 September 1957	1 October 1957
13	Annie Huggan		1 October 1957	9 October 1965
14	Ralph Love		9 October 1965	27 January 1967
-	Joe May (Acting Mayor)		27 January 1967	26 March 1967
(14)	Ralph Love		26 March 1967	12 October 1968
15	George Gee		12 October 1968	28 October 1980
16	Ron Marston		28 October 1980	11 October 1986
17	Ted Woolf		11 October 1986	14 October 1989

== See also ==
- Mayoral elections in Petone
