= Galaxiella toourtkoourt =

Scientific classification
- Domain: Eukaryota
- Kingdom: Animalia
- Phylum: Chordata
- Class: Actinopterygii
- Order: Galaxiiformes
- Family: Galaxiidae
- Genus: Galaxiella
- Species: G. toourtkoourt

Binomial name
- Galaxiella toourtkoourt Coleman & Raadik, 2015
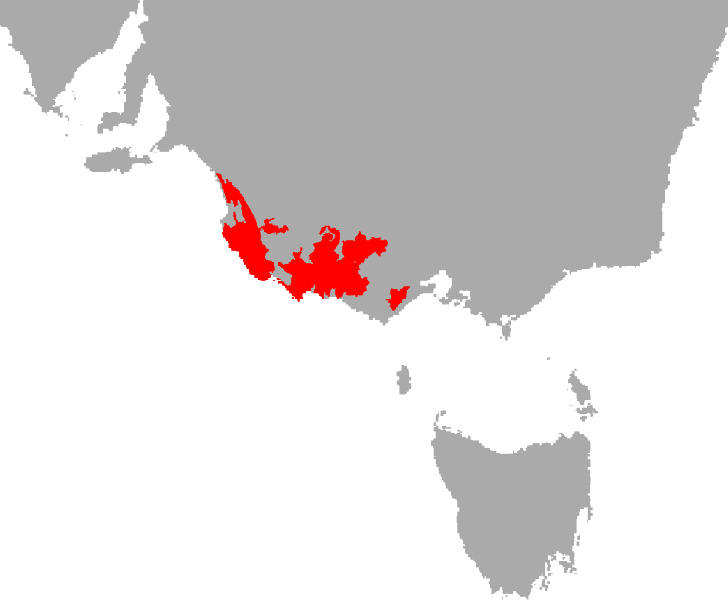

Species of fish

Galaxiella toourtkoourt, known as the little galaxias (although it is not a true member of the genus Galaxias), is a species of fish in the family Galaxiidae. It is among the smallest galaxiid species known.

It is a freshwater fish native to Australia, where it ranges from the Barwon River basin near Barwon Downs in Victoria west to the Watervalley Wetlands near Coorong National Park in South Australia. It is typically seen in swamps, wetlands, billabongs, shallow lakes, small streams, and artificial drainage systems in water less than 2 m (6.6 ft) deep and at elevations of between 22 and 176 m (72 and 577 ft) above sea level. The environments in which the species occurs are usually characterized by still or slow-flowing water and partial shade, and they may occasionally be slightly saline.

Water quality measurements indicate that Galaxiella toourtkoourt is tolerant of a wide range of water conditions, with individuals inhabiting areas with a temperature between 5.2 and 26.9 °C (41.4 and 80.4 °F), a dissolved oxygen level of 20% to 263% saturation, a pH of 5.3 to 9.3, a conductivity of 94 to 13,620 μS/cm, and a turbidity of 1 to 96 NTU. It is often seen alongside other native fish species such as Nannoperca australis and Galaxias maculatus, crayfish belonging to the genera Engaeus and Geocharax, and the introduced eastern mosquitofish. Galaxiella toourtkoourt is a small fish, reaching 4.2 cm (1.7 in) in total length.

Galaxiella toourtkoourt was described in 2015 by Rhys A. Coleman, Ary A. Hoffmann, and Tarmo A. Raadik based on distinct genetic and morphological characteristics that differentiate the species from its relative Galaxiella pusilla. Its specific epithet, toourtkoourt, is derived from indigenous languages such as the Djabwurrung language and reportedly means "little fish in freshwater".
