= Ruth Mason =

New Zealand botanist

- Born: 7 November 1913; Auckland
- Died: 14 May 1990 (aged 76); Christchurch Hospital
- Alma mater: University of Auckland; St Cuthbert's College
- Occupation: Botanist; botanical collector; scientific collector
- Parent(s): Rex Mason
- Awards: life member (New Zealand Ecological Society)
- Academic career
- Institutions: Department of Scientific and Industrial Research
- Author abbrev. (botany): R.Mason

Ruth Mason (7 November 1913 – 14 May 1990) was a New Zealand botanist specialising in the taxonomy and ecology of freshwater plants. She was employed at the Department of Scientific and Industrial Research for 35 years undertaking research into aquatic plants, pioneering new techniques for plant preservation and collecting over 13,000 plant specimens in the field. She was awarded life membership by the New Zealand Ecological Society.

== Early life and education ==
Mason was born in Auckland, New Zealand, in 1913. She attended St Cuthbert's College until 1931 and was Dux. She was educated at the University of Auckland (then known as Auckland University College, part of the University of New Zealand) where she completed a Bachelor of Arts in Pure Mathematics in 1934 and a Bachelor of Science in Botany and Applied Mathematics in 1935.

She went on to complete a Master of Science in botany in 1937. Mason's MSc thesis is entitled, "Some observations on Griselinia lucida (Forst.)", in which she studied the morphology, anatomy and ecology of this epiphytic species of native New Zealand tree, including anatomical comparison of the roots of the developing epiphyte and stem.

While at university, she was a member of the Auckland University College Field Club.

== Professional life ==
In 1939, Mason was appointed to the Department of Scientific and Industrial Research (DSIR) as an assistant botanist. She joined her colleague, supervisor, and fellow botanist Lucy Moore, who had started at DSIR the previous year. Some of the first projects she worked on included establishing a seed herbarium (together with Margaret J.A. Simpson) and, contributing to the war effort for the Second World War, researching fibre quality in linen flax grown on different soil types. Other early research projects focused on investigating the seeds and other plant material in the gizzards of several herbivores that were introduced to New Zealand, such as birds, possums and deer, as well as the extinct New Zealand endemic moa, to determine their food preferences. Mason was one of the botanists on the 1949 New Zealand American Fiordland Expedition, and was the only woman participant of the 49 official members of the expedition.

Mason is best known for her research on the taxonomy and ecology of aquatic plants, which included genera from a range of plant families, such as Typha (bulrush or raupō), Callitriche (starwort), and Ruppia (horse's mane). In 1949, Mason was the first to record Wolffia (duckweed) in New Zealand, which is an aquatic plant and one of the smallest flowering plants in the world. Her most long-standing research interest was in the freshwater algae commonly known as stoneworts. Her research and collections have made major contributions to our understanding of the taxonomy, ecology and distribution of aquatic plants in New Zealand and throughout the world.

Ruth Mason worked at DSIR for 35 years until her retirement in 1974. Over the course of her career, she initiated and developed the study of plant anatomy at DSIR. Due to her extensive fieldwork, Mason pioneered new techniques for plant preservation in the field, and collected over 13,000 specimens, many of which are housed at the Allan Herbarium at Manaaki Whenua - Landcare Research, Lincoln. Mason's specimens were important to those working on aquatic plants in New Zealand and internationally, including her colleagues working on the series of volumes of the Flora of New Zealand.

Mason was also a founding member of the Canterbury Botanical Society, the New Zealand Limnological Society and the New Zealand Ecological Society.

== Honours and awards ==
In 2017, Mason was selected as one of the Royal Society Te Apārangi's "150 women in 150 words", celebrating the contributions of women to knowledge in New Zealand. She is one of only two women who have been conferred life membership by the New Zealand Ecological Society.

== Eponymy ==
Several species of plants and at least one fungus have been named in honour of Ruth Mason.

- Colobanthus masoniae L.B.Moore, an endemic New Zealand cushion-like pearlwort.
- Hebe pauciramosa var. masoniae L.B.Moore (now Veronica masoniae (L.B.Moore) Garn.-Jones), an endemic New Zealand hebe, "named in honour of Miss Ruth Mason who has collected widely in the Nelson district and there recognized some of the peculiar features of this plant."
- Lilaeopsis ruthiana Affolter, a small, aquatic flowering plant endemic to New Zealand, "named after Ruth Mason, who has long been a student of the New Zealand aquatic flora."
- Laccaria masoniae G.Stev., an endemic species of New Zealand fungi.

== Family and personal life ==
Ruth Mason's father was Rex Mason (1885–1975), a New Zealand politician who served in many ministerial roles and was in parliament from 1926 to 1966. Her mother was Dulcia Martina Mason née Rockell (1883–1971). She had three younger siblings, and never married. Mason was an avid tramper and was active in the Tararua Tramping Club and Wellington Botanical Society prior to moving to the South Island in 1954, where she lived in Prebbleton (near Christchurch, New Zealand) for almost three decades. In addition to botany and the outdoors, Mason had wide-ranging interests throughout her life in music, lexicography, history, yoga and working for UNICEF.

== Death ==
Mason died in Christchurch at Christchurch Hospital in 1990.

== Taxon names authored ==
Ruth Mason named seven species in four different genera of plants.

- Callitriche aucklandica R.Mason
- Callitriche capricorni R.Mason
- Callitriche petriei R.Mason
- Coprosma talbrockiei L.B.Moore & R.Mason
- Nertera villosa B.H.Macmill. & R.Mason
- Ruppia megacarpa R.Mason
- Ruppia polycarpa R.Mason

== Selected works ==
- R. Mason (1948). "Station Records of Indigenous Plants" (PDF). Transactions and Proceedings of the Royal Society of New Zealand. 77: 175–180. ISSN 1176-6166. Wikidata Q89183073.
- Mason, Ruth; Moar, Neville T.; Cooper, Robert (1950). "New Plant Localities in the Auckland Province". Records of the Auckland Institute and Museum. 4: 83–92. ISSN 0067-0464. JSTOR 42906045. Wikidata Q58676708.
- R. Mason; N. T. Moar (1951). "Typha in New Zealand" (PDF). Wellington Botanical Society Bulletin. 24: 6–9. ISSN 0110-6708. Wikidata Q114496009.
- R. Mason (1959). "Callitriche in New Zealand and Australia". Australian Journal of Botany. 7 (3): 295. doi:10.1071/BT9590295. ISSN 0067-1924. Wikidata Q55756136.
- Ruth Mason (1960). "Three waterweeds of the family Hydrocharitaceae in New Zealand". New Zealand Journal of Science. 3 (3): 382–395. ISSN 0028-8365. Wikidata Q114554403.
- R. Mason (July 1961). "Dispersal of Tropical Seeds by Ocean Currents". Nature. 191 (4786): 408–409. doi:10.1038/191408A0. ISSN 1476-4687. Wikidata Q59072837.
- R. Mason (1967). "The species of Ruppia in New Zealand". New Zealand Journal of Botany. 5 (4): 519–531. doi:10.1080/0028825X.1967.10428771. ISSN 0028-825X. Wikidata Q114468415.
- R.D. Wood; R. Mason (March 1977). "Characeae of New Zealand". New Zealand Journal of Botany. 15 (1): 87–180. doi:10.1080/0028825X.1977.10429619. ISSN 0028-825X. Wikidata Q114554670.
- M.J.A. Simpson; R. Mason (1984). "The flora of the Canterbury dune system (New Brighton - Waipara) in the 1980's". New Zealand Natural Sciences. 11. doi:10.26021/349. ISSN 0113-7492. Wikidata Q97665384.
