= Adra, Spain =

Adra
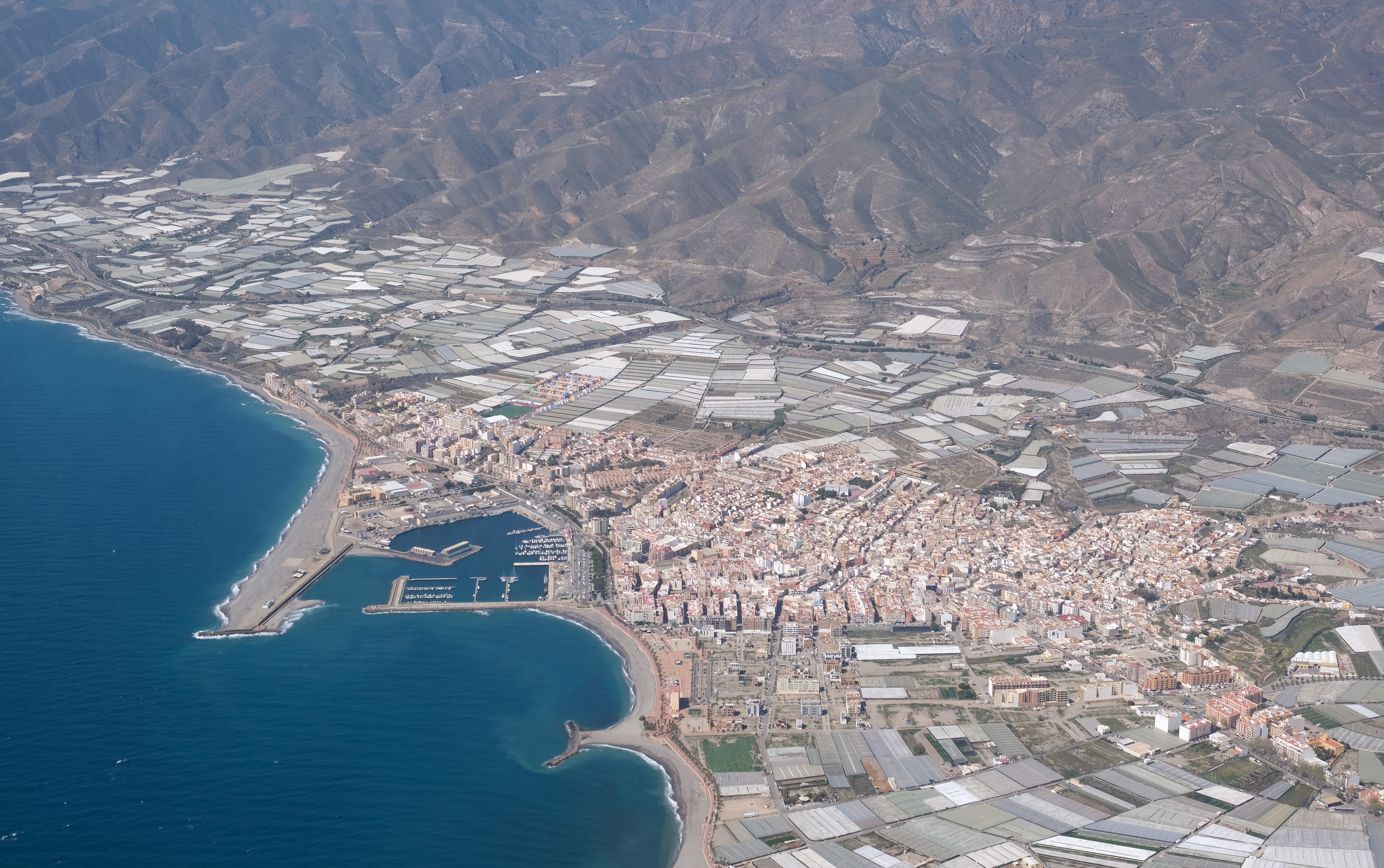

- Flag Coat of arms

- Location of Adra Adra (Andalusia) Adra (Spain)
- Coordinates: 36°44′52″N 3°0′58″W
- Country: Spain
- Community: Andalusia
- Province: Almería
- Comarca: Poniente Almeriense
- Municipality: Adra

Government
  - Mayor (2015– ): Manuel Cortés Pérez (PPA)

Area
  - Total: 90.05 km^{2} (34.77 sq mi)
- Elevation: 20 m (66 ft)

Population (2025-01-01)
  - Total: 25,501
  - Density: 283.2/km^{2} (733.5/sq mi)
- Demonym: Abderitano
- Time zone: UTC+1 (CET)
  - Summer (DST): UTC+2 (CEST)
- Website: adra.es

Adra, the classical Abdera, is a municipality of Almería province, Spain.

== History ==
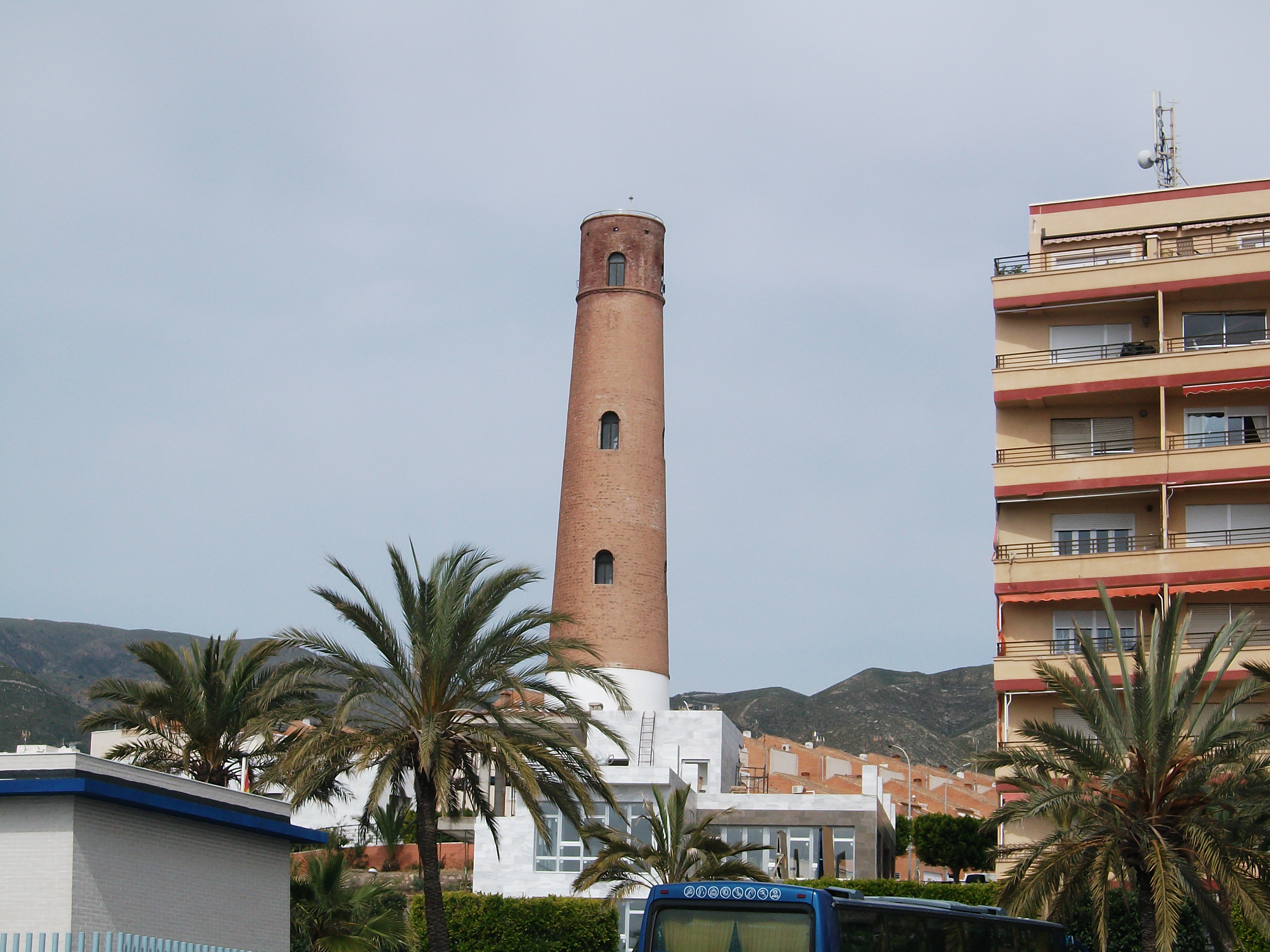
City Centre, March 2011

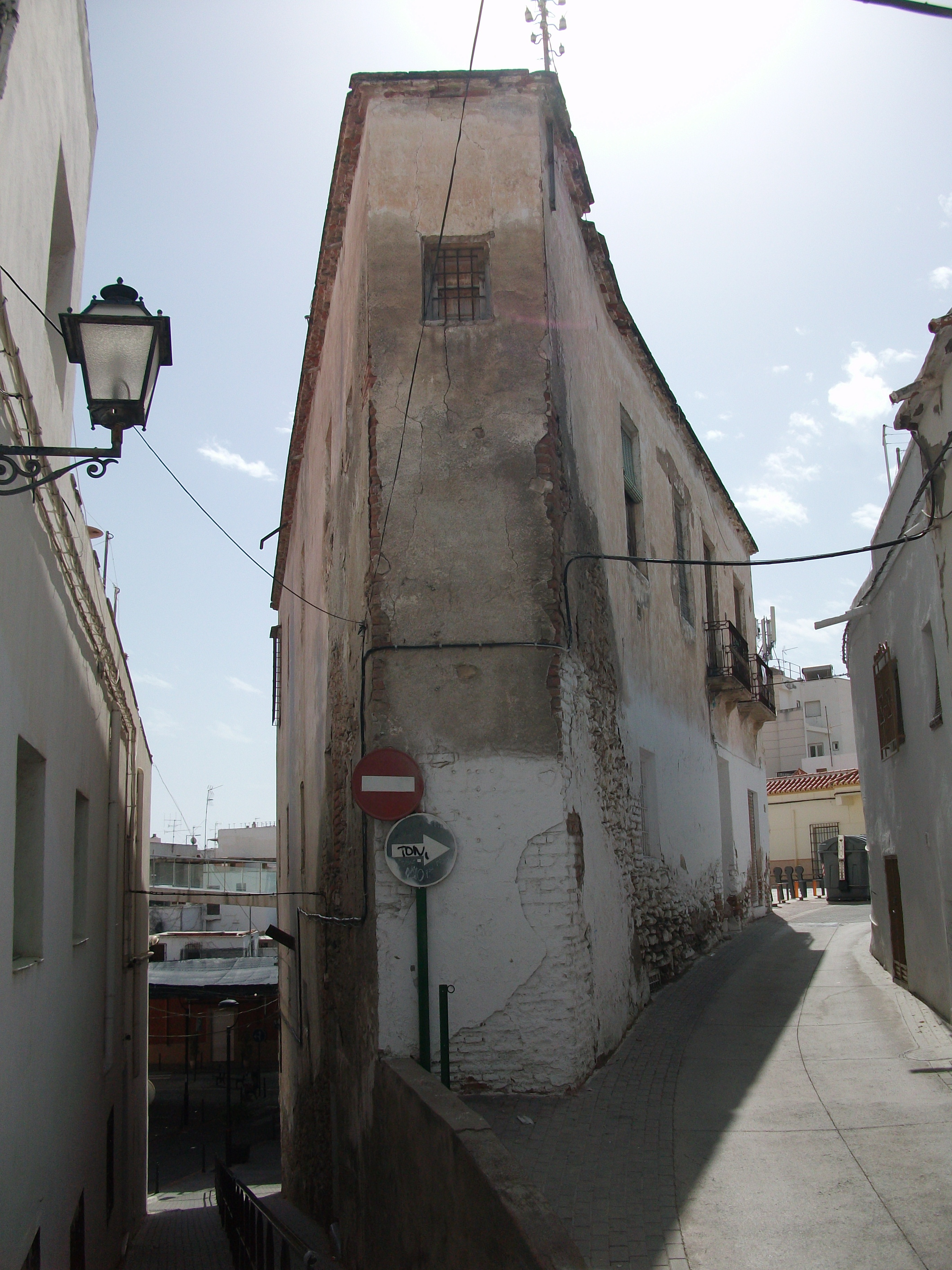
Typical street in Adra, March 2011

Abdera was founded by the Phoenicians as a trading colony. It later grew to prominence under the Roman Empire.

Adra was the last stronghold of the Moors in Spain. In January 1492 it was here that the forces of Boabdil were defeated ending the power of the Moors in Spain.

In the 16th century defensive walls were built to protect the settlement. These partially survive.

== Demographics ==
Adra had a population of 25,412 inhabitants in 2020 (according to the municipal census published by the National Institute of Statistics).

The percentage of foreign born residents was 5.2% in 2005. The majority of these residents originated from Morocco, making up 49% of the total.

The percentage of people living in the urban centre of Adra has been slowly increasing. In 2017 it represented 80% of the total municipal population.

Historical population
| Year | Pop. | ±% |
|---|---|---|
| 1999 | 21,286 | — |
| 2000 | 21,505 | +1.0% |
| 2001 | 21,810 | +1.4% |
| 2002 | 22,034 | +1.0% |
| 2003 | 21,704 | −1.5% |
| 2004 | 22,257 | +2.5% |
| 2005 | 23,195 | +4.2% |
| 2006 | 23,545 | +1.5% |
| 2007 | 23,742 | +0.8% |
| 2008 | 23,880 | +0.6% |
| 2009 | 24,373 | +2.1% |
| 2010 | 24,512 | +0.6% |
| 2011 | 24,512 | +0.0% |
| 2012 | 24,626 | +0.5% |
| 2013 | 24,761 | +0.5% |
| 2014 | 24,782 | +0.1% |
| 2015 | 24,670 | −0.5% |
| 2016 | 24,713 | +0.2% |
| 2017 | 24,697 | −0.1% |
| 2018 | 24,859 | +0.7% |
| 2019 | 25,148 | +1.2% |
| 2020 | 25,412 | +1.0% |

== Culture in Adra ==
Adra Museum: Visitors can spend their free time in the three exhibition halls of the museum, which show the cultural legacy of the Phoenician, Punic and Roman civilizations, and which educate and entertain at the same time. Important exhibitions of national prestige are periodically held here with success. The museum has a shop where archaeological reproductions can be bought. A nearby mill, El Molino del Lugar, built around 1814 and recently renovated, is the site of the ethnographic section of the museum.

The Fair: Adra's fair is considered to be the second most important in the province of Almería and the population of Adra and countless visitors gather between September 5 and 10. The patron saint is la Virgen del Mar, who is taken out in a procession on September 8, while San Nicolás de Tolentino is celebrated on the 10th with a procession through el Barrio, the old town.

April 25 is the day of San Marcos and is important to the farmers of Adra. It is an official festival of tourist interest in Andalucía.

July 16 is the day of Our Lady of Mount Carmel, the patron saint of fishermen. A procession takes place by boat.

Bazaars take place two Saturdays a month in a carpark which is beside the Sports Center and I.E.S Abdera School.

Adra had a successful regional level football club, C.F. Adra, which is now defunct.

== People ==
- Carmen Crespo, Spanish politician from Popular Party
- Rafael Gómez Nieto, Spanish soldier
- Juan Luis Riado, footballer
- Álvaro Santiago (footballer)
- Ismael Torres, Argentine cyclist
- La Veneno, Spanish singer, actress, sex worker, vedette and media personality. Considered one of the more important LGBT icons in Spain

== Albufera de Adra ==
The Albufera de Adra is a wetland site. It is on the Ramsar list of Wetlands of International Importance. Although it is protected as a nature reserve, the surrounding land is used for intensive agriculture.

== See also ==
- List of municipalities in Almería
