= Dzieduszyckia =

Dzieduszyckia is the scientific name of two genera of organisms and may refer to:

- Dzieduszyckia (brachiopod), a genus of brachiopods
- Dzieduszyckia (plant), a genus of plants currently considered to be a synonym of Ruppia
