= Admixture =

Admixture may refer to:

- Genetic admixture, the result of interbreeding between two or more previously isolated populations within a species
- Racial admixture, admixture between humans, also referred to as miscegenation
- Hybrid
- Mixture, the chemical substance which results when two different materials are combined without occurrence of chemical reactions
- Admixture (concrete), the chemicals used to aid the properties of concrete or cement
