= Galaxiella =

Scientific classification
- Kingdom: Animalia
- Phylum: Chordata
- Class: Actinopterygii
- Order: Galaxiiformes
- Family: Galaxiidae
- Subfamily: Galaxiinae
- Genus: Galaxiella; McDowall, 1978
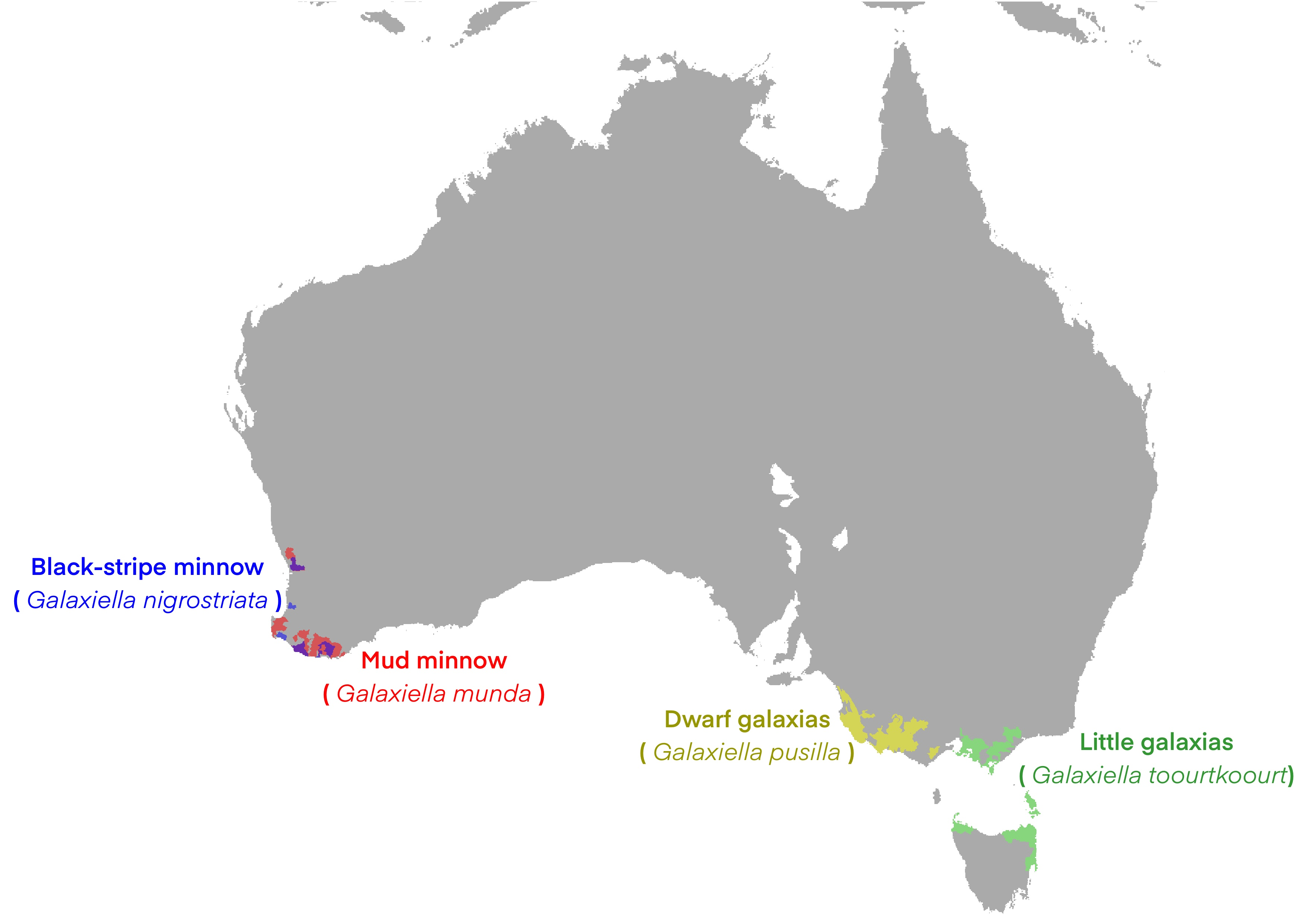

Genus of ray-finned fishes

Galaxiella is a genus of Australian ray-finned fish of the family Galaxiidae.

== Species ==
There are currently 4 recognized species in this genus:

- Galaxiella munda McDowall, 1978 (Mud minnow)
- Galaxiella nigrostriata (Shipway, 1953) (Black-stripe minnow)
- Galaxiella pusilla (Mack, 1936) (Dwarf galaxias)
- Galaxiella toourtkoourt R. A. Coleman & Raadik, 2015 (Little galaxias)
