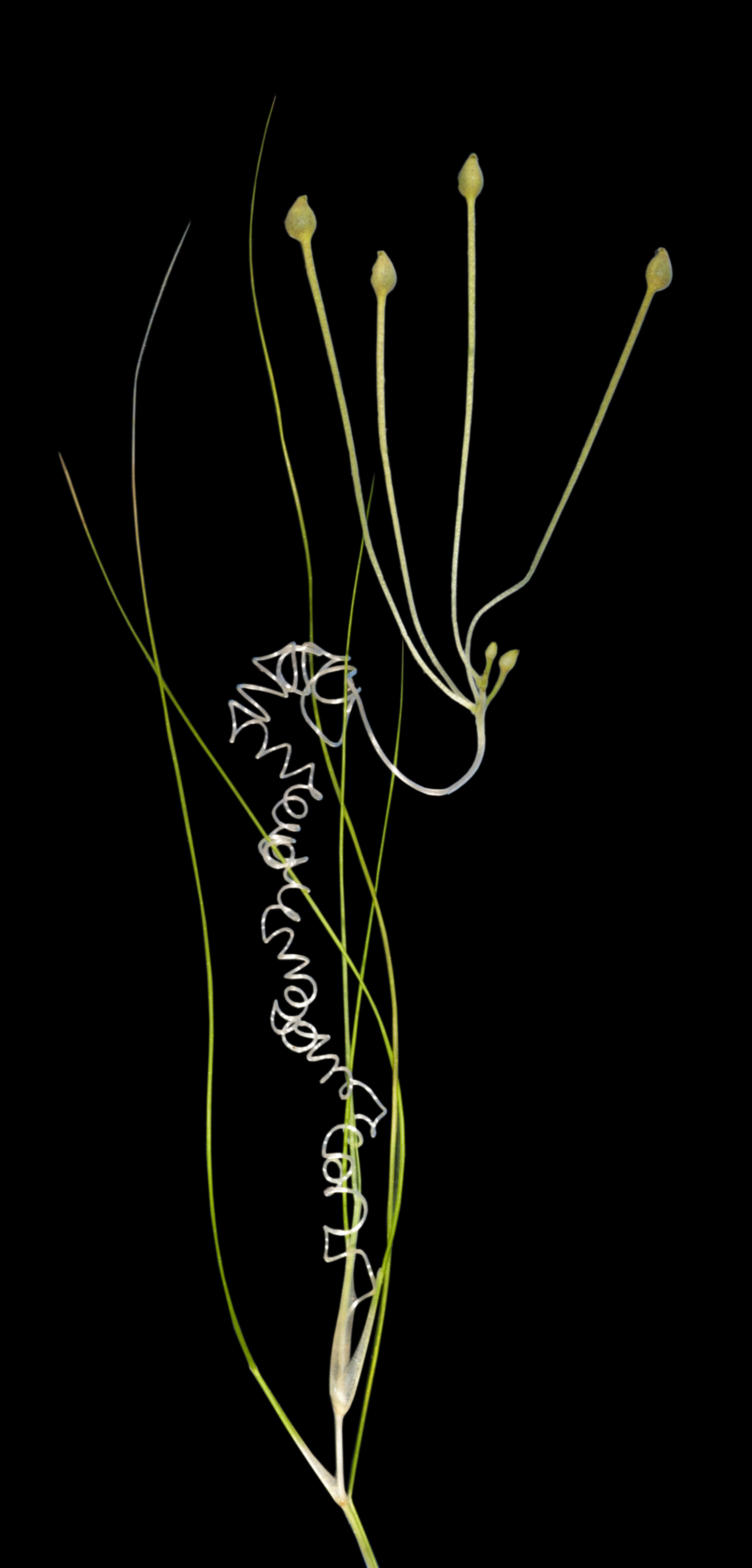

Scientific classification
- Kingdom: Plantae
- Clade: Tracheophytes
- Clade: Angiosperms
- Clade: Monocots
- Order: Alismatales
- Family: Ruppiaceae
- Genus: Ruppia
- Species: R. polycarpa

Binomial name
- Ruppia polycarpa R.Mason

= Ruppia polycarpa =

Species of aquatic plant

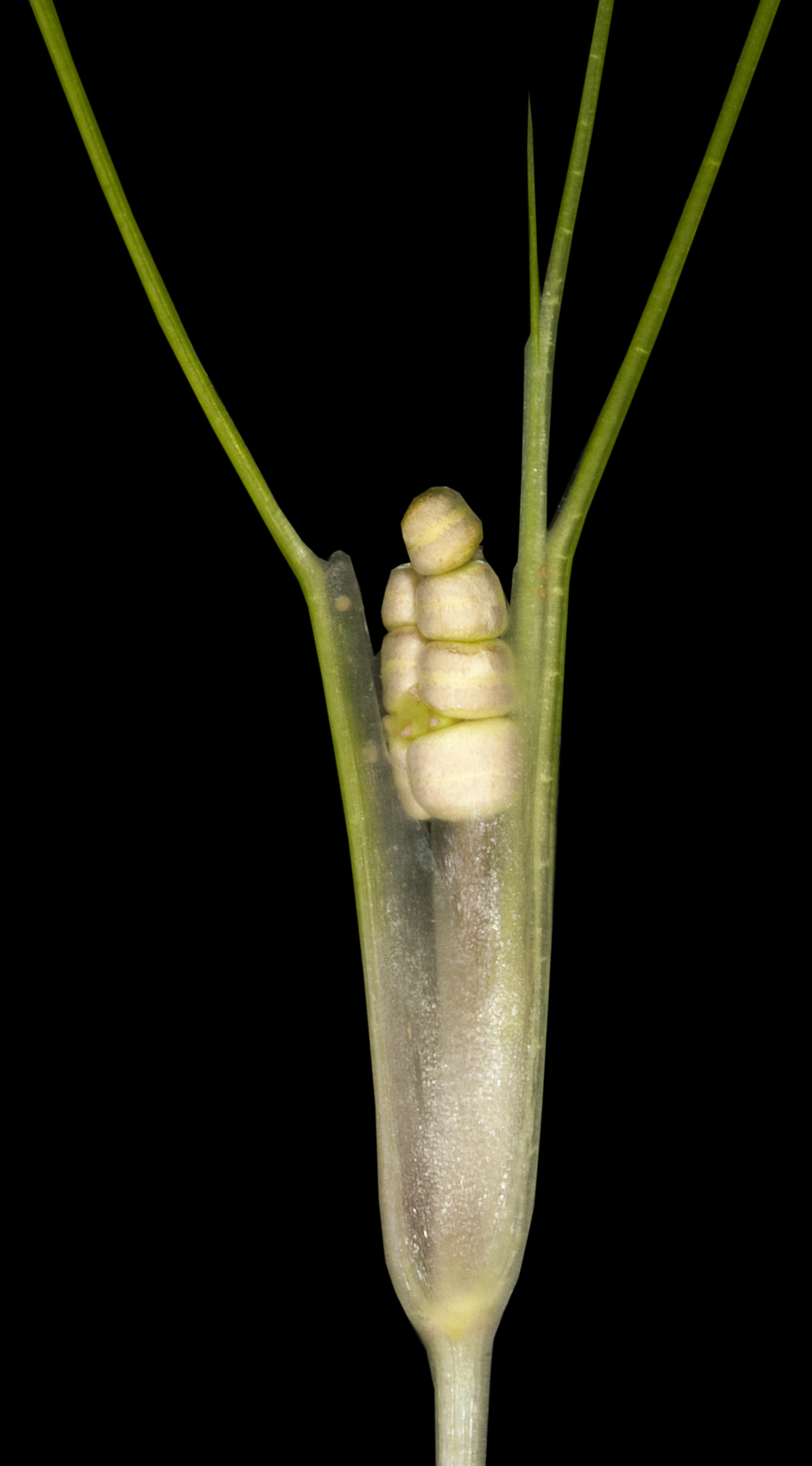
Ruppia polycarpa

Ruppia polycarpa is a submerged aquatic herb species in the genus Ruppia found in shallow brackish waters. It is a common submerged herb on Australasian coasts, including Australia (NSW; SA; Vic; WA) and New Zealand (type locality).

It was first described in 1967 by Ruth Mason from a specimen (CHR 150837B) found near the mouth of the Selwyn River, New Zealand, on the riverbed, on 27 February 1966 by J. Clarke.

It grows in "fresh to hypersaline coastal lakes, lagoons and estuaries".
