= New Zealand American Fiordland Expedition =

American Research Expedition in New Zealand

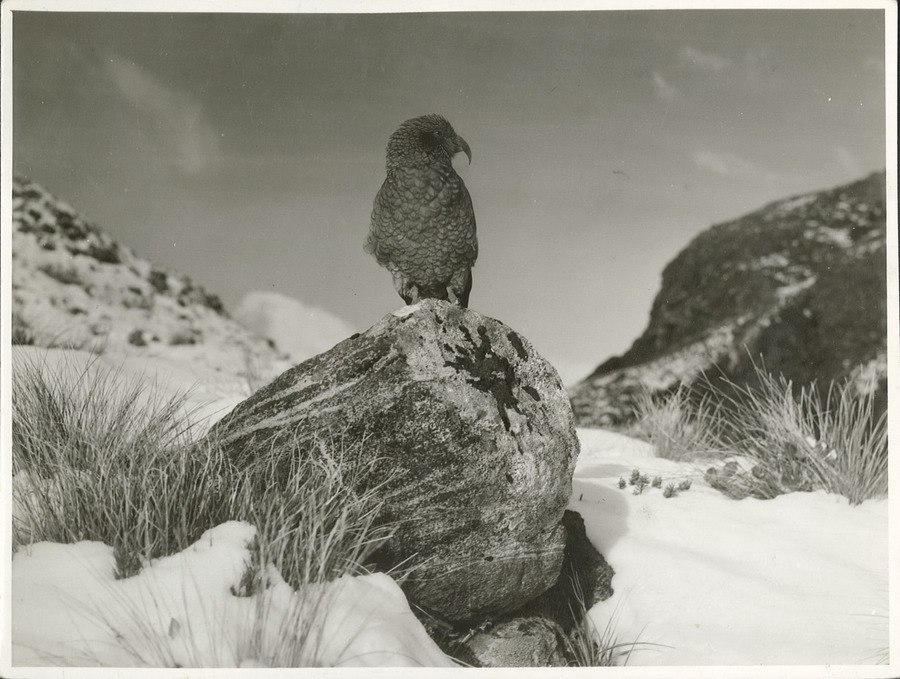
- Country: New Zealand
- Location: Fiordland National Park; Fiordland
- Country of origin: New Zealand; United States
- Start: 9 January 1949
- End: May 1949
- Leader: Olaus Murie
- Sponsor: Department of Internal Affairs
- Funder: New Zealand Government
- Vessels: MV Alert
- Participants: John K. Howard; Olaus Murie; Lindsay Poole; Hunter Baughan Wisely; Charles Lindsay; Lionel Jack Dumbleton; Jim Ollerenshaw; Kenneth Bigwood; Frank E. Barlow; Ruth Mason; Jack Henry; David Alexander Brown; Holmes Miller; Alexander Black

The New Zealand American Fiordland Expedition was a research expedition organised by the Department of Internal Affairs in 1949 to undertake research into elk (wapiti) as well as other biodiversity, surveying and geology in the Fiordland National Park.

== Genesis of the expedition ==
In 1947, American Colonel John K. Howard participated in a preliminary reconnaissance survey of Fiordland, South Island, New Zealand for elk (wapiti). Wapiti are not native to New Zealand; they were introduced in 1905 from the United States into Fiordland National Park. After that study, Howard was interested in organising a comparative scientific study of wapiti and their habitat in their native United States and their established range in Fiordland.

Fiordland is well-known for its isolation, steep mountainous terrain, and notoriously bad weather, so such an expedition would need good communication, several camps, a large and experienced team, and the support of several governmental departments. Howard first recruited the American expert on wapiti, Olaus Murie, to be scientific leader, and then set up a management committee to plan the expedition into Fiordland to study wapiti. The expedition was funded by a grant in 1948 from the New Zealand Cabinet to the Department of Internal Affairs, which called it The New Zealand-American Fiordland Expedition.

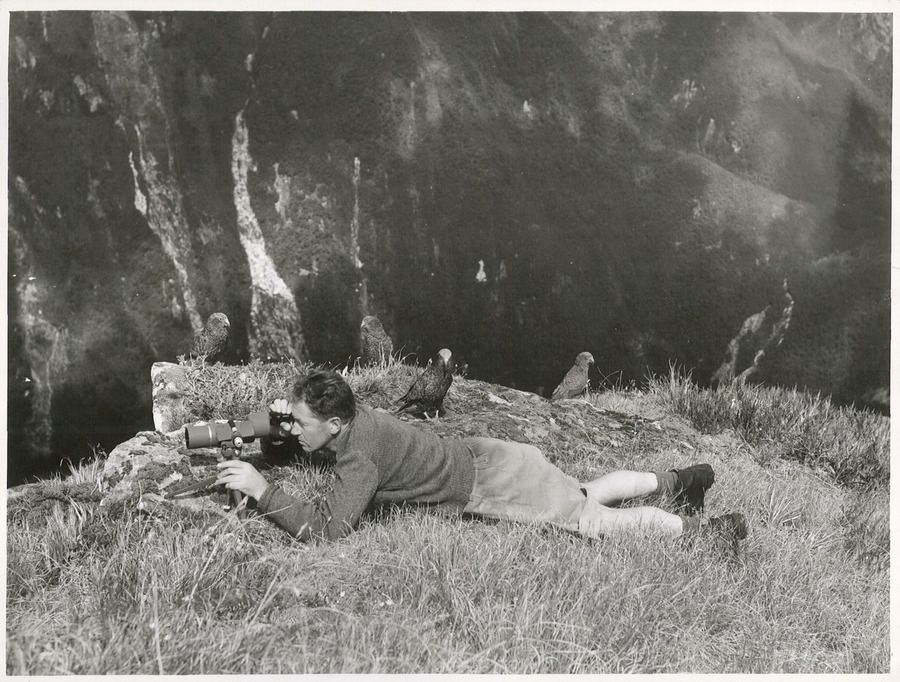
One of the expedition scientists photographed with kea by expedition photographer Kenneth Bigwood in March 1949

The main aim of the expedition was to study the wapiti population in its breeding grounds in Fiordland. However scientists from other fields of study would also study other aspects of zoology, botany, geology, forest survey, survey and photography.

== Participants ==
In addition to three American scientists, the vast majority of members of the large interdisciplinary team included New Zealand scientists, photographers, surveyors, and field personnel. Forty-nine people are listed as being "official personnel" on the expedition, but more than 60 took part in it. Only one of the 49 official participants was a woman, the New Zealand botanist, Ruth Mason.

=== Leaders ===
- John K. Howard, American Colonel, instigator of the expedition and zoologist (deer)
- Olaus Murie, American, Director of The Wilderness Society, scientific leader and zoologist (wapiti)
- Donald Murie, American, son of and assistant to Olaus Murie; 17 years old at the time of the expedition
- Lindsay Poole, DSIR, deputy scientific leader and botanist

=== Biologists ===
- Ralph Irvine Kean, Department of Internal Affairs, biologist
- Hunter Baughan Wisely, Department of Internal Affairs, biologist (deer)
- Frank Woodrow, Canadian-born trapper, Department of Internal Affairs, biologist (small mammals)
- Kazimierz Wodzicki, DSIR, zoologist (small mammals)
- Peter Creswick Bull, DSIR zoologist (small mammals)
- Brian Turnbull Cunningham, Marine Department, biologist (fish)
- D. J. Anderson, Marine Department, biologist (fish)
- Lionel Jack Dumbleton, DSIR, entomologist
- Richard Dell, Dominion Museum, invertebrate zoologist
- Ray Forster, Canterbury Museum, invertebrate zoologist
- Charles John Lindsay, Dominion Museum, preparator and taxidermist
- W. R. B. Oliver, Dominion Museum, botanist
- Ruth Mason, DSIR, botanist
- Victor Zotov, DSIR, botanist
- John Thorpe Holloway, New Zealand Forest Service, forest survey leader
- Jack Henry, New Zealand Forest Service, forest survey
- J. Everett, New Zealand Forest Service, forest survey
- David Alexander Brown, DSIR and New Zealand Geological Survey, geologist
- Alan Copland Beck, DSIR, geologist

=== Surveyors ===
- Joseph Holmes Miller, Department of Lands and Survey, surveyor and survey leader
- Robert Douglas Dick, Department of Lands and Survey, surveyor
- Ralph Moir, Department of Lands and Survey, surveyor
- R. Litt, Department of Lands and Survey, surveyor

=== Photographers ===
- Kenneth Valentine Bigwood, Prime Minister's Department, photographer
- Jim Ollerenshaw, Department of Internal Affairs, photographer

=== Field personnel ===
- R. V. McKane, field leader
- Kenneth Miers, deputy field leader
- D. Le Beau, shooter
- D. Jenkins, shooter
- R. C. Borlase, cook
- Max R. Farrell, NZRAMC medical sergeant, medical officer
- Frank E. Barlow, wireless operator
- J. Lutterell, assistant to John K. Howard
- R. Dunstan, service personnel
- W. R. Drower, service personnel
- W. Gardiner, service personnel
- J. Cornish, service personnel
- H. Dixon, service personnel
- M. Logan, service personnel
- A. F. Allen, service personnel
- C. Templeton, service personnel
- R. Ensor, service personnel
- V. R. Woods, service personnel
- G. H. Ross, service personnel
- G. Sharpe, service personnel

=== Others mentioned in the preliminary reports or elsewhere but not on list of official personnel ===
- Alexander J. Black, captain of MV Alert
- E. J. Herrick, experienced wapiti stalker
- Kenneth Sutherland, experienced wapiti stalker
- Leslie Murrell
- Robert Falla, Director of the Dominion Museum

== Expedition ==
In early January 1949, Howard and the team of field personnel sailed on the MV Alert with most of the expedition gear from Bluff and Milford to a small camp that they set up at Caswell Sound. They prepared for the arrival of the scientific teams by unloading and packing stores and equipment, establishing camps, and cutting tracks for the rest of the expedition party.

The base camp for the expedition was established on the banks of the Stillwater River, about 6 miles from the small beachhead camp at Caswell Sound, which had storage tents, a laboratory, a cookhouse, a wireless, and even electric lighting. The field party hauled stores and equipment by land to Lake Marchant, and from there, prams with outboard motors were used to ship the gear to base camp. Other smaller camps were established on the Stillwater River (two camps), Leslie Clearing (one), Glaisnock River (two), and Henry Saddle (one); the expedition also used several Ministry of Works' huts, including at George Sound, Lake Thomson and Lake Hankinson.

Even though wapiti animals would be shot to make specimens of them, the expedition team only ate wapiti meat about six times, when a specimen happened to be shot near camp. Additional camp stores therefore had to be replenished regularly. For the duration of the expedition from January through May 1949, stores were shipped via road from Invercargill using New Zealand Army trucks that transported them through the partially completed Homer Tunnel to Milford. From there, Alexander J. Black, captain of MV Alert, ran fortnightly trips by sea between Milford and the expedition's two main beachhead landing sites in Fiordland: Caswell Sound and George Sound.

In early March, the expedition was also supplied by air drops from Queenstown to the upper Stillwater River camp. For example on 5 March, packages weighing c. 35 pounds were dropped by parachute from aircraft, one package on each of five trips. Some of the special supplies in each package that went above and beyond standard camp food included asparagus, coffee and Worcester sauce. The main dates of the expedition were as follows:

- 9 January 1949: The field party, Howard, photographer and survey party travelled from Bluff and Milford to Caswell Sound.
- 29 January 1949: The field party shifted stores from Milford to Caswell Sound.
- 12 February 1949: The field party shifted stores from Milford to Caswell Sound.
- 26 February 1949: The scientific teams (including Murie, zoologists, botanists (including Poole), entomologists and Lindsay, the preparator) arrived and began research around base camp, and smaller camps on the Stillwater River and Leslie Clearing. These scientists spent about 6 weeks in this area, visiting Mary Peaks (1 day), Leslie Clearing (5 days), Upper Stillwater Camp (10 days), Saddle Hill (1 day), George Sound (2 days), Henry Saddle (2 days) and Hankinson Hut (2 days), with the remaining days at base camp.
- 26 March 1949: Botanists Oliver and Zotov, together with Wodzicki and the forest surveyors, travelled from Dunedin to Caswell Sound.
- 26 March to 5 April 2024: The botanists collected vascular plants and bryophytes for the Dominion Museum around Caswell Sound, base camp, Leslie Clearing, and George Sound.
- 7 April 1949: The expedition moved to George Sound, also travelling to Hankinson Hut via Henry Saddle. Robert Falla was expected to arrive at the upper Stillwater camp for a brief stay.
- 6-26 April 1949: Botanist Mason collected aquatic plants and identified plants eaten by wapiti, while the forest survey was also conducted for about a month starting from 26 March, in the George Sound area.
- 27 April 1949: Several expedition members, including the survey team, some scientists and a photographer (Miller, Litt, Dick, Moor, Mason, Lindsay, Forster, Bidgood) left Fiordland, returning to Invercargill.
- late April/early May 1949: The expedition moved to the Glaisnock River camps.
- 5 May 1949: Murie departed Fiordland.
- 7-8 May & 13 May 1949: The field party dismantled the camps and MV Alert completed its final sailings for this expedition from Caswell Sound and George Sound. The Dominion Museum in Wellington then became the operational headquarters.

Other zoologists, botanists, foresters and geologists arrived later than 26 February, remained for shorter periods, and worked independently to the main expedition party.

== Expedition publications ==
- Alick Lindsay Poole, ed. (1951). "Preliminary reports of The New Zealand - American Fiordland Expedition". Bulletin of the New Zealand Department of Scientific and Industrial Research. 103. Wellington: Department of Scientific and Industrial Research: 1–99. ISSN 0077-961X. Wikidata Q125475906.
- A. L. POOLE (March 1952). "New Zealand-American Fiordland Expedition". Nature. 169 (4298): 434–435. doi:10.1038/169434A0. ISSN 1476-4687. Wikidata Q59087828.
- A. L. POOLE (1951). "Flora and Vegetation of the Caswell and George Sounds District Area Covered by the New Zealand-American Fiordland Expedition" (PDF). Transactions and Proceedings of the Royal Society of New Zealand. 79: 62–83. ISSN 1176-6166. Wikidata Q89183242.

== Accomplishments ==
A survey of wapiti in the area covered by the expedition recorded 180 observations of wapiti, including 40 wapiti in the Charles Sound area, 75 in the Stillwater River area, 17 near George Sound, and 40 near Lake Te Anau. Based on these and other observations, the total number of wapiti in Fiordland was estimated to be between 500-1000 individuals. Red deer were found in similar or greater numbers and hybrids between the two closely related species, which do not co-occur or hybridise in their native range, were also found. Murie noted that wapiti shifted their breeding season from September-October in the United States to March-April in New Zealand, they shifted their diet to a completely new flora, and there were several observations of accidental death of wapiti from falls or injuries in the rugged Fiordland terrain.

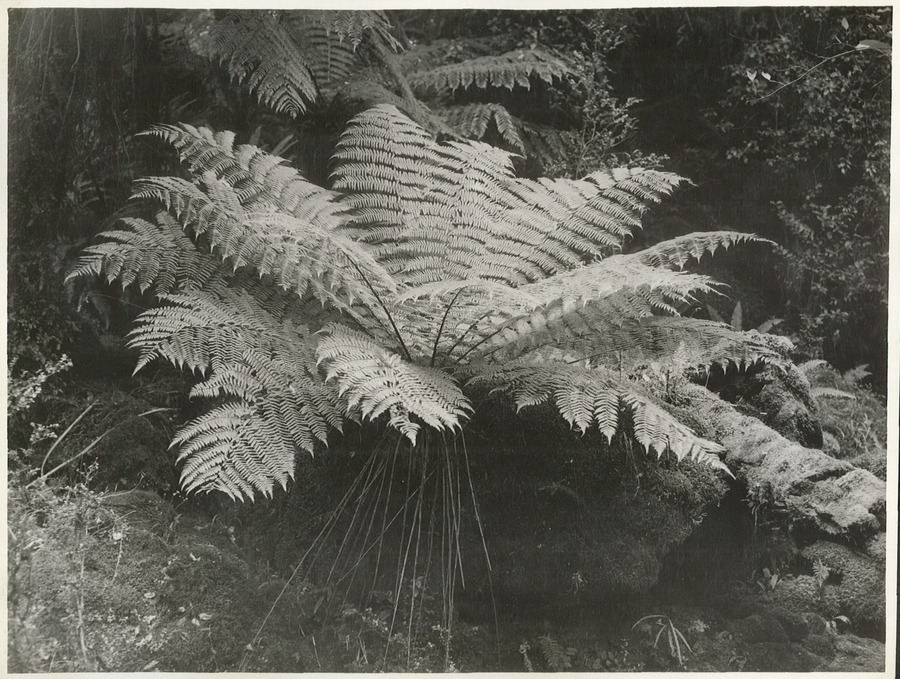
A tree fern photographed by expedition photographer Kenneth Bigwood during the trip

About 45 wapiti specimens were collected during the expedition, and only the skin, a stomach sample and skull were collected from each animal. Preparator Lindsay boiled the skulls, cleaned and salted the skins, and sent the skulls "packed in moss" to the Dominion Museum, Wellington, and then on to Murie in the United States. Te Papa has retained at least one of these specimens.

The botanists on the expedition observed based on field evidence that the diet of wapiti and red deer in Fiordland comprised several preferred shrubs and trees, including Pseudopanax colensoi, Raukaua simplex, Griselinia littoralis, Coprosma foetidissima and Muehlenbeckia australis. Other shrubs, such as Schefflera digitata and Carmichaelia arborea were eliminated from all but inaccessible sites. Ruth Mason examined the stomach contents of 39 specimens from the expedition, which included "twigs, leaf fragments, and seeds", and found that there were between four and 21 different identifiable plants in each stomach sample. Griselinia littoralis was the most frequent and abundant plant found, with Nothofagus menziesii in second place, but several other trees and shrubs, as well as ferns, grasses, sedges were also able to be identified from the stomach remains.

The land surveyors carried out a major triangulation of the study area of c. 100 square miles, but they could only use the theodolite on fine days, when the weather was clear. During the five months of the expedition, the team had only 15 (or possibly 17) fine days, yet they still managed to "provide height and position control for detailed mapping form aerial photographs". They ascended most of the prominent peaks in the study area - sometimes twice - many of which had not likely been climbed before, and at one point they spent 5 weeks surveying without returning to base camp. Their efforts would greatly improved the detail of maps in Fiordland.

Additional reports on the following topics were also written up: geology, climate, botany (including a list of plants observed and their abundance), forests, small introduced mammals (possums, rats, mice and mustelids), invertebrates, fish (freshwater and marine), birds, land survey, and opportunities for tourism. A number of scientific specimens was collected by the expedition scientists; for example, there are over 200 plant specimens at Manaaki Whenua - Landcare Research Allan Herbarium (labelled "N.Z. – American Fiordland Expedition"). Notable finds by the expedition included a cache of Māori adzes, two kākāpō, twelve species of Opiliones (of which most were new species), and up to twenty new species of spiders.

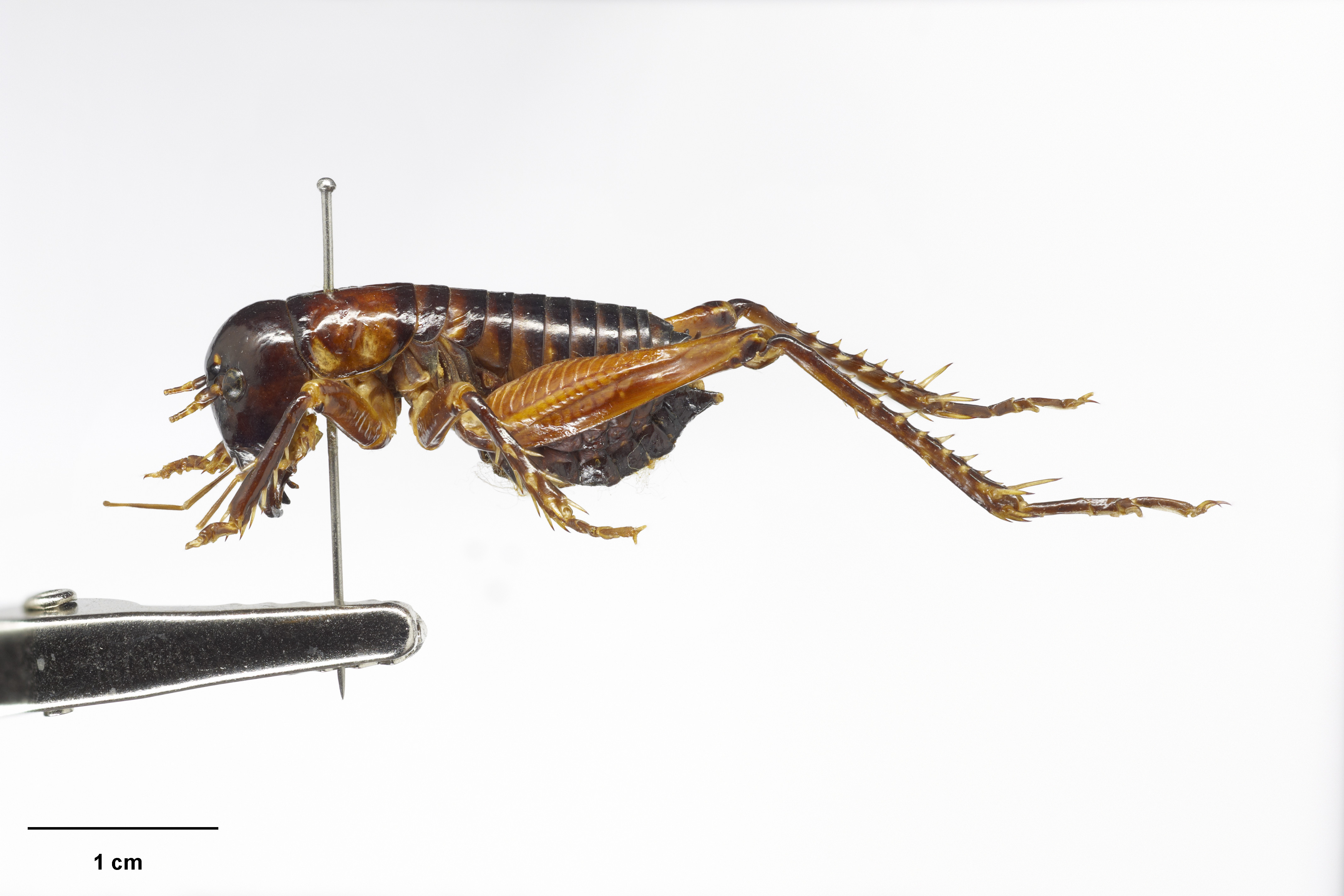
Holotype specimen of the ground wētā, Hemiandrus fiordensis, collected on this expedition and stored at Te Papa

The holotype specimen of a new species of wētā, Zealandosandrus fiordensis (now called Hemiandrus fiordensis) was collected by Richard Dell on this expedition and described by John Salmon in 1950.

Cameramen from the National Film Unit spent 10 days on the expedition making an eleven-minute film entitled, "Fiordland Expedition, 1949", which was released in late May 1949. The 16mm film was said to be 1000 feet long, "includes a sequence of scenic shots and others on camp life", and is stored in Te Papa's archive.
