= Juan Luis Riado =

Spanish footballer

Riado
Personal information
- Full name: Juan Luis Riado López
- Date of birth: 24 July 1956 (age 70)
- Place of birth: Adra, Spain
- Height: 1.82 m (6 ft 0 in)
- Position: Midfielder

Senior career*
| Years | Team | Apps | (Gls) |
| 1976–1977 | Almería | | |
| 1978–1979 | Vinaròs | 38 | (7) |
| 1979–1980 | Palencia | 5 | (0) |
| 1980–1985 | Mallorca | 156 | (25) |
| 1985–1986 | Elche | 21 | (1) |
| 1986–1987 | Poblense | 46 | (1) |
| 1990–1991 | Platges de Calvià | | |
- * Club domestic league appearances and goals

Juan Luis Riado López (born 24 July 1956) is a Spanish former footballer who played as a midfielder.

Riado made his debut at 19 for AD Almería against Sevilla Atlético for Segunda División B. He joined to RCD Mallorca on 1980–1981 and spend many season on this club, winning the 1980–81 Segunda División B title, and playing the 1983–84 La Liga season.
