= Abdera, Spain =

Abdera
- Location within Spain
- 36°45′N 3°01′W
- Location: Spain
- Region: Andalusia

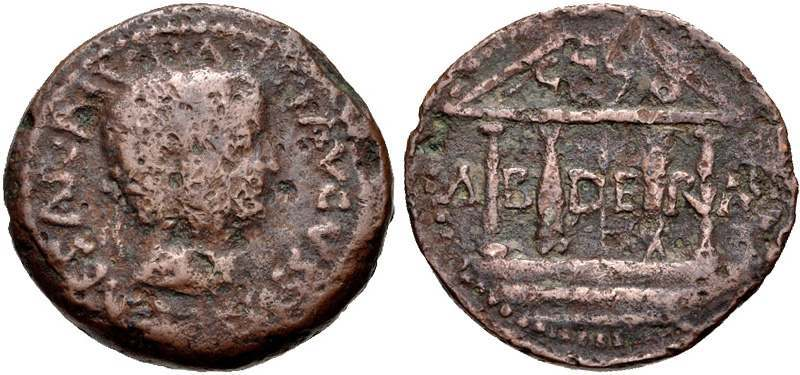
As of Tiberius from Abdera, Spain

Abdera was an ancient Carthaginian and Roman port on a hill above the modern Adra on the southeastern Mediterranean coast of Spain. It was located between Malaca (now Málaga) and Carthago Nova (now Cartagena) in the district inhabited by the Bastuli.

== Name ==
Abdera shares its name with a city in Thrace and another in North Africa. Its coins bore the inscription ʾbdrt (Punic: 𐤏𐤁𐤃𐤓𐤕). (Note: Coins bearing only the first four letters appear to have been badly struck. A single example attested in 19th-century sources bore the six letters ʾbdrʾt (𐤀𐤁𐤃𐤓𐤀𐤕) but can no longer be found at the Cabinet des Médailles.) The first element in the name appears to be the Punic word for "servant" or "slave"; the second element seems shared by the Phoenician names for Gadir (now Cadiz) and Cythera but of unclear meaning.

It appears in Greek sources as tà Ábdēra (Ancient Greek: τὰ Ἄβδηρα) and Aúdēra (Αὔδηρα), Ábdara (Ἄβδαρα), and tò Ábdēron (τὸ Ἄβδηρον).

== History ==
Abdera was founded in the 8th century BCE as a Phoenician colony. It became a Carthaginian trading station and, after a period of decline, became one of the more important towns in the Roman province of Hispania Baetica. Tiberius seems to have made the place a Roman colony.

== Coins ==
The most ancient coins bear its name with the head of Melqart and a tuna. Coins from the time of Tiberius show the town's main temple with two erect tunas as its columns. Early Roman coins were bilingual with Latin inscriptions on one side stating the name of the emperor and the town and with Punic text on the other side simply stating the name of the town.
