= Lindsay Poole =

New Zealand botanist (1908–2008)

Alick Lindsay Poole
- Born: 4 March 1908; Whatatutu, New Zealand
- Died: 2 January 2008 (aged 99); Wellington, New Zealand
- Scientific career
- Fields: Botany, forestry
- Institutions: Department of Scientific and Industrial Research, New Zealand Forest Service

Alick Lindsay Poole CBE (4 March 1908 – 2 January 2008) was a New Zealand botanist and forester.

== Academic career ==
Poole started at the New Zealand State Forest Service 1926, then to Auckland University College on a scholarship. After various jobs during the Great Depression, he joined the Botany Division of the DSIR in 1937. He enlisted in 1940, and spent the war at the Scientific Liaison Office in London. After the war he worked for the British zone in Germany gaining valuable experience. In 1947 he was appointed assistant director of the Botany Division of DSIR. Poole was deputy scientific leader and one of the botanists on the 1949 New Zealand American Fiordland Expedition. In 1951 he was appointed assistant director of the New Zealand Forest Service and rose to become director-general, retiring in 1971.

In 1953, Poole was awarded the Queen Elizabeth II Coronation Medal. He was elected Fellow of the Royal Society of New Zealand in 1962. In the 1971 New Year Honours, Poole was appointed a Commander of the Order of the British Empire, for services to the development of forestry and the forest industries.

Poole died in Wellington in 2008.

== Selected works ==
- Trees and shrubs of New Zealand
- Wild animals in New Zealand
- The use of vegetation
- Southern beeches
- Forestry in New Zealand; the shaping of policy
- A. L. POOLE (1951). "Flora and Vegetation of the Caswell and George Sounds District Area Covered by the New Zealand-American Fiordland Expedition" (PDF). Transactions and Proceedings of the Royal Society of New Zealand. 79: 62–83. ISSN 1176-6166. Wikidata Q89183242.
