= List of Ramsar sites in Spain =

This list of Ramsar sites in Spain includes wetlands that are considered to be of international importance under the Ramsar Convention. Spain currently has 74 sites designated as "Wetlands of International Importance" with a surface area of 303,090 hectares (3,030.9 km^{2}). For a full list of all Ramsar sites worldwide, see List of Ramsar wetlands of international importance.

== List of Ramsar Sites ==
Name	Location	Area (km^{2})	Designated	Description	Image
Aiguamolls de l'Empordà	Catalonia; 42°14′N 03°06′E	47.84	26 March 1993	A malarial swampland between the Rivers Fluvià and Muga.	
Albufera de Adra	Andalusia; 36°45′N 02°57′W	0.75	4 October 1994		
Albufera de Valencia	Valencian Community; 39°20′N 00°21′W	210	5 December 1989		
Bahía de Cádiz	Andalusia; 36°30′N 06°11′W	100	24 October 2002	A freshwater lagoon and estuary on the Gulf of Cádiz coast.	
Colas del Embalse de Ullibarri	Basque Country; 42°54′N 02°33′W	3.97	24 October 2002		
Complejo de Corrubedo	Galicia; 42°33′N 09°02′W	5.50	26 March 1993		
Complejo intermareal Umia-Grove	Galicia; 42°28′N 08°50′W	25.61	5 December 1989		
Complejo lagunar de La Albuera	Extremadura; 38°42′N 06°46′W	18.78	20 December 2002		
Delta del Ebro	Catalonia; 40°43′N 00°44′E	77.36	26 March 1993	Habitat for migratory birds and waterfowl including the world's largest colony of Audouin's gulls. The delta includes wetlands, beaches, marshes, salt pans, and estuaries.	
Doñana	Andalusia; 36°57′N 06°19′W	1116.46	4 May 1982		
Embalse de las Cañas	Navarre; 42°29′N 02°24′W	1.01	18 November 1996		
Embalse de Orellana	Extremadura; 38°59′N 05°32′W	55	26 March 1993		
Embalses de Cordobilla y Malpasillo	Andalusia; 37°19′N 04°40′W	19.72	4 October 1994		
Humedales de la Sierra de Urbión	La Rioja; 42°1′N 2°53′W	0.86	27 January 2006		
Humedales del Macizo de Peñalara	Madrid; 40°51′N 3°57′W	4.87	27 January 2006		
Humedales y Turberas de Padul	Andalusia; 37°0′N 3°36′W	3.27	27 January 2006		
Lake of Banyoles	Catalonia; 42°08′N 02°46′E	10.33	20 December 2002		
Lago de Caicedo-Yuso y Salinas de Añana	Basque Country; 42°48′N 02°59′W	0.26	24 October 2002		
Laguna de Chiprana	Aragon; 41°13′N 00°12′W	1.62	7 June 1994		
Laguna de El Hito	Castile-La Mancha; 39°52′N 02°41′W	5.73	20 December 2002		
Fuente de Piedra Lagoon	Andalusia; 37°07′N 04°46′W	13.64	8 August 1983		
Laguna de Gallocanta	Aragon; 40°58′N 01°33′W	67.2	7 June 1994		
Laguna de la Nava de Fuentes	Castile and León; 42°04′N 04°45′W	3.26	24 October 2002		
Laguna de la Vega (o del Pueblo)	Castile-La Mancha; 39°25′N 02°56′W	0.34	5 December 1989		
Laguna de Manjavacas	Castile-La Mancha; 39°25′N 02°50′W	2.31	26 March 1993		
Laguna de Pitillas	Navarre; 42°24′N 01°34′W	2.16	18 November 1996		
Laguna del Prado	Castile-La Mancha; 38°55′N 03°49′W	0.52	26 March 1993		
Laguna y Arenal de Valdoviño	Galicia; 43°37′N 08°10′W	4.85	26 March 1993		
Lagunas de Alcázar de San Juan	Castile-La Mancha; 39°24′N 03°15′W	2.4	26 March 1993		
Lagunas de Cádiz (Laguna de Medina y Laguna Salada)	Andalusia; 36°37′N 06°03′W	1.58	5 December 1989		
Lagunas de Campotejar	Murcia; 38°6′35″N 1°13′11″W	0.61	7 January 2011		
Lagunas de la Mata y Torrevieja	Valencian Community; 38°00′N 00°42′W	36.93	5 December 1989		
Lagunas de las Moreras	Murcia; 37°34′47″N 1°18′0″W	0.73	7 January 2011		
Lagunas de Laguardia (Álava): Carralogroño, Carravalseca, Prao de la Paul y Musco	Basque Country; 42°32′N 02°33′W	0.45	9 December 1996		
Lagunas de Puebla de Beleña	Castile-La Mancha; 40°53′N 03°15′W	1.91	20 December 2002		
Lagunas de Ruidera	Castile-La Mancha; 38°56′23″N 2°51′35″W	66.39	23 September 2011		
Lagunas de Villafáfila	Castile and León; 41°49′N 05°37′W	27.14	5 December 1989		
Lagunas del sur de Córdoba (Zóñar, Rincón y Amarga)	Andalusia; 37°29′N 04°41′W	0.86	5 December 1989		
Las Tablas de Daimiel	Castile-La Mancha; 39°09′N 03°40′W	19.28	4 May 1982		
Mar Menor	Murcia; 37°43′N 00°48′W	149.33	4 October 1994		
Marismas de Santoña	Cantabria; 43°25′N 03°26′W	69.07	4 October 1994		
Marismas del Odiel	Andalusia; 37°17′N 06°55′W	71.85	5 December 1989		
Marjal de Pego-Oliva	Valencian Community; 38°52′N 00°04′W	12.90	4 October 1994		
Pantano de El Hondo	Valencian Community; 38°10′N 00°42′W	23.87	5 December 1989		
Paraje Natural Brazo del Este	Andalusia; 37°8′N 6°2′W	13.62	27 January 2006		
Paraje Natural Lagunas de Palos y Las Madres	Andalusia; 37°9′N 6°52′W	6.35	27 January 2006		
Paraje Natural Punta Entinas-Sabinar	Andalusia; 36°42′N 2°42′W	19.48	27 January 2006		
Paraje Natural Laguna Grande	Andalusia; 37°56′N 3°34′W	2	17 September 2009		
Parque Nacional de Aigüestortes i Estany de Sant Maurici	Catalonia; 42°34′N 0°56′E	399.79	27 January 2006		
Parque Nacional Marítimo-Terrestre de las Islas Atlánticas de Galicia	Galicia; 42°21′N 08°56′W	85.426	22 May 2021		
Prat de Cabanes-Torreblanca	Valencian Community; 40°14′N 0°12′E	8.12	5 December 1989		
Reserva Natural Complejo Endorreico de Chiclana	Andalusia; 36°27′N 6°5′W	7.93	17 September 2009		
Reserva Natural Complejo Endorreico de Espera	Andalusia; 36°52′N 5°52′W	5.14	27 January 2006		
Reserva Natural Complejo Endorreico de Puerto Real	Andalusia; 36°32′N 6°2′W	8.63	17 September 2009		
Reserva Natural Complejo Endorreico Lebrija-Las Cabezas	Andalusia; 36°55′N 5°54′W	8.97	17 September 2009		
Reserva Natural Lagunas de Archidona	Andalusia; 37°6′N 4°18′W	2.04	17 September 2009		
Reserva Natural Laguna de los Jarales	Andalusia; 37°18′N 4°34′W	1.47	27 January 2006		
Reserva Natural Laguna de Tiscar	Andalusia; 37°25′N 4°49′W	1.85	27 January 2006		
Reserva Natural Laguna del Chinche	Andalusia; 37°36′N 4°9′W	2.21	27 January 2006		
Reserva Natural Laguna del Conde o El Salobral	Andalusia; 37°34′N 4°12′W	3.45	27 January 2006		
Reserva Natural Laguna Honda	Andalusia; 37°35′N 4°8′W	3.68	27 January 2006		
Reserva Natural Lagunas de Campillos	Andalusia; 37°2′N 4°49′W	13.42	27 January 2006		
Ría de Mundaka-Guernika	Basque Country; 43°22′N 02°40′E	9.45	26 March 1993		
Ría de Villaviciosa	Asturias; 43°31′12″N 5°23′23″W	9.45	7 January 2011		
Ría del Eo	Galicia, Asturias; 43°42′N 07°01′W	17.4	4 October 1994		
Rías de Ortigueira y Ladrido	Galicia; 43°42′N 07°47′W	29.20	5 December 1989		
Saladar de Jandía	Canary Islands; 28°03′N 14°20′W	1.27	24 October 2002		
Saladas de Sástago-Bujaraloz	Aragon; 41°23′59″N 0°12′36″W	81.45	7 January 2011		
S'Albufera de Mallorca	Balearic Islands; 39°49′N 03°07′E	17	5 December 1989		
Salburua	Basque Country; 42°51′N 02°39′W	1.74	24 October 2002		
Salinas de Ibiza y Formentera	Balearic Islands; 38°46′N 01°26′E	16.40	30 November 1993		
Salinas de Santa Pola	Valencian Community; 38°08′N 00°37′W	24.96	5 December 1989		
Salinas del Cabo de Gata	Andalusia; 36°44′N 02°12′W	3	5 December 1989	Salt flats located between the village of San Miguel and the Cabo de Gata point in Cabo de Gata-Níjar Natural Park.	
Tremedales de Orihuela	Aragon; 40°31′48″N 1°39′0″W	18.45	7 January 2011		
Txingudi	Basque Country; 43°20′N 01°47′W	1.28	24 October 2002		

== See also ==
- Ramsar Convention
- List of Ramsar sites worldwide
