= Ruppia megacarpa =

Conservation status
- Least Concern (IUCN 3.1)

Scientific classification
- Kingdom: Plantae
- Clade: Tracheophytes
- Clade: Angiosperms
- Clade: Monocots
- Order: Alismatales
- Family: Ruppiaceae
- Genus: Ruppia
- Species: R. megacarpa

Binomial name
- Ruppia megacarpa R.Mason

Species of aquatic plant

Ruppia megacarpa is a submerged herb species in the genus Ruppia found in shallow brackish waters. It is a common on Australasian coasts, including Australia (NSW; SA; Vic; WA and New Zealand (type locality). Isolated populations have been currently found in East Asia, including Japan, Korea, and Far East Russia, hence, the species distribution exhibit latitudinally disjunct (antitropical) distribution between East Asia and Australasia.

== Ecology ==
This species is known to have hybridized with 'Occidentalis' of the R. maritima complex in Hokkaido, Japan.
