= Ruppia bicarpa =

Scientific classification
- Kingdom: Plantae
- Clade: Tracheophytes
- Clade: Angiosperms
- Clade: Monocots
- Order: Alismatales
- Family: Ruppiaceae
- Genus: Ruppia
- Species: R. bicarpa

Binomial name
- Ruppia bicarpa Yu Ito et Muasya

Species of aquatic plant

Ruppia bicarpa is an aquatic plant species in the genus Ruppia of Ruppiaceae. It is found in shallow waters.

== Distribution and habitat ==
Known only from Western Cape, South Africa.
