= Genetic admixture =

Interbreeding between isolated populations

In genetics and evolutionary biology, genetic admixture occurs when previously isolated populations of organisms interbreed, resulting in a population with genetic ancestry from both sources. It can occur between species, such as with hybrids, or within species, such as when geographically distant individuals migrate to new regions. It results in a population with genetic backgrounds, or a gene pool, that is a mix of the source populations. Genetic admixture is recognized as an important contributor to rapid evolutionary responses, both at the level of gene flow between populations and between species.

== Examples ==
Climatic cycles facilitate genetic admixture in cold periods and genetic diversification in warm periods. Natural flooding can cause genetic admixture within populations of migrating fish species. Genetic admixture may have an important role for the success of populations that colonise a new area and interbreed with individuals of native populations. Similarly, climate-associated genetic variants may move more quickly by admixture than background variation across the genome.

== Mapping ==
Admixture mapping is a method of gene mapping that uses a population of mixed ancestry (an admixed population) to find the genetic loci that contribute to differences in diseases or other phenotypes found between the different ancestral populations. The method is best applied to populations with recent admixture from two populations that were previously genetically isolated. The method attempts to correlate the degree of ancestry near a genetic locus with the phenotype or disease of interest. Genetic markers that differ in frequency between the ancestral populations are needed across the genome.

Admixture mapping is based on the assumption that differences in disease rates or phenotypes are due in part to differences in the frequencies of disease-causing or phenotype-causing genetic variants between populations. In an admixed population, these causal variants occur more frequently on chromosomal segments inherited from one or another ancestral population. The first admixture scans were published in 2005 and since then genetic contributors to a variety of disease and trait differences have been mapped.

== See also ==
- Chloroplast capture
- Gene cluster
- Gene flow
- Haplogroup
- Human genetic variation
- Hybrid
- Hybrid vigor
- Interbreeding between archaic and modern humans
- Introgression
- Population groups in biomedicine
