= Lagunas de Laguardia =

Wetland in the Basque Country, Spain

Coordinates: 42.554028°N 2.572653°W

Lakes of Laguardia Nature Reserve
- Reserva natural de las Lagunas de Laguardia (Spanish); Guardiako aintziren natura erreserba (Basque)
- IUCN category Ia (strict nature reserve)
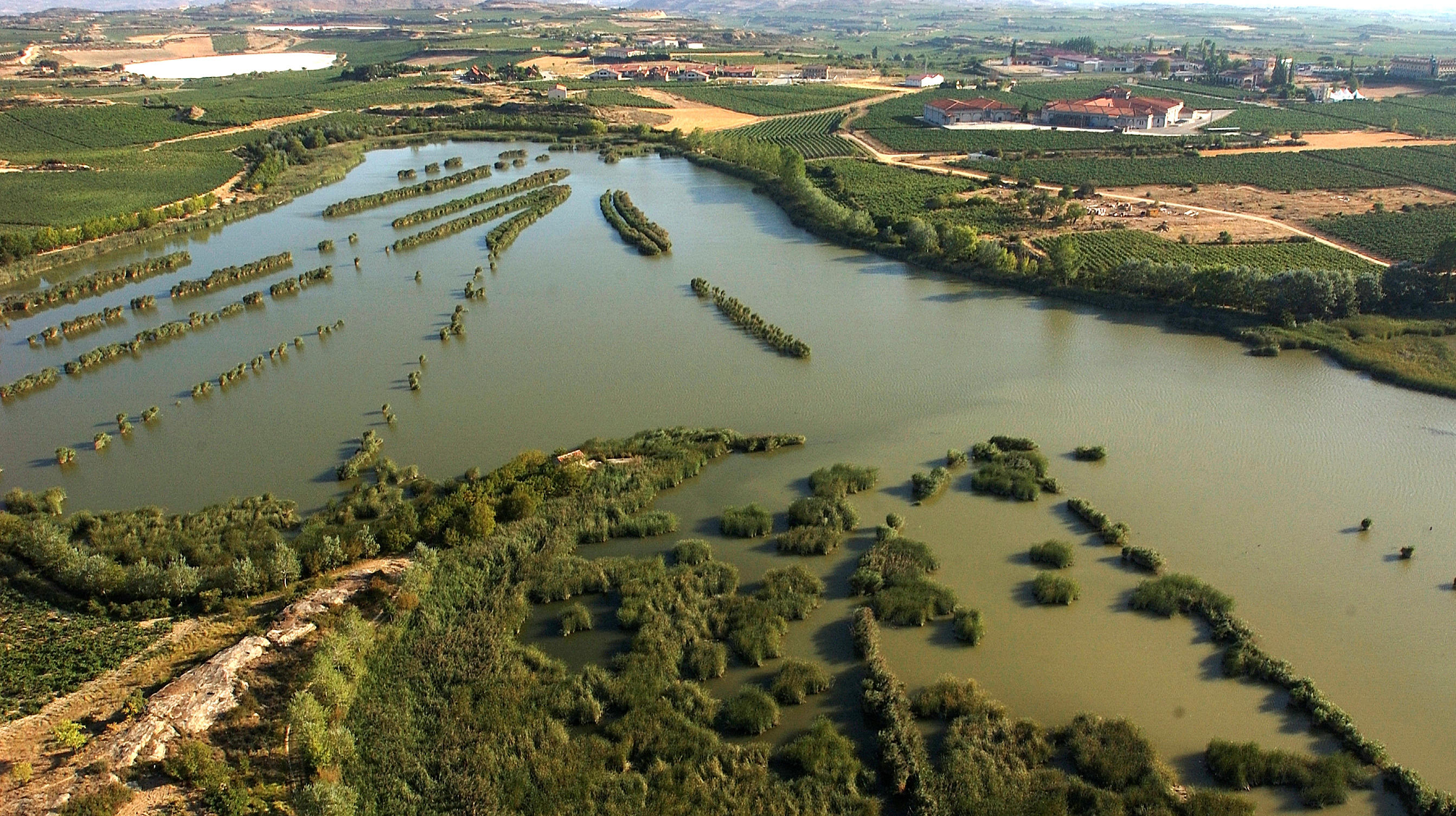
- The Prao de la Paúl reservoir
- Location: Laguardia, Álava, Basque Country, Spain
- Area: 80.57 ha (199.1 acres)
- Established: 19 September 1995

Ramsar Wetland
- Designated: 12 September 1996
- Reference no.: 880
- Area: 45 ha (110 acres)

Natura 2000 site (SAC)
- Official name: Guardiako aintzirak / Lagunas de Laguardia
- Designated: June 2016
- Reference no.: ES2110021

The Lagunas de Laguardia (Spanish for 'Lakes of Laguardia', Basque: Guardiako aintzirak) are a wetland complex near Laguardia, Álava, Basque Country, Spain. Three of the lakes (Carravalseca, Carralogroño and Musco) are endorheic seasonal lakes, while the fourth (Prao de la Paúl) is actually a reservoir built at the site of a former wet area. The wetlands were declared a protected biotope by the Basque Government in 1995, they have also been designated a Ramsar wetland and a Natura 2000 site. In 2023 it was reclassified as a nature reserve.

== Flora and fauna ==
The margins of the Prao de la Paúl reservoir are covered by helophytes and reeds. There are some hydrophytes present (Persicaria amphibia, Callitriche stagnalis, Polygonum amphibium and Lemna minor), but their extent has been reduced due to the presence of invasive animal species (carps and Louisiana crawifsh). The flora of the endorheic lakes is characterized by its resistance to water level changes, with three species present: Ruppia cirrhosa, Ruppia drepanensis and Chara vulgaris.

When the Prao de la Paúl reservoir was filled, signal crayfish were introduced by the authorities, but this population has probably died off. The Louisiana crawfish was illegally introduced around 1993, it has been deemed an invasive species due to its uncontrollable growth and damage to the local flora. Prao de la Paúl is home to the only fish population of the wetlands, consisting of introduced Eurasian carps and goldfish.

Several amphibian species are present in the lakes, including seven types of frog (Perez's frog, the European tree frog, the common toad, the natterjack toad, Pelobates cultripes, the common midwife toad and the common parsley frog) and the marbled newt. The observed reptile species include Psammodromus algirus, the ocellated lizard, the ladder snake and Malpolon monspessulanus. Additionally, up to 118 different bird species have been observed within a one-year period. The nesting bird species are the little grebe, the common pochard, the water rail, the common moorhen, the Eurasian coot and the mallard.
