= Álvaro Santiago =

Spanish footballer

Personal information
- Full name: Miguel Álvaro Santiago Domínguez
- Date of birth: 23 February 1949 (age 77)
- Place of birth: Adra, Spain
- Height: 1.77 m (5 ft 10 in)
- Position: Defender

Senior career*
Years	Team	Apps	(Gls)
1970–1971	Valdepeñas		
1971–1972	Tarrasa		
1973–1981	Sabadell	159+	(1+)
- * Club domestic league appearances and goals

Miguel Álvaro Santiago Domínguez (born 23 February 1949), sometimes known as just Santi, is a Spanish former professional footballer who played as a defender.

Santiago started his career en CF Valdepeñas, and joined to Segunda División club CE Sabadell FC on 1973. He retired as footballer at the end of 1980–81 season.
