= I.E.S. Abdera School =

School in Adra, Spain

Coordinates: 36.74696°N 3.02513°W

I.E.S Abdera is a secondary school in Adra, Spain. It caters for students aged 11–18 and is part of the Bilingual programme (English)
