= Margaret J.A. Simpson =

Scotland-born New Zealand botanist, botanical collector, and mountaineer (1920–1996)

- Born: Margaret Jane Annand Simpson; 7 July 1920; Scotland
- Died: 3 May 1996 (aged 76)
- Other names: Margaret Bulfin, Margaret J.A. Bulfin, Margaret Jane Annand Bulfin, M.J.A. Simpson
- Occupations: botanist, botanical collector, mountaineer
- Notable work: Seeds of New Zealand Gymnosperms and Dicotyledons

Margaret Jane Annand Bulfin (née Simpson) (1920–1996) was a Scotland-born New Zealand botanist, botanical collector, and mountaineer. She was an expert on New Zealand seeds and their germination, viability and identification, and as a Scientist at the Department of Scientific and Industrial Research she performed extensive field work including vegetation surveys in different areas of New Zealand. She co-authored the book Seeds of New Zealand Gymnosperms and Dicotyledons, and was awarded the Allan Mere Award for her contributions to New Zealand botany.

== Early life ==
Margaret Jane Annand Simpson was born in Scotland on 7 July 1920 and emigrated with her family to New Zealand when she was five years old. She grew up in the Bay of Plenty, and became an avid tramper, mountaineer and botanist.

== Education and career ==
Simpson received a Diploma of Horticulture at Massey Agricultural College (now Massey University) in 1945, and later a BSc at Auckland University. In 1950 she started working as a science technician in the Botany Division of the Department of Scientific and Industrial Research (DSIR) with botanists Lucy Moore and Ruth Mason, first in Wellington and then in Christchurch and Lincoln.

One of the projects Simpson assisted with early in her career was the curation of a fruit and seed collection, which she continued to work on for the next thirty years until she retired. Other projects she worked on included a long-term high-country vegetation field study at Molesworth Station, and a vegetation survey of Nelson Lakes National Park. For over a decade of the latter project, New Zealand horticulturalist Janet Moss was her field assistant and boatman.

Simpson was appointed as DSIR Scientist in 1974, and her research focused on native New Zealand species' seed germination, viability and identification. She was a keen field botanist, and went on many field trips, often in the company of other women botanists as well as visiting international botanists. Although she retired in July 1985, she continued her research on seeds.

== Legacy ==
In 1991, Simpson received the New Zealand Botanical Society Allan Mere Award, which acknowledged her contribution to research on New Zealand seeds and their germination, including the valuable seed reference collection that she put together.

Although she was not a taxonomist, Simpson named one species together with Lucy Moore: Myosotis brockiei L.B.Moore & M.J.A.Simpson. At least two plants have been named after her, both of which are found in Nelson Lakes National Park:

- Epilobium margaretiae Brockie, a species of willowherb endemic to New Zealand
- Pseudocyphellaria margaretiae D.J.Galloway, a New Zealand lichen

Simpson collected nearly 4,000 herbarium specimens over the course of her career, most of which are housed at the Allan Herbarium at Manaaki Whenua – Landcare Research in Lincoln. She published a handful of scientific articles over the course of her scientific career, and these were published under her unmarried name, Margaret J.A. Simpson. In 2001 she co-authored a major book, Seeds of New Zealand Gymnosperms and Dicotyledons, with her colleague Colin J. Webb. Through her botanical field work, Simpson became interested in French naturalists who visited New Zealand, and she wrote short biographies of Jules Dumont d'Urville and Étienne Raoul, among others.

== Personal life ==
Simpson was an experienced mountaineer who summited numerous peaks in New Zealand, and elsewhere. She and her husband Raymond Alexander Bulfin lived near the banks of the Liffey in Lincoln, where she enjoyed gardening and music. Simpson died on 3 May 1996.

== Important works ==
- Webb, Colin James; Simpson, Margaret Jane (2001), Seeds of New Zealand Gymnosperms and Dicotyledons, Caxton Press, Wikidata Q125388353
- Simpson, Margaret Jane; Mason, Ruth (1984). "The flora of the Canterbury dune system (New Brighton - Waipara) in the 1980's". New Zealand Natural Sciences. 11. doi:10.26021/349. Wikidata Q97665384.
- Simpson, Margaret Jane (1974). "Senecio bifistulosus Hook. f. — A rare shrub endemic to New Zealand". New Zealand Journal of Botany. 12 (4): 567–573. doi:10.1080/0028825x.1974.10428642. Wikidata Q111344830.
- Moore, Lucy Beatrice; Simpson, Margaret Jane (1973). "A New Myosotis from North-west Nelson". New Zealand Journal of Botany. 11 (1): 163–170. doi:10.1080/0028825x.1973.10430270. Wikidata Q55756342.
- Moore, Lucy Beatrice; Simpson, Margaret Jane (1961). "Row trials of grasses at Molesworth station". New Zealand Journal of Agricultural Research. 4 (1–2): 83–98. doi:10.1080/00288233.1961.10419923. Wikidata Q119673031.
