= David Alexander Brown =

British geologist

David Alexander Brown (8 February 1916 – 3 November 2009) was a geologist who played an important role in developing the study of Geology in Australia. He was born on 8 February 1916 in Scotland. His father fought and died at Gallipoli in World War I. His mother took him to New Zealand when he was four years old.

He studied at the University of New Zealand and graduated in 1937 with a Master of Science degree. In 1936 he started work in a field geologist job at the New Zealand Geological Survey. In 1938 he changed jobs, working for the New Zealand Petroleum Exploration Group.

When World War II broke out he first joined the New Zealand Expeditionary Force, and then later the Royal Navy. He took up flying aircraft from aircraft carriers, in the Fleet Air Arm. He was posted to the Barents Sea and North Sea. His highlight was to bomb the German battleship Tirpitz in April 1944 in Altenfjord a Norwegian fjord while flying a Fairey Barracuda torpedo bomber in Operation Tungsten.

He found his wife Patrica in the Women's Royal Naval Service. After the war they lived in London.

Brown was given a post graduate scholarship to study Bryozoa (or Polyzoans) from the Tertiary period in New Zealand. His jobs were at the Imperial College of Science and Technology and the British Museum of Natural History. In 1948 he graduated with a PhD and a DIC, and an award of the Lyell Fund from the Geological Society of London in 1953. He became a world expert on polyzoa, and a good taxonomist.

After this he migrated back to New Zealand and rejoined the New Zealand Geological Survey. Brown was one of two geologists on the 1949 New Zealand American Fiordland Expedition. The Otago University recruited him as a lecturer in 1950. In 1959 he accepted at job at the Canberra University College as the chair of geology. He set up the geology department, not specialising but employing people with a range of specialities. At various times he was the dean of science, dean of students, and he ensured the library had a good range of journals.

Brown was the president of the Geological Society of Australia. He was skilled at translating Russian to English and wrote a Russian to English dictionary for geoscience.

A bryozoan species from the Schizoporellidae was named after him, Dakaria dabrowni. A mollusc Mauidrillia browni is named after him.

He had three children and nine grandchildren. He died 3 November 2009 in Sydney.

== Publications ==
- The Tertiary Cheilostomatous Polyzoa of New Zealand published Rudolph William Sabbot January 1952, ISBN 0-565-00064-0
- Ore Deposits Of Ussr, Vol. 3 ISBN 978-0-273-01039-5
- The geological evolution of Australia & New Zealand 1968
- Fossil Bryozoa from drill holes on Eniwetok Atoll 1964
- On the polyzoan genus Crepidacantha Levinsen 1954
- Proceedings of Specialists' Meeting held at Canberra, 25–31 May 1968
- The Facies of regional metamorphism at high pressures 1975
- Dannevirke Subdivision maps and bulletin 1953, Montague Ongley, Albert Mathieson Quennell, David Alexander Brown and Arnold Robert Lillie (mapping from 1936 to 1941)
- Te Aute Subdivision, central Hawkes Bay maps and bulletin Jacobus Theodorus Kingma and David Alexander Brown pub 1971
- Fossil cheilostomatous polyzoa from south-west Victoria Melbourne Department of Mines, 1957
- Deep-seated inclusions in kimberlites and the problem of the composition of the upper mantle / by N. V. Sobolev, translation
- A Russian – English Geosciences Dictionary РУССКО – АНГЛИЙСКИЙ СЛОВАРЬ: НАУК О ЗЕМЛЕ 2001 Canberra
