= Watervalley Wetlands =

Wetland system in South Australia

- Location within South Australia
- Location: Murray and Mallee & Limestone Coast regions South Australia
- Coordinates: 36°28′0″S 140°11′0″E
- Basin countries: Australia
- Managing agency: Wetlands and Wildlife Trust; South Eastern Water Conservation and Drainage Board
- Designation: Nationally important wetland
- Surface area: 56.6 square kilometres (21.9 sq mi)
- Surface elevation: 15 to 35 metres (49 to 115 ft)

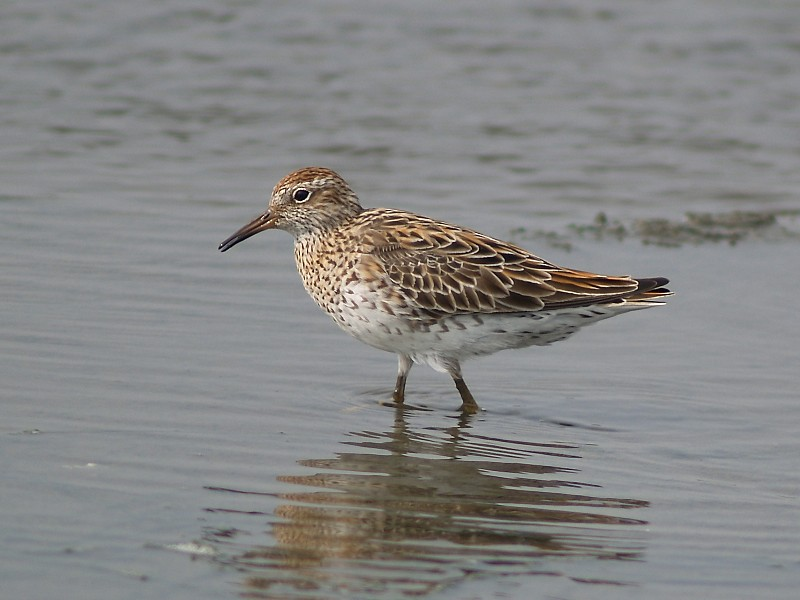
The wetlands are an important site for sharp-tailed sandpipers

The Watervalley Wetlands is a nationally important wetland system in the Australian state of South Australia that consists of a series of contiguous wetlands, lying on 56.6 square kilometres (21.9 sq mi) of private land between the Coorong National Park and Gum Lagoon Conservation Park, in the state's south-east.

== Description ==
The wetlands comprise Mandina Marshes, Mandina Lake, Cortina Lakes, Mrs Whites Lagoon, Caora and South Flagstaff, which form a chain between relict dune systems inland of the Coorong, about 250 km south-east of Adelaide. The water in the wetlands ranges from fresh to saline according to seasonal conditions. The area has a Mediterranean climate with cool, wet winters and warm, dry summers, and with an average annual rainfall of 450–500 mm. Most of the land is owned by Wetlands & Wildlife, a private conservation and land rehabilitation company, with the remainder expected to become the property of the company in due course.

== Fauna ==
=== Birds ===
The site has been identified as an Important Bird Area (IBA) by BirdLife International because it supports over 1% of the world populations of sharp-tailed sandpipers, and sometimes of blue-billed and musk ducks, when water levels are suitable. It also provides habitat for diamond firetails. Other birds of conservation significance present at the wetlands include black-backed and Australasian bitterns, freckled ducks, Australasian shovellers, white-bellied sea-eagles, peregrine falcons, Latham's snipes, Baillon's and spotless crakes, yellow-tailed black cockatoos, southern emu-wrens, chestnut-rumped heathwrens, diamond and beautiful firetails, and black-chinned honeyeaters. The wetlands also support large breeding colonies of several thousand ibises, egrets, spoonbills and cormorants.

== Flora ==
The Ramsa site Coorong has been a special site to many species of bird. It has also been a special site for many plants. In particular, one type of plant which has been found to be the main source of food for the birds is Ruppia tuberosa. The draining and activities made by the European settlers during the colonial days has caused a great impact to the lives of this particular plant along with other aquatic plants that provides a stock for the birds.

=== Other animals ===
The site is home to red-necked wallabies and common wombats at the extreme western limit of their range. Rosenberg's goannas are present. Growling grass frogs and Yarra pygmy perch have been recorded.
