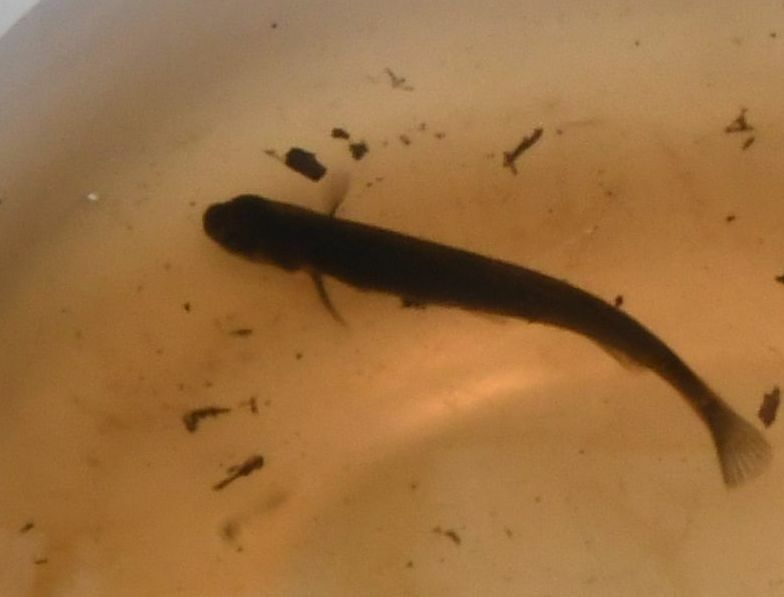

Conservation status
- Endangered (IUCN 3.1)

Scientific classification
- Kingdom: Animalia
- Phylum: Chordata
- Class: Actinopterygii
- Order: Galaxiiformes
- Family: Galaxiidae
- Genus: Galaxiella
- Species: G. nigrostriata

Binomial name
- Galaxiella nigrostriata (Shipway, 1953)
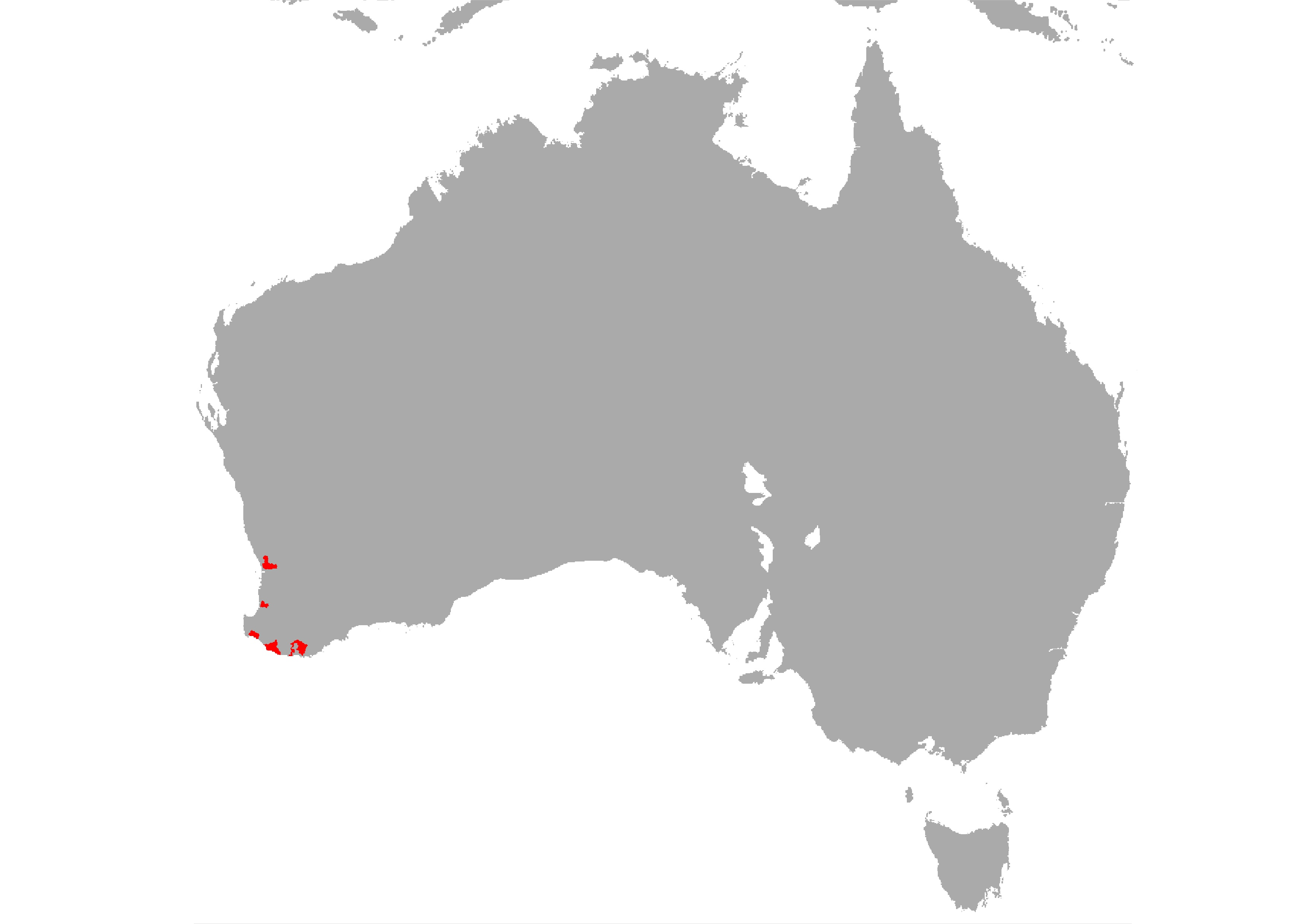

= Black-stripe minnow =

Species of fish

The black-stripe minnow (Galaxiella nigrostriata) is a small freshwater species of fish in the family Galaxiidae. It is endemic to southwestern Australia where it is found in slow-running streams, ponds, swamps and ditches.

== Description ==
Galaxiella nigrostriata males grow to a maximum length of 4.4 centimetres (2 in) and females to a maximum length of 4.8 centimetres (2 in) This species has 7-9 soft dorsal rays and 10-15 soft anal rays. This fish has a silvery-grey colouration with a yellow stripe flanked by black stripes that begins behind the eyes and terminates at the base of the tail.

== Distribution and habitat ==
The black-stripe minnow is found in the South West region of Western Australia between the towns of Augusta and Albany, and from three separate populations near Bunbury, at Melaleuca Park just north of Perth, and at Lake Chandala north of Muchea. Most commonly known to inhabit ephemeral water sources as it is capable of aestivating in summer in the damp substrate. Also found in a range of conditions from slow-flowing rivers, swamps, freshwater lakes and pools, and road side ditches. It can often be found in and around submerged vegetation in lakes and swamps. It can tolerate acidic water that is tannin stained and with a pH as low as 4.5.

== Biology ==
The black-stripe minnow feeds on aquatic insects and their larvae, and micro-crustaceans. Breeding takes place during the rainy season in winter. At this time, the male becomes much more brightly coloured.

== Status ==
The IUCN has listed the black-stripe minnow as being "endangered".
