= Chloroplast capture =

Plant evolutionary process

In plant breeding and evolution, chloroplast capture is a process through which inter-species hybridization and subsequent backcrosses yield a plant with a new combination of nuclear and chloroplast genomes. For instance:

1. Species A's (having chloroplast genome a and nuclear genome AA) pollen hybridizes to species B's (b and BB) ovule, yielding the 1st hybrid (F1) with chloroplast genome b and nuclear genome A (50%) and B (50%);
2. Species A's pollen hybridizes (backcross) to F1's ovule, yielding the 2nd hybrid (F2) with chloroplast genome b and nuclear genome A (75%) and B (25%);
3. Species A's pollen again backcrosses to F2's ovule, yielding the 3rd hybrid (F3) with chloroplast genome b and nuclear genome A (87.5%) and B (12.5%);
4. After further backcross generations, a plant is obtained with the new genetic combination (chloroplast genome b and nuclear genome AA).

== Known cases of chloroplast capture ==
=== Gymnosperm ===
- Juniperus (Cupressaceae)
- Pinus (Pinaceae)

=== Angiosperm ===
- Quercus (Fagaceae)
- Ruppia (Ruppiaceae)
- Heuchera (Saxifragaceae)
