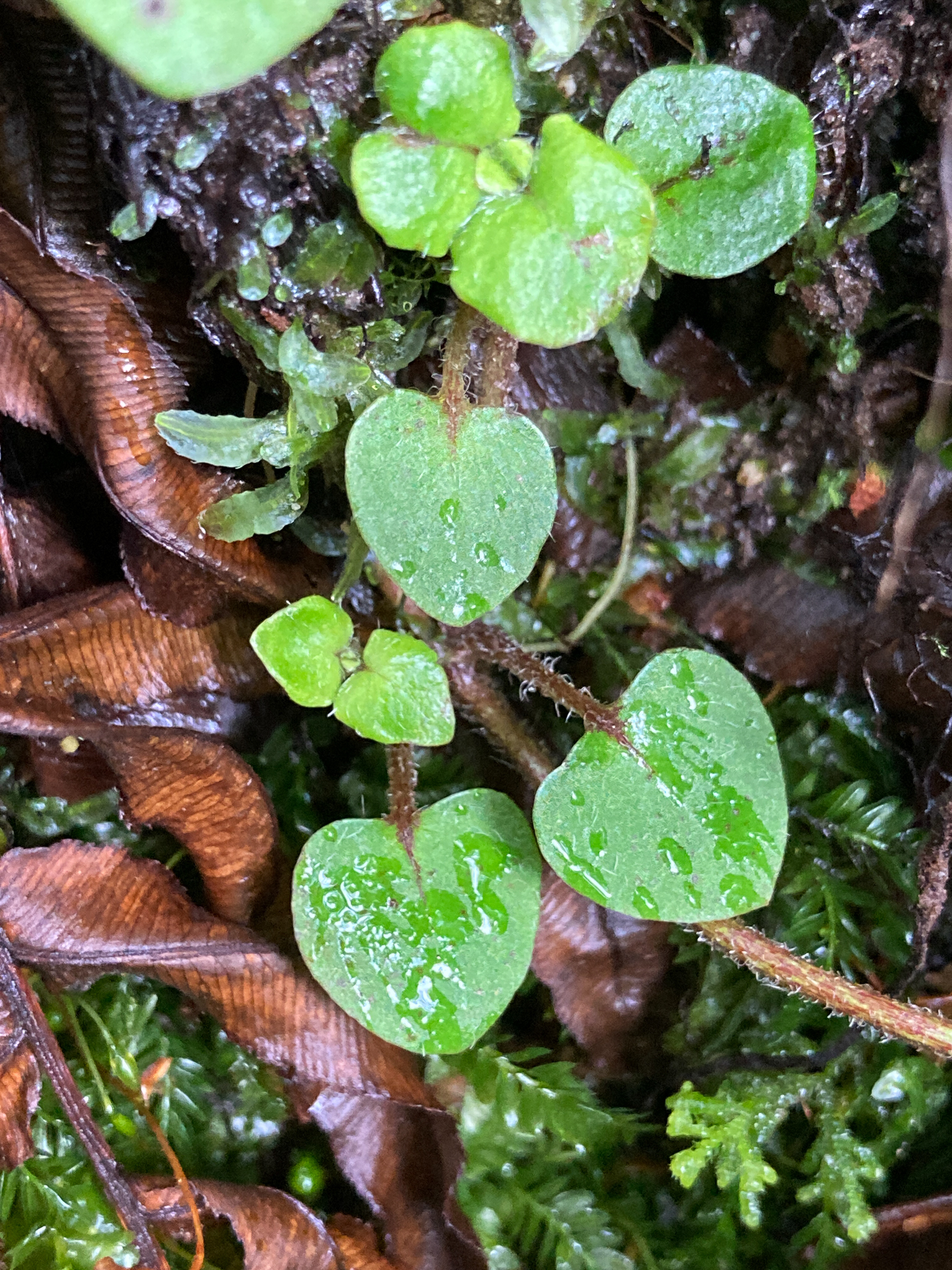
- Nertera villosa in Fiordland

Conservation status
- Not Threatened (NZ TCS)

Scientific classification
- Kingdom: Plantae
- Clade: Embryophytes
- Clade: Tracheophytes
- Clade: Angiosperms
- Clade: Eudicots
- Clade: Asterids
- Order: Gentianales
- Family: Rubiaceae
- Genus: Nertera
- Species: N. villosa

Binomial name
- Nertera villosa B.H.Macmill. & R.Mason

= Nertera villosa =

Species of flowering plant

Nertera villosa, the hairy forest nertera, is a species of flowering plant, endemic to New Zealand.

== Description ==
The species is a small and prostrate herb. Its stems have short, bunched, sub-appressed (laid against other surfaces such as the stem) hairs. The leaves are green and roughly heart-shaped. The fruit is an orange or red drupe.

Flowers are present from August to April.

== Range and habitat ==
This species is found from the lowlands to the mountains in New Zealand, on all of the major islands but scarce in the northern areas of the North Island. In the South Island it is only found up to 600m in elevation, and only up to 450m on Stewart Island.

== Ecology ==
Nertera villosa is resistant to browsing.

== Etymology ==
Villosa means 'hairy' in Latin.

== Taxonomy ==
This species was made available in 1995.
