= George Mack (ornithologist) =

Australian ornithologist

George Mack (2 October 1899, Killearn, Scotland - 24 October 1963, Brisbane, Australia) was mainly a museum ornithologist and collector, but also worked as an ichthyologist.

He migrated from Britain to Western Australia in 1919. He worked at the National Museum of Victoria from 1923 to 1945. During this time, he published a revision of the Australian species of the fairy-wren genus Malurus and described several species of fish, for example Galaxiella pusilla.

Mack then worked at the Queensland Museum from 1945, starting as the senior scientific assistant, becoming director in February 1946 until 1963, the year of his death.

It was his controversial action in shooting a scarlet robin during the Royal Australasian Ornithologists Union (RAOU) campout in Marlo, Victoria in 1935 that catalysed change in the RAOU's attitude to collecting.
