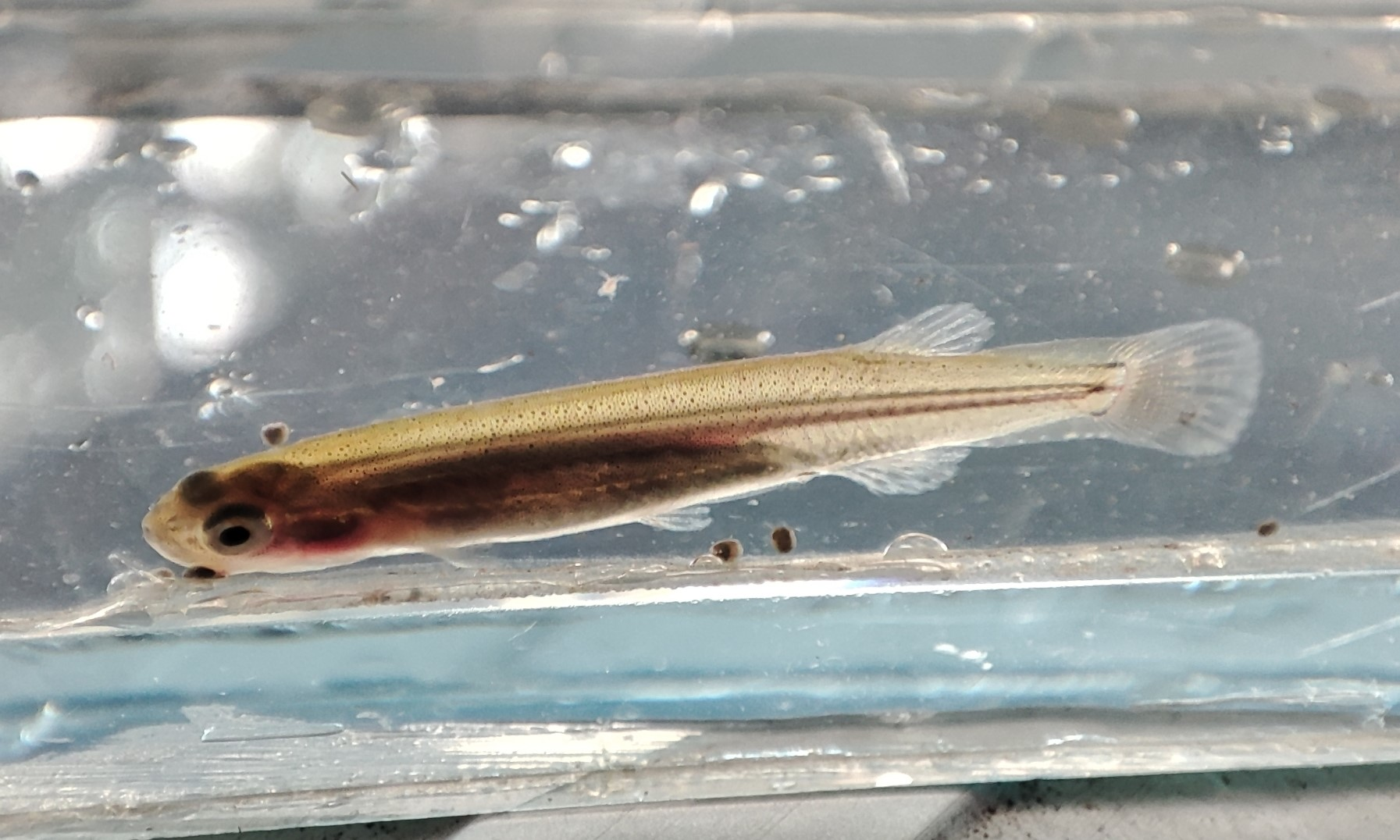

Conservation status
- Endangered (IUCN 3.1)

Scientific classification
- Kingdom: Animalia
- Phylum: Chordata
- Class: Actinopterygii
- Division: Teleostei
- Order: Galaxiiformes
- Family: Galaxiidae
- Genus: Galaxiella
- Species: G. pusilla

Binomial name
- Galaxiella pusilla (Mack, 1936)
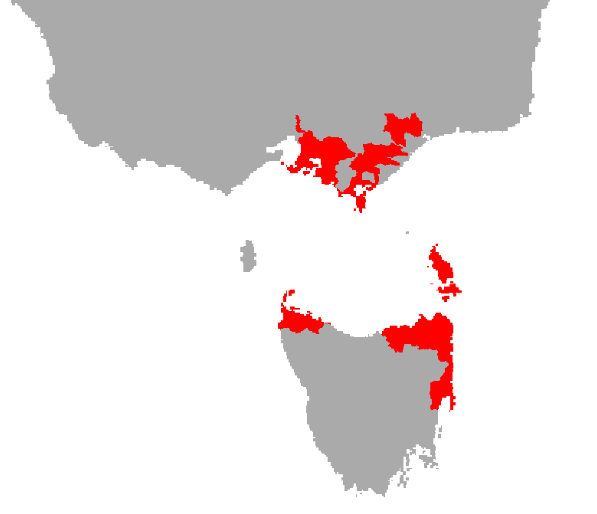

= Galaxiella pusilla =

Dwarf galaxias

Species of ray-finned fish

Galaxiella pusilla, commonly known as dwarf galaxias or eastern dwarf galaxias, is a small species of freshwater fish from the galaxiid family, found only in the southeastern Australian states of Victoria and Tasmania.

The species is officially designated as Endangered on the IUCN Red List.

== Description ==
Galaxiella pusilla is a tiny, slender fish with a scaleless body, soft-rayed fins, and a single dorsal fin positioned well back on the body, like other members of the Galaxiidae family,. The body depth is greatest mid-abdomen, tapering to both head and tail, while the lateral line follows the dorsal profile. The head is short and blunt with large eyes, while the mouth is small, terminal and oblique with jaws roughly equal in length. The dorsal and anal fins are opposite, short-based and rounded. The caudal fin is long and rounded, with fleshy flanges extending forward almost to the bases of the dorsal and anal fins. A fleshy abdominal keel (more pronounced in males) extends from the pelvic fin base posteriorly to the vent. Body colour is olive–amber on the dorsal surface and sides, with a silvery-white belly, while the fins are transparent.

The species is sexually dimorphic with males being smaller and more slender than females, with a maximum length of about 40 mm (1.6 in) for females and 34 mm (1.3 in) for males. It has three longitudinal black stripes along each side of the trunk, and a distinct orange stripe between the mid- and lowest black stripe. The black stripes are less distinct or absent in females.

== Distribution ==
Galaxiella pusilla is now only known to exist in southeastern Victoria from the Mitchell River basin near Bairnsdale in the east to the Melbourne's Dandenong Creek catchment in the west, as well as in northern Tasmania and Flinders Island across the Bass Strait. Distribution of populations is generally disjunct and patchy, due to the nature of the fish's reliance on lowland, shallow, swampy habitats.

== Ecology ==
Galaxiella pusilla spend their entire life cycle in fresh water. They are found in shallow, slow-flowing waterbodies with abundant submerged and emergent aquatic vegetation, and generally prefer to stay close to the shore hidden in vegetation. They are able travel overland between different wetlands if the water is no less than 2 cm (0.79 in) deep connecting the ponds.

At sites where water is temporary or partially dried up, G. pusilla are thought to undertake some form of aestivation, and are only able to do so when the habitat is also populated with Geocharax crayfish, whose burrows are utilized by the fish in dry conditions.

=== Diet ===
Galaxiella pusilla is a generalist carnivore. They have also been seen eating filamentous algae.

=== Reproduction ===
Galaxiella pusilla spawns in late winter to spring, with females lay from 65–250 adhesive eggs, one at a time with approximately 10 eggs laid daily over 7–14 days. The egg size is around 0.6–1.3 mm (0.024–0.051 in), whereas migratory and estuary galaxiids spawn smaller quantities but larger-sized eggs. The eggs are attached usually on the underside of aquatic vegetation or on a hard surface such as a rock or timber. The female may be attended by up to three males, which pass over the eggs to fertilize them, before moving off in search of other spawning females. Larvae hatch after 2–3 weeks and are about 4.5 mm (0.18 in) in length.

== Threat of extinction ==
Although there is no evidence of a reduction in the range of Galaxiella pusilla, the species was almost certainly once more widespread and abundant, but populations have probably been substantially fragmented and depleted historically by wetland drainage and modification. The impact of European settlement and land development upon shallow freshwater wetlands, the preferred habitat of G. pusilla, has been severe with many wetlands having been permanently lost, and much of what remains has been affected by one or more degrading processes, which have been especially severe in shallow wetlands. In Victoria, less than 1% of wetlands previous to European settlement currently exist, and many of this 1% has been altered in some way through increased flows or nutrient flows. Distribution of G. pusilla populations is now generally disjunct and patchy, due to the fragmented nature of the remaining lowland habitats.

Competition from invasive species such as the eastern mosquitofish (Gambusia holbrooki), which is known to feed on eggs and fries as well as display territorial aggression via fin-nipping, and predation by redfin perch (Perca fluviatilis) and brown trout (Salmo trutta) can impact on both G. pusilla and little galaxias (Galaxiella toourtkoourt). The common yabby (Cherax destructor) is also recognised as a problem because it destroys aquatic vegetation and increases turbidity in the water, and has been identified as a noxious species in Tasmania due to its ability to reduce the habitat quality of for native species.

G. pusilla is a short-lived species and probably has poor dispersal ability, and is thus extremely vulnerable to local extinctions. Reduced flooding and loss of habitat linkages greatly reduce the fish's ability to recolonize habitats. The species is thought to have become extirpated at several locations in the last few decades, including Blind, Bruthen, Corhanwarrabul, Langwarren, Little Tea Tree and Watson Creek catchments in Victoria and Marrawah in Tasmania. Several small populations have been established, usually in artificially created wetlands, through translocation. Populations supporting high densities of individuals can still be found in some locations, particularly within the Glenelg and Bunyip River basins in Victoria.
