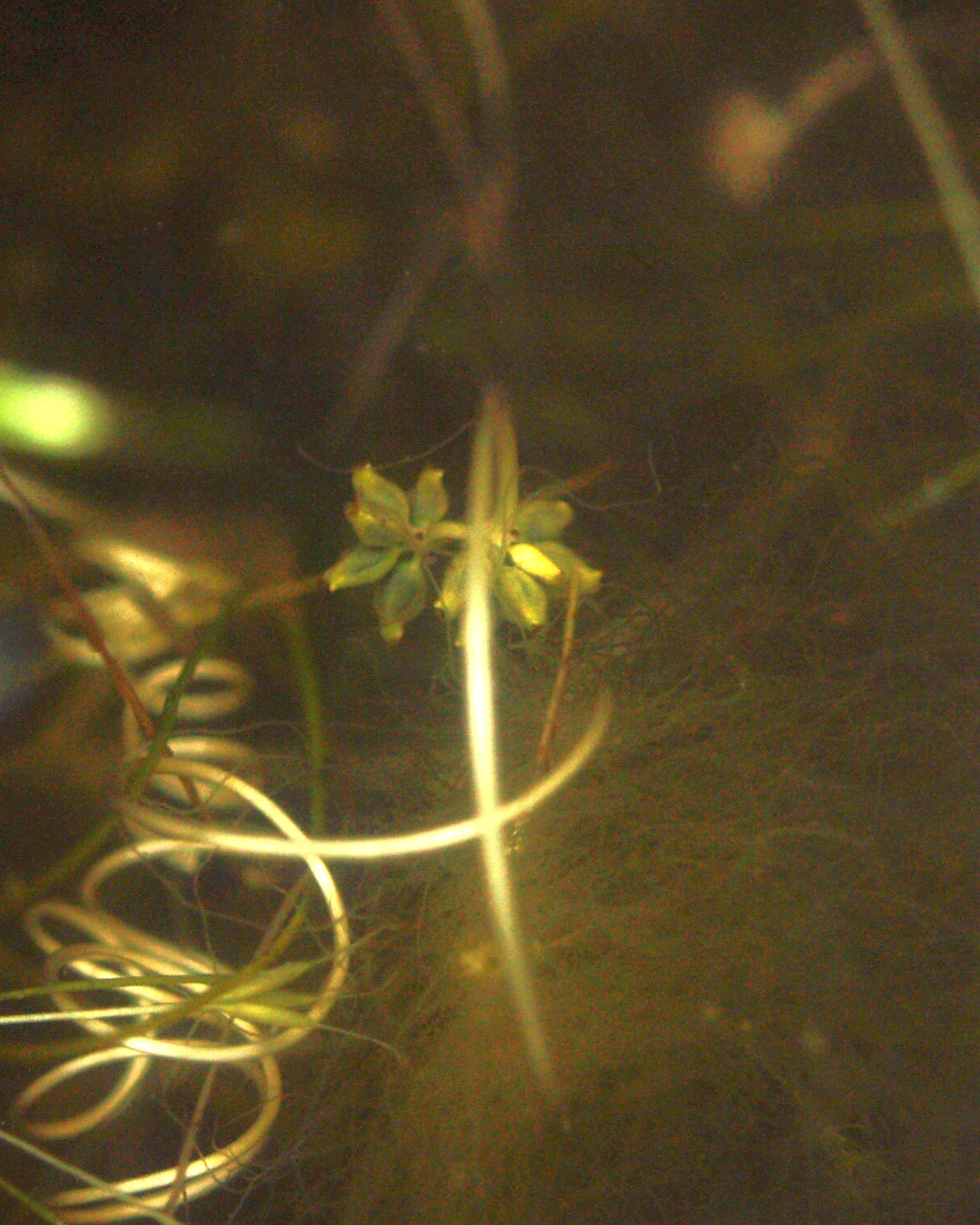

Scientific classification
- Kingdom: Plantae
- Clade: Tracheophytes
- Clade: Angiosperms
- Clade: Monocots
- Order: Alismatales
- Family: Ruppiaceae
- Genus: Ruppia
- Species: R. tuberosa

Binomial name
- Ruppia tuberosa J.S.Davis & Toml.

= Ruppia tuberosa =

Species of herb

Ruppia tuberosa is a submerged herb in the genus Ruppia found in shallow hypersaline waters in Australia.

== Distribution and habitat ==
This is a common submerged herb in Australian coasts, including NSW, SA, Vic, and WA (type locality).

== Description ==
This aquatic herb is one of the early diverged species in the genus.

== Ecology ==
The habitat is up to four times saltier than seawater.
