= Ruppia drepanensis =

Scientific classification
- Kingdom: Plantae
- Clade: Tracheophytes
- Clade: Angiosperms
- Clade: Monocots
- Order: Alismatales
- Family: Ruppiaceae
- Genus: Ruppia
- Species: R. drepanensis

Binomial name
- Ruppia drepanensis Tineo

Species of plant

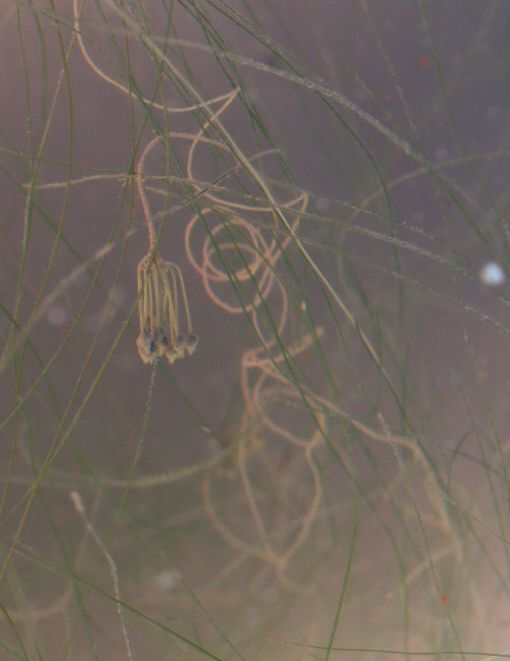
2012 Aquatic plant surveys in the Mediterranean by the Bulletin of Water Plant Society, Japan

Ruppia drepanensis is a genus of flowering plants. It was first described by Vincenzo Tineo. Ruppia drepanensis belongs to the genus Ruppia, and the family Ruppiaceae.

== Native Countries ==
- Morocco
- Algeria
- Tunisia
- Spain
- Italy
- Portugal

== Sources ==
This article incorporates text from a free content work. Licensed under CC0 (license statement/permission). Text taken from Ruppia drepanensis. Encyclopedia of Life.
