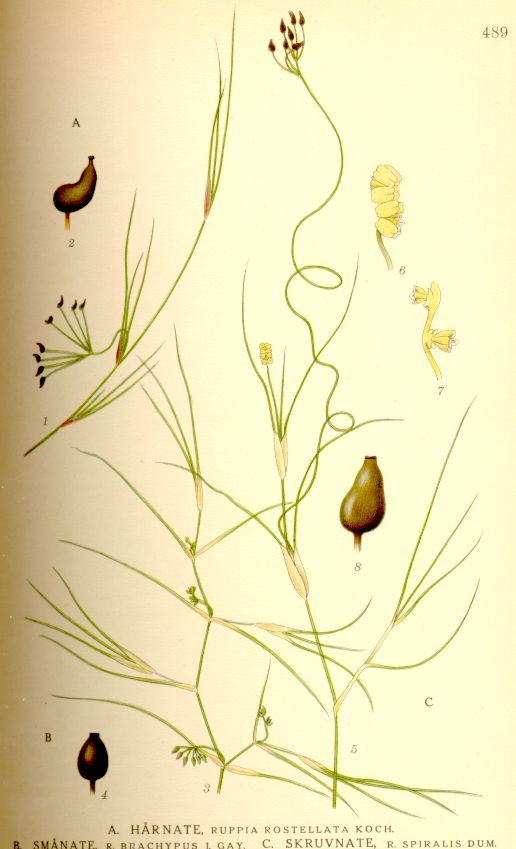
- Ruppia rostellata, R. brachypus, + R. spiralis

Scientific classification
- Kingdom: Plantae
- Clade: Embryophytes
- Clade: Tracheophytes
- Clade: Angiosperms
- Clade: Monocots
- Order: Alismatales
- Family: Ruppiaceae; Horan.
- Genus: Ruppia; L.

Synonyms
- Bucafer Adans.; Buccaferrea P.Micheli ex Petagna; Dzieduszyckia Rehmann

= Ruppia =

Genus of aquatic plants

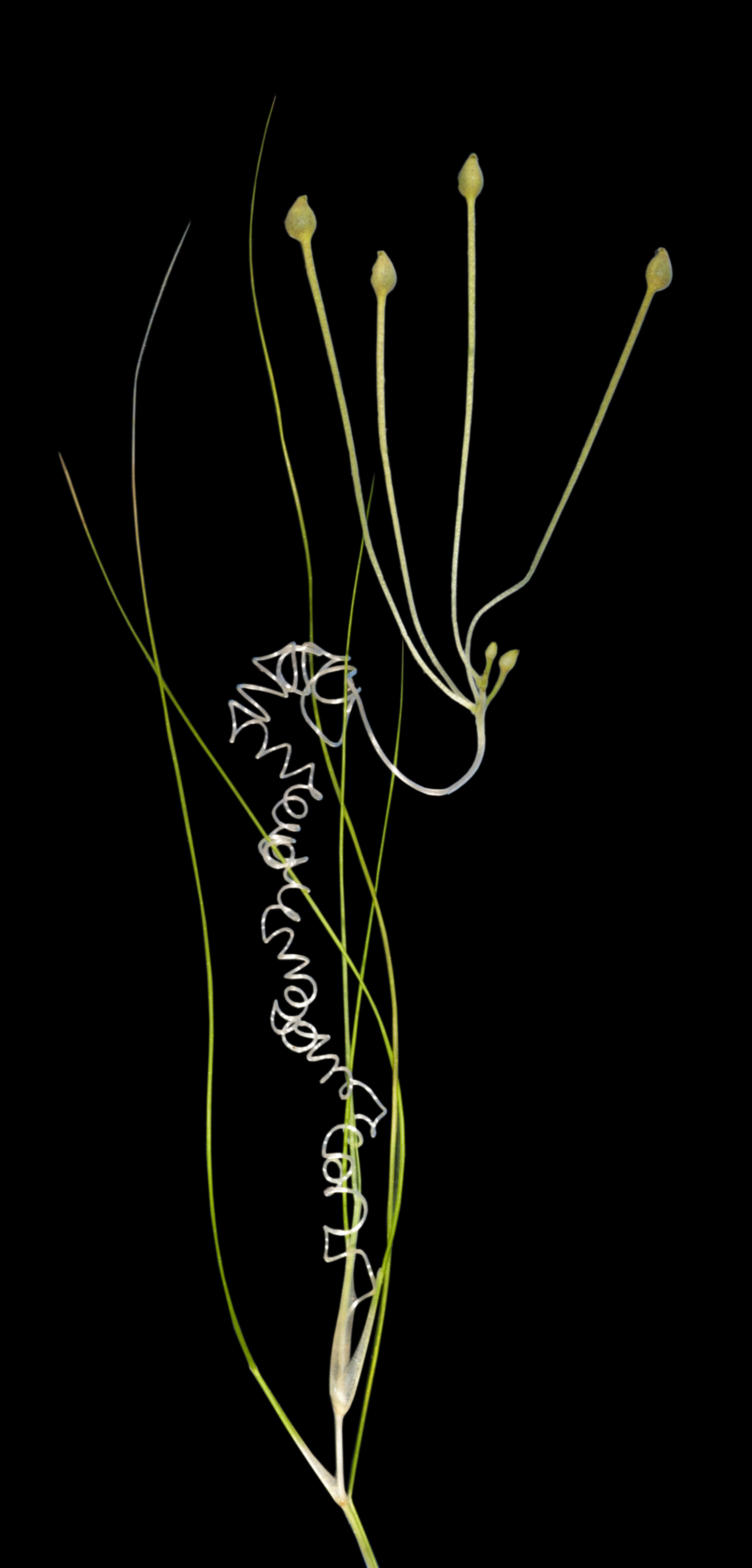
Ruppia polycarpa

Ruppia, also known as the widgeonweeds, ditch grasses or widgeon grass, is the only extant genus in the family Ruppiaceae, with 11 known species. These are aquatic plants widespread over much of the world. The genus name honours Heinrich Bernhard Rupp, a German botanist (1688–1719). They are widespread outside of frigid zones and the tropics.

== Description ==
These plants are aquatic, rhizomatous with roots set in the substratum. They can be annual (commonly) or perennial (rarely); stem growth is conspicuously sympodial, but sometimes is not. These species are adapted to be in brackish water estuaries. The leaves are small or medium-sized. Their disposition can be alternate, opposite, or whorled (usually alternate except when subtending an inflorescence). Even, lamina keep entire and are setaceous or linear. The leaf just shows one vein without cross-venules. Stomata are not present. The mesophyll leaks calcium oxalate crystals. The minor leaf veins do not present phloem transfer cells and leaks vessels.

These plants have stems without secondary thickening and xylem without vessels. The sieve-tube plastids are P-type. The root xylem does not present vessels.

These plants are hermaphroditic, with anemophilous or hydrophilous pollination. The flowers are ebracteate, small, and regular. Commonly, the flowers are aggregated in ‘inflorescences’, but sometimes they are solitary. Often, they grow in racemes, spikes, or umbels. The scapiflorous inflorescences are terminal, in short spikes, or subumbelliform racemes, sometimes one- or few-flowered. They do not have hypogynous disks. These flowers do not have perianth, except when small staminal appendages are regarded as perianth segments. The androecial members are all equal. The androecium just presents two fertile stamens with sessile anthers dehiscing by longitudinal slits. The pollen is polysiphonous and its grains are three-celled and nonaperturate. The gynoecium (2–)4(−16) is superior, carpelled, and euapocarpous. The carpel is not stylate, apically stigmatic with the stigma peltate, or umbonate. These flowers only present one ovule pendulous, nonarillate, campylotropous, bitegmic, and crassinucellate. The placentation is apical and embryo-sac development is of the polygonum type. Before fertilization, they fuse polar nuclei. The fruit is drupaceous and fleshy, forming an aggregate. The fruiting carpel is indehiscent, commonly on a long, spirally twisted peduncle, with each drupelet becoming very long-stalked. The fruit contains one nonendospermic seed with starch. The embryo can be straight or slightly curved. Membranous testa do not have phytomelan.

== Species ==
11 species are accepted.

- Ruppia bicarpa Yu Ito & Muasya – Western Cape, South Africa
- Ruppia brevipedunculata Shuo Yu & Hartog – China (Jiangsu)
- Ruppia cirrhosa (Petagna) Grande (synonym Ruppia spiralis) – temperate regions: Europe, Asia, north + south (but not tropical) Africa, North America, West Indies, Argentina. The name is a homotypic synonym of R. maritima.
- Ruppia didyma Sw. ex Wikstr. – Mexico, West Indies
- Ruppia drepanensis Tineo – western and central Mediterranean
- Ruppia filifolia (Phil.) Skottsb. – southern South America, Falkland Islands
- Ruppia maritima L. – seashores and lakeshores around the world
- Ruppia megacarpa R.Mason – Australia, New Zealand, Asia (Korea, Japan, and Russia)
- Ruppia polycarpa R.Mason – Australia, New Zealand (including Chatham Islands)
- Ruppia sinensis Shuo Yu & Hartog – China (Jiangsu)
- Ruppia tuberosa J.S.Davis & Toml. – Australia

== Taxonomy ==
The Cronquist system of 1981 placed the family in order Najadales of subclass Alismatidae in class Liliopsida [=monocotyledons] in division Magnoliophyta [=angiosperms].

The APG II system of 2003 (unchanged from the APG system of 1998) does recognize such a family and places it in the order Alismatales, in the clade monocots.

According to the AP-Website the family is doubtfully distinct from the family Cymodoceaceae: the plants in the three families Cymodoceaceae, Posidoniaceae, and Ruppiaceae form a monophyletic group. A genus-level taxonomy was briefly revised by Zhao and Wu in 2008.

Marine grasses families: Zosteraceae, Cymodoceaceae, Ruppiaceae and Posidoniaceae. Related families: Potamogetonaceae, Zannichelliaceae (not consistently).

Families and genera crosses (sea grasses)
Kubitzki (ed. 1998)	Watson & Dallwitz (delta-intkey)	data.kew	APWeb (mobot.org)
Zosteraceae
1. Zostera L.	Zostera	Zostera L.	Zostera L. (including Heterozostera den Hartog, Macrozostera Tomlinson & Posluzny, Nanozostera Tomlinson & Posluzny, Zosterella J. K. Small)
2. Heterozostera den Hartog	Heterozostera	Heterozostera (Setch.) Hartog	(in Zostera)
3. Phyllospadix Hook.	Phyllospadix	Phyllospadix Hook.	Phyllospadix J. D. Hooker
Cymodoceaceae
1. Syringodium Kütz	Syringodium	Syringodium Kutz.	(in Cymodocea)
2. Halodule Endl.	Halodule	Halodule Endl.	Halodule Endlicher
3. Cymodocea König	Cymodocea	Cymodocea K.Koenig (including Phycoschoenus (Asch.) Nakai )	Cymodocea König (including Amphibolis Agardh ?, Syringodium Kütz. ?, Thalassodendron den Hartog ?)
4. Amphibolis Agardh	Amphibolis	Amphibolis C.Agardh (including Pectinella J.M.Black)	(in Cymodocea)
5. Thalassodendron de Hartog	(name not found)	Thalassodendron Hartog	(in Cymodocea)
Ruppiaceae
Ruppia L.	Ruppia	(in Ruppia L. in Potamogetonaceae)	Ruppia L.
Posidoniaceae
Posidonia König	Posidonia	Posidonia K.Koenig	Posidonia König

Families and genera crosses (Potamogetonaceae)
Kubitzki (ed. 1998)	Watson & Dallwitz (delta-intkey)	data.kew	APWeb (mobot.org)
Potamogetonaceae
1. Potamogeton L.	Potamogeton	Potamogeton L.	Potamogeton L. (including Coleogeton Les & Haynes, Stuckenia Börner)
2. Groenlandia J. Gray	Groenlandia	Groenlandia J.Gay	Groenlandia J. Gay
(in Ruppia in Ruppiaceae)	(in Ruppia in Ruppiaceae)	Ruppia L.	(in Ruppia in Ruppiaceae)
(in Althenia: Zannichelliaceae and Lepilaena: Zannichelliaceae)	(in Althenia: Zannichelliaceae and Lepilaena: Zannichelliaceae)	(in Althenia F.Petit: Zannichelliaceae and Lepilaena J.L.Drumm. ex Harv.:Zannichelliaceae)	Althenia Petit (including Lepilaena Harvey)
(in Pseudalthenia including Vleisia: Zannichelliaceae)	(in Pseudalthenia: Zannichelliaceae and Vleisia: Zannichelliaceae)	(Pseudalthenia not found, Vleisia Toml. & Posl.: Zannichelliaceae)	Pseudalthenia Nakai (including Vleisia Tomlinson & Posluszny)
(in Zannichellia L.: Zannichelliaceae)	(in Zannichellia: Zannichelliaceae)	(in Zannichellia L.: Zannichelliaceae)	Zannichellia L.
Zannichelliaceae
1. Zannichellia L.	Zannichellia	Zannichellia L.	(in Zannichellia L.: Potamogetonaceae)
2. Pseudalthenia Nakai (including Vleisia)	Pseudalthenia (excluding Vleisia)	(name not found)	(in Pseudalthenia: Potamogetonaceae)
3. Althenia Petit (excluding Lepilaena Drumm. ex. Harv.)	Althenia (excluding Lepilaena)	Althenia F.Petit (excluding Lepilaena J.L.Drumm. ex Harv.)	Althenia Petit (including Lepilaena Harvey)
4. Lepilaena Drumm. ex. Harv.	Lepilaena	Lepilaena J.L.Drumm. ex Harv.	(in Althenia Petit)
(in Pseudalthenia)	Vleisia	Vleisia Toml. & Posl.	(in Pseudalthenia: Potamogetonaceae)

== Phylogeny and evolution ==
The first molecular phylogeny of the monogeneric family discerned three distinct species, R. tuberosa, R. megacarpa, and R. polycarpa, and one species complex comprising six lineages. The species complex, named R. maritima complex, was later updated as a group of eight lineages. These studies revealed that multiple hybridization and polyploidy events as well as chloroplast capture have occurred in the evolution of the genus.

== Phytochemistry ==
These plants present an anatomy non-C4 type. Seven labdanes have been identified from this genus:

- ent-14,15-Dinor-8(17)-labden-13-one
- Methyl ester of (ent-12S)-15,16-Epoxy-12-hydroxy-12-oxo-8(17),13(16),14-labdatrien-19-oic acid.
- (-)-15,16-epoxy-8(17),13(16),14-labdatrien-19-ol.
- Methyl ester of (-)-15,16-epoxy-8(17),13(16),14-labdatrien-19-oic acid.
- (-)-15,16-Epoxy-8(17),13(16),14-labdatrien-19-al.
- (-)-15,16-Epoxy-8(17),13(16),14-labdatrien-19-yl acetate
- (ent-13E)-8(17),13-Labdadien-15-ol

Three steroids have been also isolated:

- (3β,5α,6β,7α,22E,24R)-Ergosta-8(14),22-diene-3,6,7-triol.
- (3β,5α,6β,7α,22E,24R)-Ergosta-8,22-diene-3,6,7-triol
- (24R)-Ergost-4-ene-3,6-dione.
