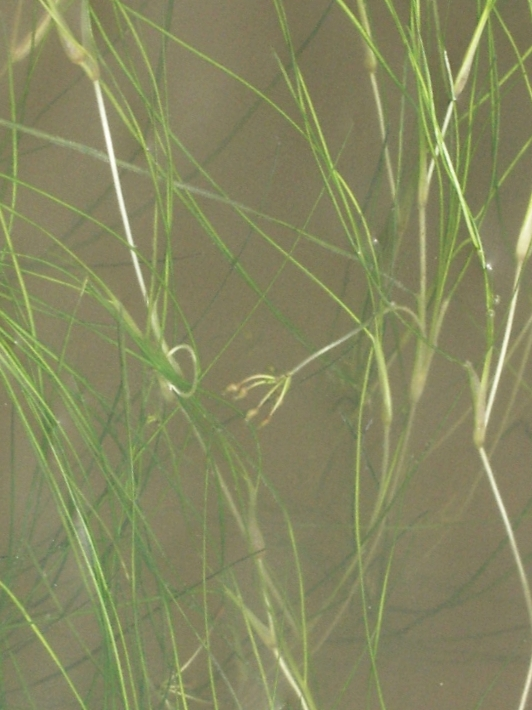
- Ruppia maritima

Conservation status
- Least Concern (IUCN 3.1)

Scientific classification
- Kingdom: Plantae
- Clade: Embryophytes
- Clade: Tracheophytes
- Clade: Spermatophytes
- Clade: Angiosperms
- Clade: Monocots
- Order: Alismatales
- Family: Ruppiaceae
- Genus: Ruppia
- Species: R. maritima

Binomial name
- Ruppia maritima L.

Synonyms
- Ruppia brachypus J.Gay

= Ruppia maritima =

Species of aquatic plant

Ruppia maritima is an aquatic plant species commonly known as beaked tasselweed, beaked ditchgrass, ditch grass, tassel pondweed and widgeon grass. Despite its scientific name, it is not a marine plant; is perhaps best described as a salt-tolerant freshwater species. The generic name Ruppia was dedicated by Linnaeus to the German botanist Heinrich Bernhard Ruppius (1689–1719) and the specific name (maritima) translates to "of the sea".

== Distribution ==
It can be found throughout the world, most often in coastal areas, where it grows in brackish water bodies, such as marshes. It is a dominant plant in a great many shoreline regions. It does not grow well in turbid water or low-oxygen substrates.

== Description ==
Ruppia maritima is a thread-thin, grasslike annual or perennial herb which grows from a rhizome anchored shallowly in the wet substrate. It produces a long, narrow, straight or loosely coiled inflorescence tipped with two tiny flowers. The plant often self-pollinates, but the flowers also release pollen that reaches other plants as it floats away on bubbles.

The fruits are drupelets. They are dispersed in the water and inside the digestive system of fish and waterbirds that eat them. The plant also reproduces vegetatively by sprouting from its rhizome to form colonies.

== Taxonomy and nomenclature ==
On the basis of molecular phylogenetic analyses, a species complex, named R. maritima complex, had been discerned, which was then extended to include eight lineages, or nine lineages.

A lectotype for R. cirrhosa is designated and the name is shown to be a homotypic synonym of R. maritima.

== Wetlands and wildlife ==
This plant and the epiphytic algae attached to the floating leaves can be an important part of the diet for selected herbivorous waterfowl species, but not important for predatory waterfowl that eat fish or invertebrate animals. In many areas, wetlands restoration begins with the recovery and protection of this plant. By being planted in tandem with Zostera marina in sections unsuitable for Zostera, R. maritima can synergistically assist in wetland restoration and combating climate change.

== See also ==
- Wetland indicator status
- Wetland conservation
- Wetland classification
- Constructed wetland
