= Phragmites australis =

Common reed
- Common reed flowerhead in Sweden

Conservation status
- Least Concern (IUCN 3.1)

Scientific classification
- Kingdom: Plantae
- Clade: Tracheophytes
- Clade: Angiosperms
- Clade: Monocots
- Clade: Commelinids
- Order: Poales
- Family: Poaceae
- Genus: Phragmites
- Species: P. australis

Binomial name
- Phragmites australis (Cav.) Trin. ex Steud.

Synonyms
- Arundo phragmites L.; Phragmites phragmites (L.) H.Karst., nom. inval.; Arundo australis Cav.

Species of grass commonly known as reed

Phragmites australis, the common reed, is a species of flowering plant in the grass family Poaceae. It is a wetland grass that can grow up to 2–6 metres (7–20 ft) tall and has a cosmopolitan distribution worldwide.

== Description ==
Phragmites australis commonly forms extensive stands (known as reed beds), which can cover huge areas, an example being in the Danube Delta, where it covers 1,700 square kilometres (170,000 ha) in area. It can grow in damp ground, in standing water up to 1 m (3 ft 3 in) deep, or as a floating mat.

The erect stems grow to 1.5–4 m (4.9–13.1 ft) tall, occasionally to 6 m (20 ft), with the tallest plants growing in areas with hot summers and fertile growing conditions. Where conditions are suitable it can also spread at 5 metres (16 feet) or more per year by horizontal runners, which put down roots at regular intervals. The stems (culms) are typically 5–10 mm broad. The leaves are 18–60 centimetres (7.1–23.6 in) long and 1–3 cm (0.39–1.18 in) broad, occasionally up to 5 cm (2.0 in) broad, glaucous green to greyish-green, fading to buff-brown in autumn before falling to leave the stems standing through the winter. The flowers are produced in late summer in a dense, dark purple panicle, 15–50 cm (6–19 1/2 in) long. Later the numerous long, narrow, sharp pointed spikelets appear greyer due to the growth of long, silky hairs. These eventually help disperse the minute seeds.

== Taxonomy ==
Four subspecies are accepted by the Plants of the World Online database:

- Phragmites australis subsp. americanus Saltonst., P.M.Peterson & Soreng — North America, widespread except for southeastern United States.
- Phragmites australis subsp. australis — Europe, Asia, Africa, Australia, widespread except for tropical Africa and tropical southeast Asia.
- Phragmites australis subsp. berlandieri (E.Fourn.) Saltonst. & Hauber — southern United States to Central America, northern, western and southern South America.
- Phragmites australis subsp. isiacus (Arcang.) J.H.Xue, Chepinoga & K.P.Ma — northern half of Africa, Mediterranean region, southwest to central Asia, and (disjunct) eastern Asia.

Phragmites australis subsp. australis is additionally introduced and invasive in North America, where it outcompetes the native subsp. americanus, and also in New Zealand and locally in Brazil. Morphological distinctions between subspecies australis and subspecies americanus include the shorter ligules of up to 0.9 mm of subsp. australis as opposed to over 1 mm in subsp. americanus, and shorter glumes mostly under 3.2 mm against mostly over 3.2 mm (although there is some overlap in this character), and in culm characteristics. Some authors treat the American subspecies as a distinct species, Phragmites americanus (Saltonst., P.M.Peterson & Soreng) A.Haines.

== Ecology ==
A lake shore in Hanko, Finland dominated by Phragmites australis reeds

It is a helophyte (aquatic plant) occurring in shallow water in ponds, lakes, rivers, fens, ditches, and similar habitats, and it also tolerates brackish water in estuaries and lagoons, and on other wetlands (such as grazing marsh) which are occasionally inundated by the sea.

Common reed is important in wildlife conservation, as it is a keystone species creating a unique habitat on which numerous other species depend. Reedbeds of over 25 hectares are particularly valuable to some larger species such as Eurasian bittern, western marsh harrier, and great reed warbler; the huge 1,700 km² Danube Delta reedbeds are one of the most important wildlife sites in the whole of Europe.

Common reed is suppressed where it is grazed intensively by livestock, reduced to small shoots within the grassland sward, or it disappearing altogether. Limited regulated grazing is however beneficial, as it opens up denser stands and allows for the rejuvenation of the reeds and also a more diverse flora and fauna.

Some birds largely or totally dependent on Phragmites australis reedbeds (all birds shown are on or over common reeds):

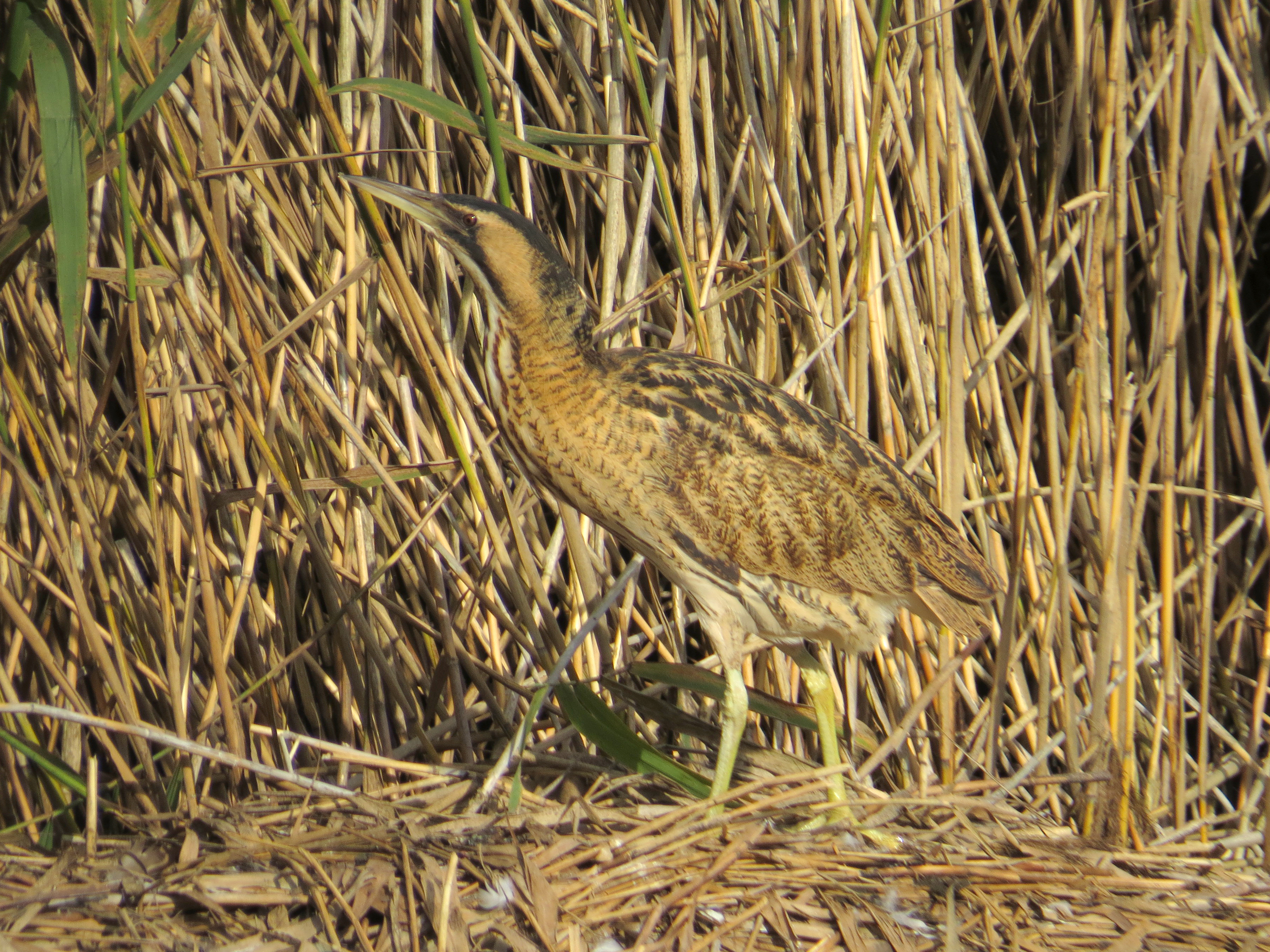
Eurasian bittern Botaurus stellaris

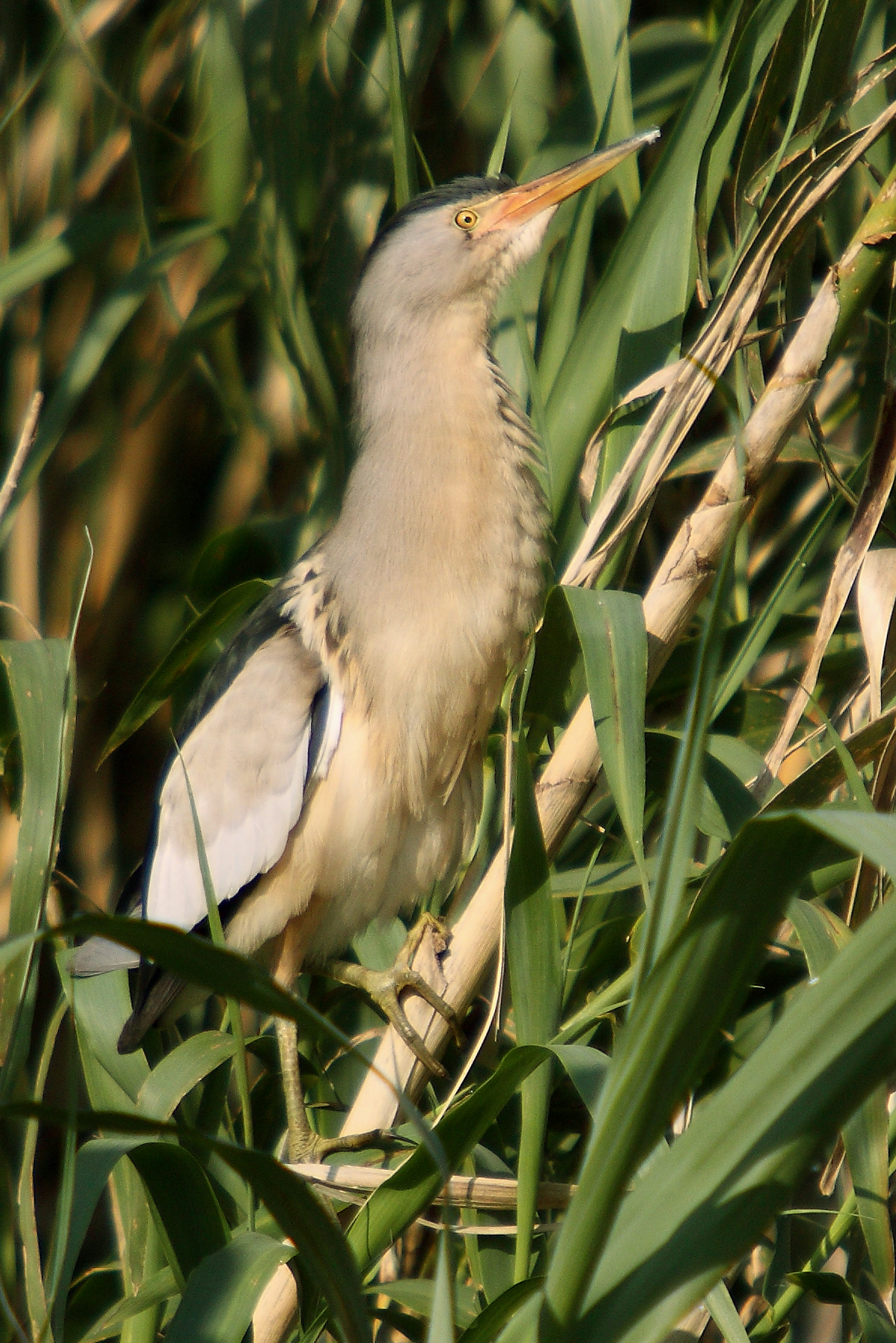
Little bittern Botaurus minutus

Purple heron Ardea purpurea – typically breeds in reedbeds

Dalmatian pelican Pelecanus crispus – the nests are usually in reedbeds, and built with reeds

Little crake Zapornia parva

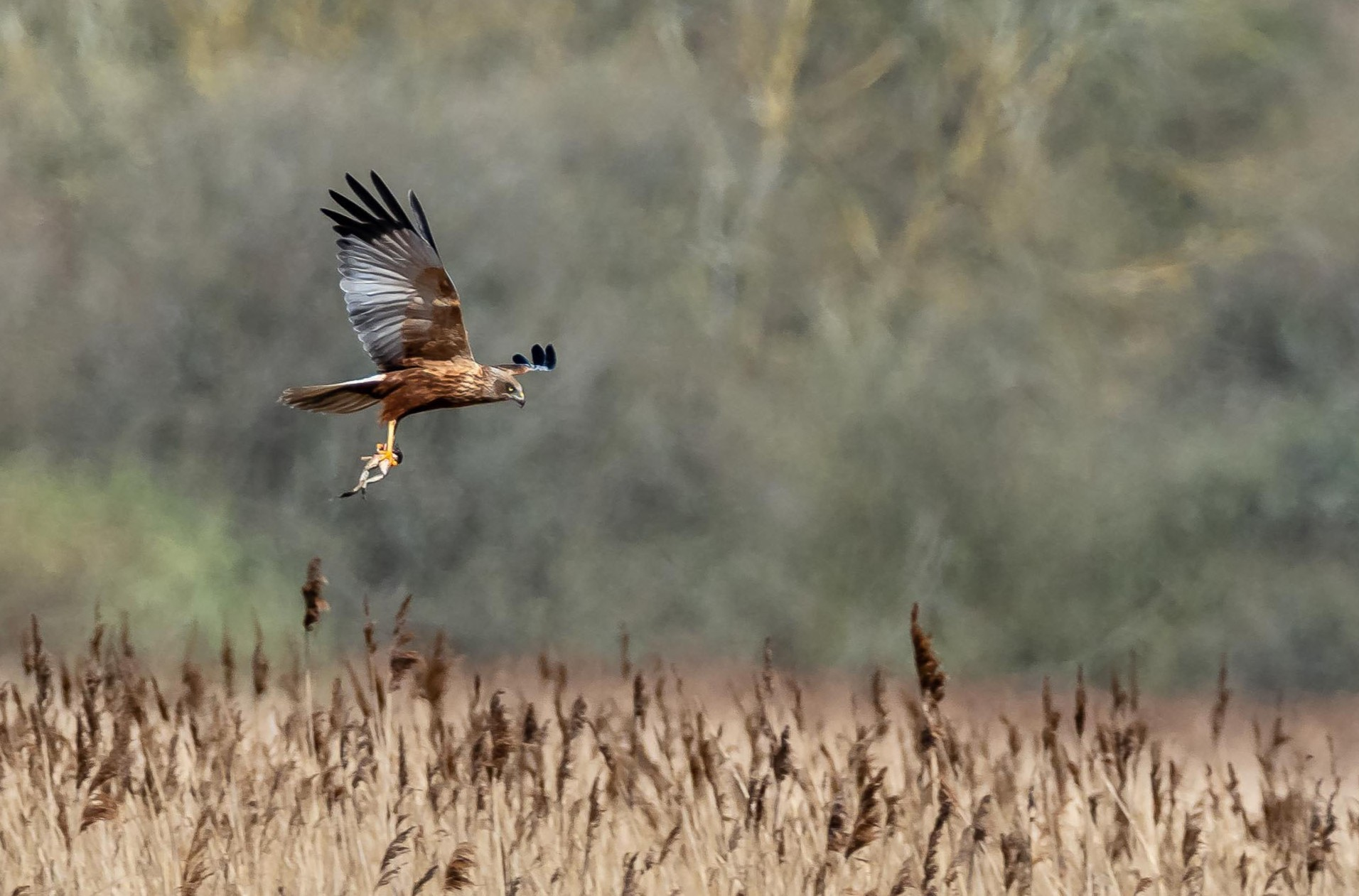
Western marsh harrier Circus aeruginosus

Bearded reedling Panurus biarmicus – an obligate reedbed species, occurring nowhere else

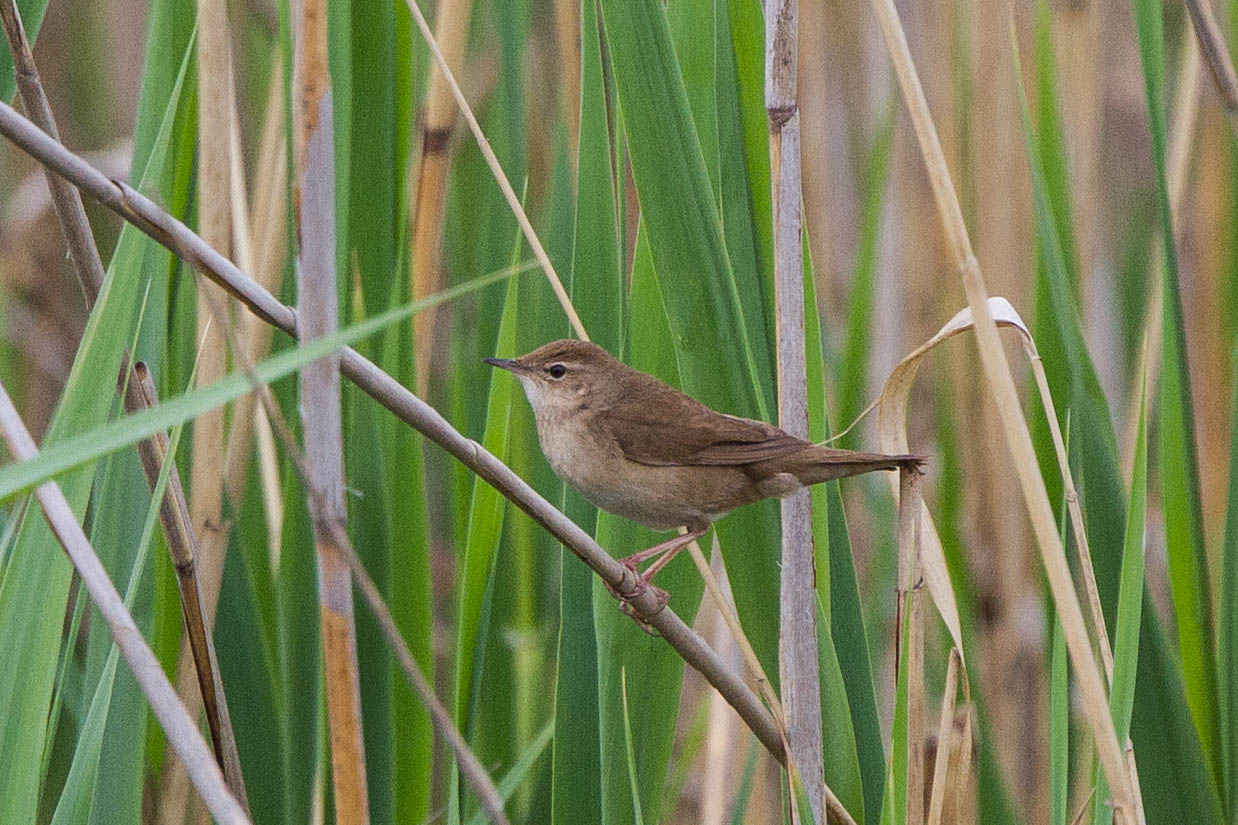
Savi's warbler Locustella luscinioides

Oriental reed warbler Acrocephalus orientalis

Australian reed warbler Acrocephalus australis

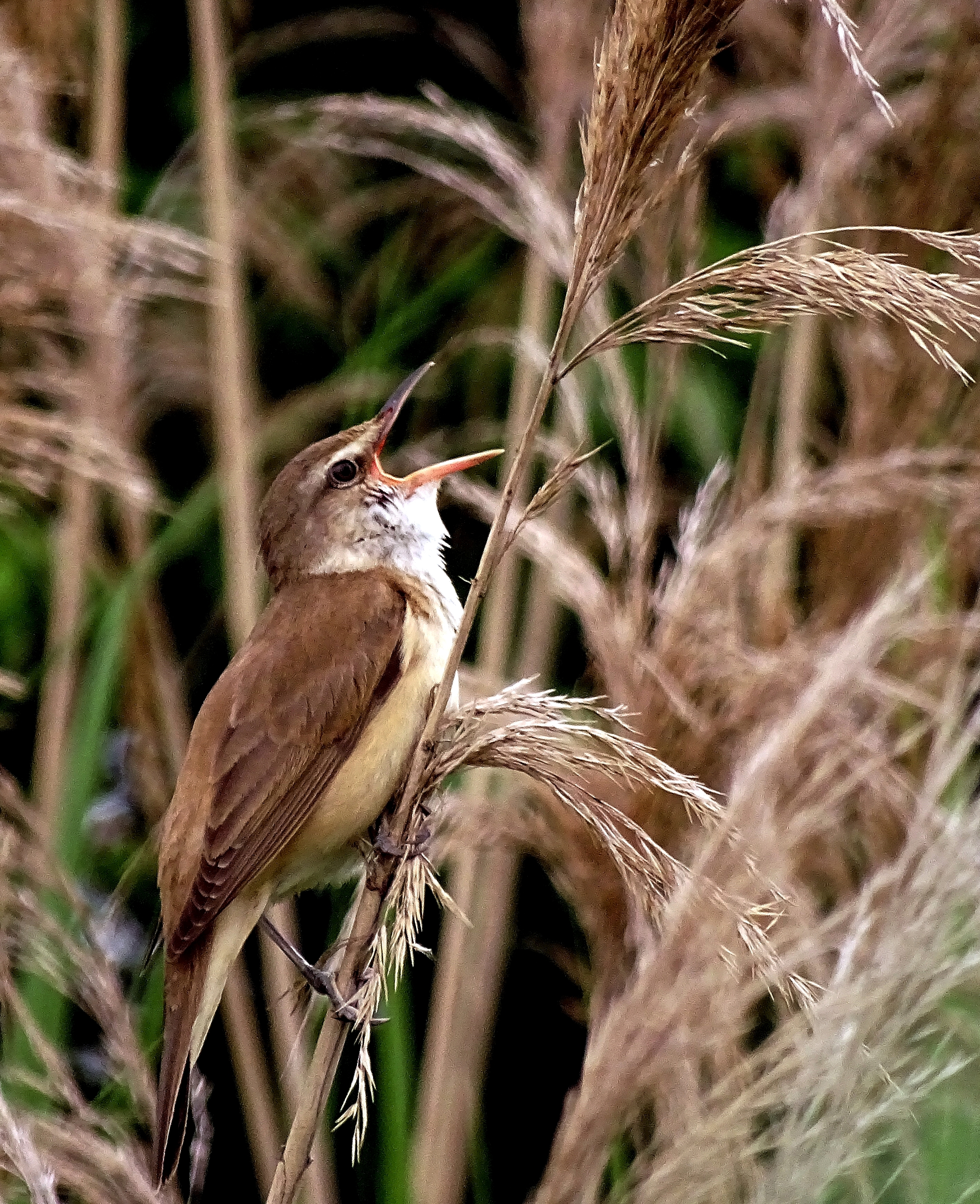
Great reed warbler Acrocephalus arundinaceus

Common reed warbler Acrocephalus scirpaceus

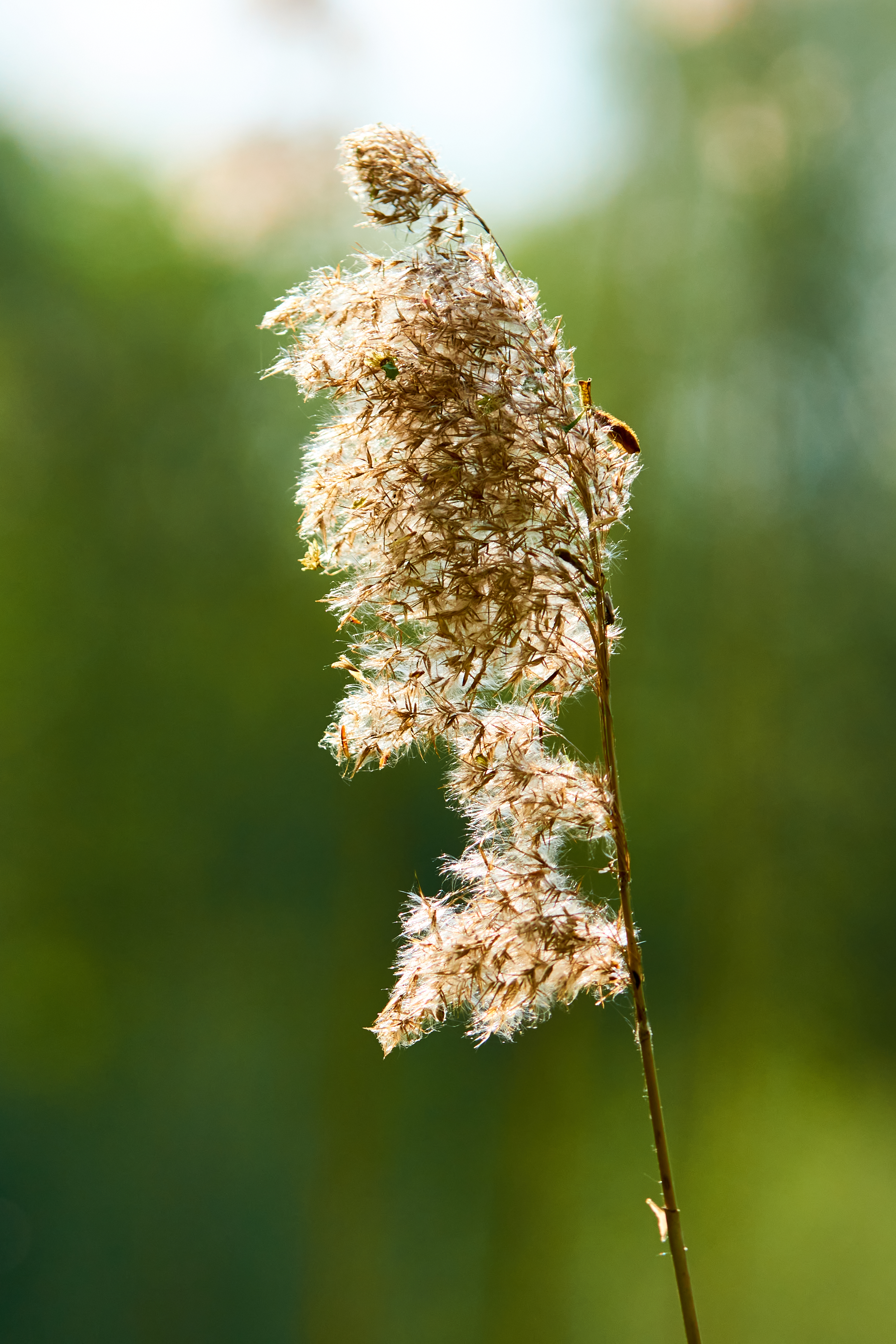
Seedhead in winter

=== Invasive status ===
In North America, the status of Phragmites australis was a source of confusion and debate. It was commonly considered a non-native and often invasive species, introduced from Europe in the 1800s. However, there is evidence of the existence of Phragmites as a native plant in North America long before European colonisation of the continent. The North American subspecies, P. a. subsp. americanus is markedly less vigorous than European subspecies. The expansion of Phragmites in North America is due to the more vigorous, but similar-looking, European subsp. australis. Phragmites australis subsp. australis outcompetes North American native vegetation and lowers the local plant biodiversity. It forms dense thickets of vegetation that are unsuitable habitat for native fauna. It displaces native plants species such as wild rice, Typha, and native orchids. Phragmites has a high above ground biomass that blocks light to other plants allowing areas to turn into Phragmites monoculture very quickly. Decomposing Phragmites increases the rate of marsh accretion more rapidly than would occur with native marsh vegetation.

Phragmites australis subsp. australis is causing serious problems for many other North American hydrophyte wetland plants, including the native P. australis subsp. americanus. Gallic acid released by phragmites is degraded by ultraviolet light to produce mesoxalic acid, effectively hitting susceptible plants and seedlings with two harmful toxins. Phragmites is so difficult to control that one of the most effective methods of eradicating the plant is to burn it over 2–3 seasons. The roots grow so deep and strong that one burn is not enough. Ongoing research suggests that goats could be effectively used to control the species. A study demonstrated that P. australis has similar greenhouse gas emissions to Spartina alterniflora, a plant native to the Atlantic coast of the Americas. However, other studies have demonstrated that it is associated with larger methane emissions and greater carbon dioxide uptake than native New England salt marsh vegetation that occurs at higher marsh elevations.

=== Natural enemies ===
Since 2017, over 80% of the beds of Phragmites in the Pass a Loutre Wildlife Management Area have been damaged by the invasive roseau cane scale (Nipponaclerda biwakoensis), threatening wildlife habitat throughout the affected regions of the area. While typically considered a noxious weed, in Louisiana the reed beds are considered critical to the stability of the shorelines of wetland areas and waterways of the Mississippi River Delta, and the die-off of reed beds is believed to accelerate coastal erosion.

== Uses ==
Common reed is the primary source of thatch for traditional roof thatching in Europe and beyond. The plant is extensively used in phytoremediation, or natural water treatment systems, since the root hairs are excellent at filtering out impurities in waste water. It also shows excellent potential as a source of biomass.

Stems can be made into eco-friendly drinking straws. Many parts of the plant can be eaten. The young shoots can be consumed raw or cooked. The hardened sap from damaged stems can be eaten fresh or toasted. The stems can be dried, ground, sifted, hydrated, and toasted like marshmallows. The seeds can be crushed, mixed with berries and water, and cooked to make a gruel. The roots can be prepared similar to those of cattails.
