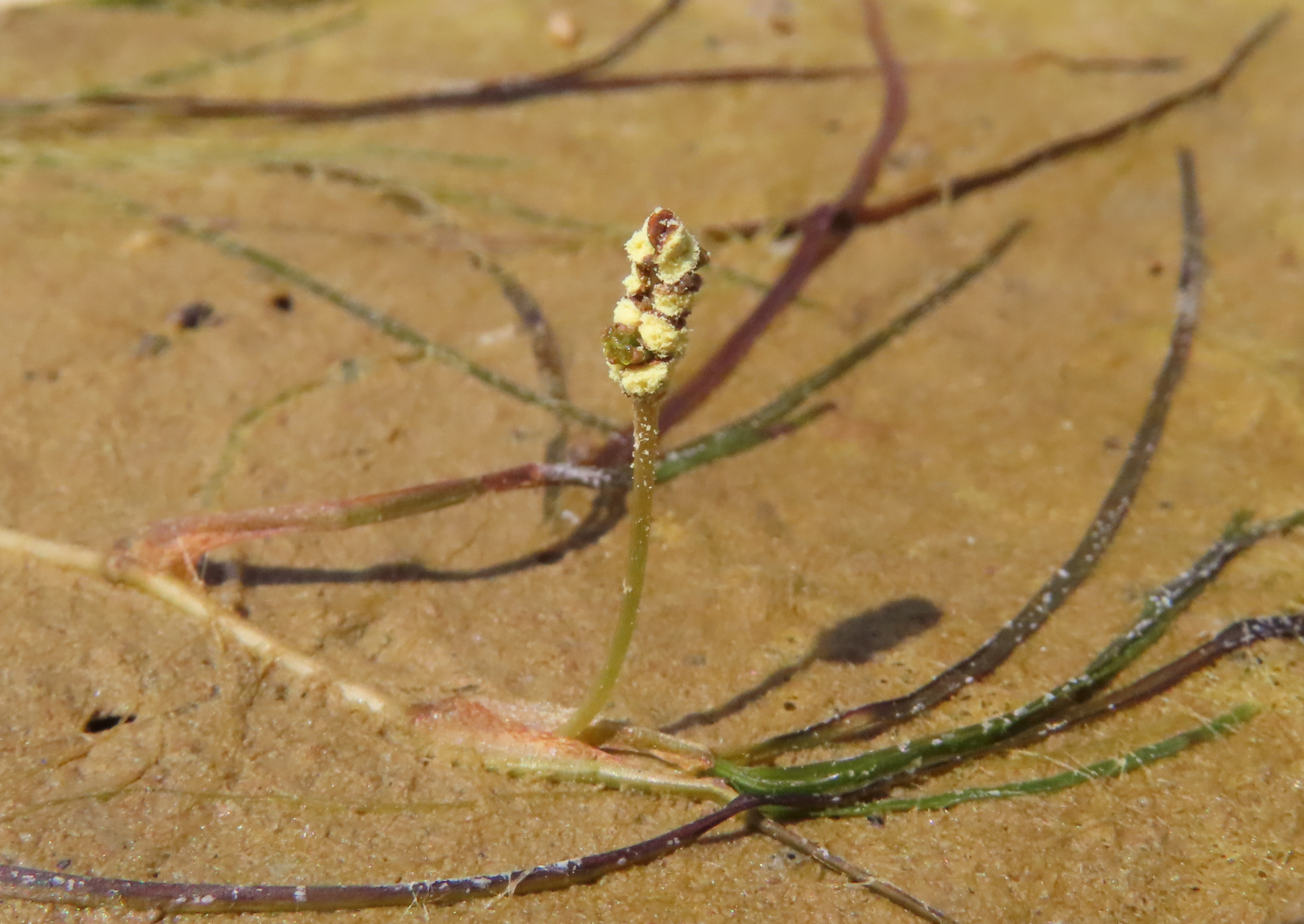

Conservation status
- Least Concern (IUCN 3.1)

Scientific classification
- Kingdom: Plantae
- Clade: Tracheophytes
- Clade: Angiosperms
- Clade: Monocots
- Order: Alismatales
- Family: Ruppiaceae
- Genus: Ruppia
- Species: R. cirrhosa

Binomial name
- Ruppia cirrhosa (Petagna) Grande

Synonyms
- List: Buccaferrea cirrhosa Petagna (1787) (basionym); Dzieduszyckia limnobis Rehmann; Ruppia cirrhosa subsp. occidentalis (S.Watson) Á.Löve & D.Löve; Ruppia cirrhosa var. truncatifolia (Miki) H.Hara; Ruppia lacustris Macoun; Ruppia maritima var. occidentalis (S.Watson) Graebn.; Ruppia maritima var. pedunculata Hartm. ex Ledeb.; Ruppia maritima var. spiralis (L. ex Dumort.) Moris; Ruppia maritima subsp. spiralis (L. ex Dumort.) Asch. & Graebn.; Ruppia occidentalis S.Watson; Ruppia spiralis J.K.Fisch., nom. illeg.; Ruppia spiralis L. ex Dumort.; Ruppia truncatifolia Miki

= Ruppia cirrhosa =

Species of aquatic plant

Ruppia cirrhosa (syn. Ruppia spiralis), spiral tasselweed, is a species of aquatic plant in the pondweed family, with a cosmopolitan distribution, that grows in brackish to saline waters. It has long, thin leaves that often form a dense layer under the surfaces of coastal ditches, lakes and lagoons. The flowers are tiny and petal-less, and produce pollen that is dispersed by the wind or floating on the water. The name refers to its ability to produce a long, coiled stalk to the fruiting inflorescence, which is not often seen.

== Description ==
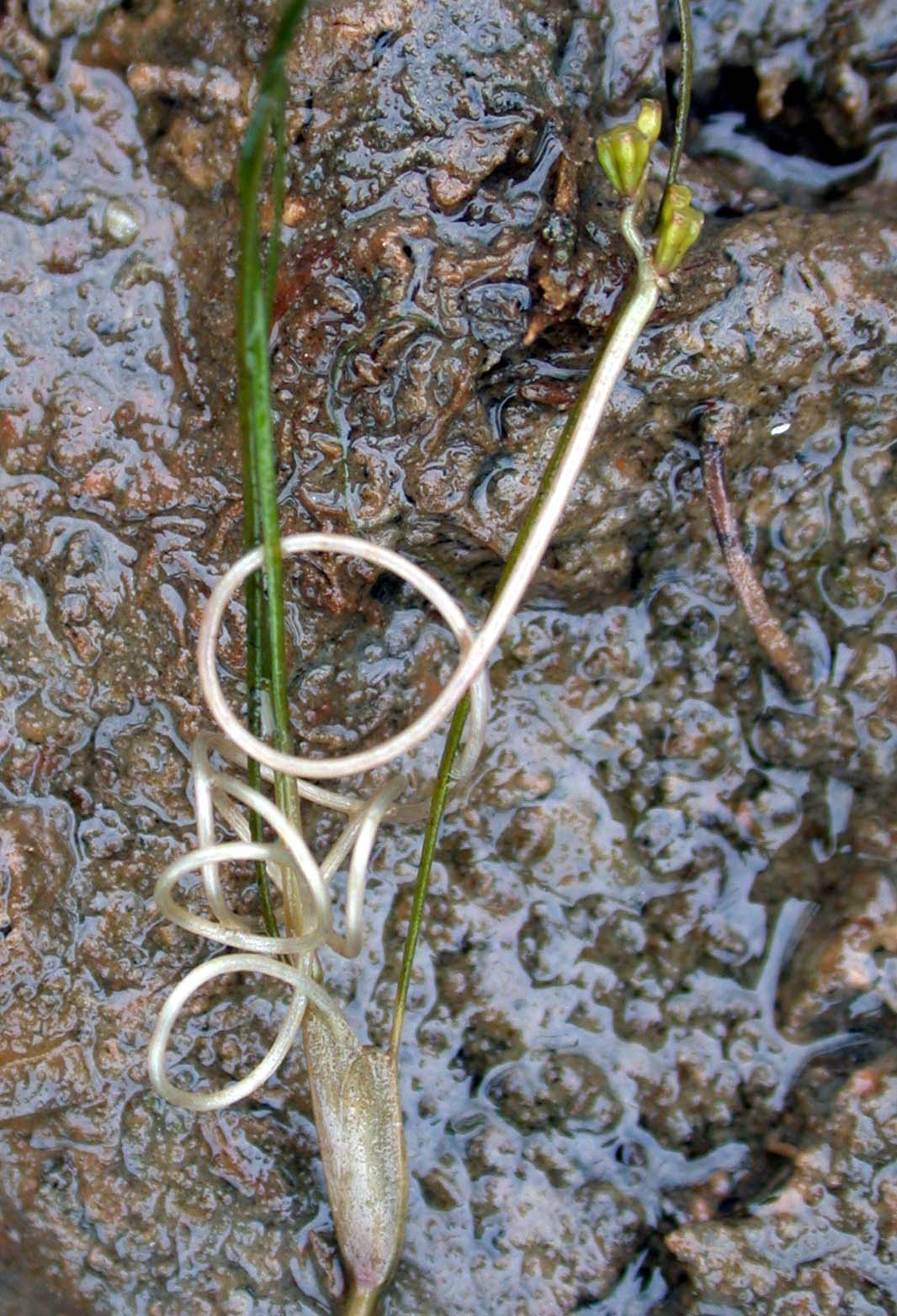
Fruiting spiral tasselweed plant, showing the characteristic long peduncle and the inflated leaf sheath.

Spiral tasselweed is a perennial aquatic plant with a monopodial rhizome that each year produces slender, delicate stems up to about 0.6 m long, with many long branches. The leaves are all the same and typically grow entirely submerged, with blades up to about 120 mm long by about 1 mm wide. The tips of the leaves are minutely serrated and quite blunt. The leaf sheaths are up to 25 mm long, open along one side and papery (hyaline) along the other. There is no ligule.

The inflorescences arise singly at the leaf axils, within the distinctively inflated sheaths of the involucral leaves. Each inflorescence contains two flowers close together at the tip of a stalk, or peduncle, which can be up to 300 mm long. Each flower has two stamens, each with two lobes, thus appearing to have four yellow, round anthers. In the middle of this group of four anthers there is cluster of 2-8 carpels, which occur on very short stalks that lengthen as the fruit matures until they get to about 32 mm in length. In spiral tasselweed the peduncle often becomes coiled at this time but, even if not coiled, it is usually at least twice as long as the individual fruit stalks, and sometimes as much as ten times as long. The flowers typically occur on the surface, in which case the pollen is dispersed by water currents, or raised into the air, when they can be wind-pollinated.

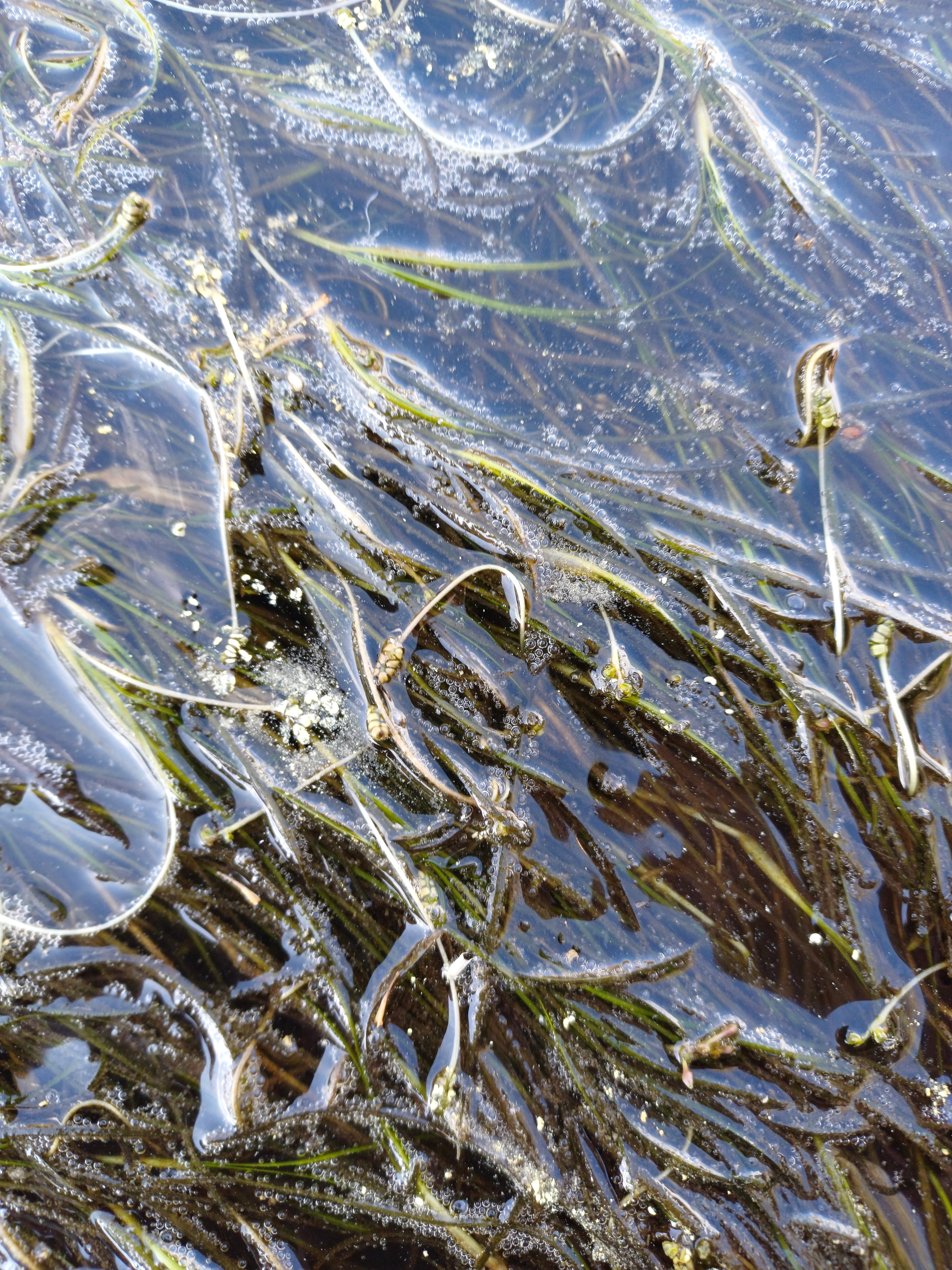
Spiral tasselweed flowering on the surface of a ditch.

The fruits are flask-shaped, up to about 3.5 mm long, and brown or grey when mature, with tiny reddish warts on the surface. They are almost symmetrical in outline, unlike the irregularly shaped fruits of beaked tasselweed.

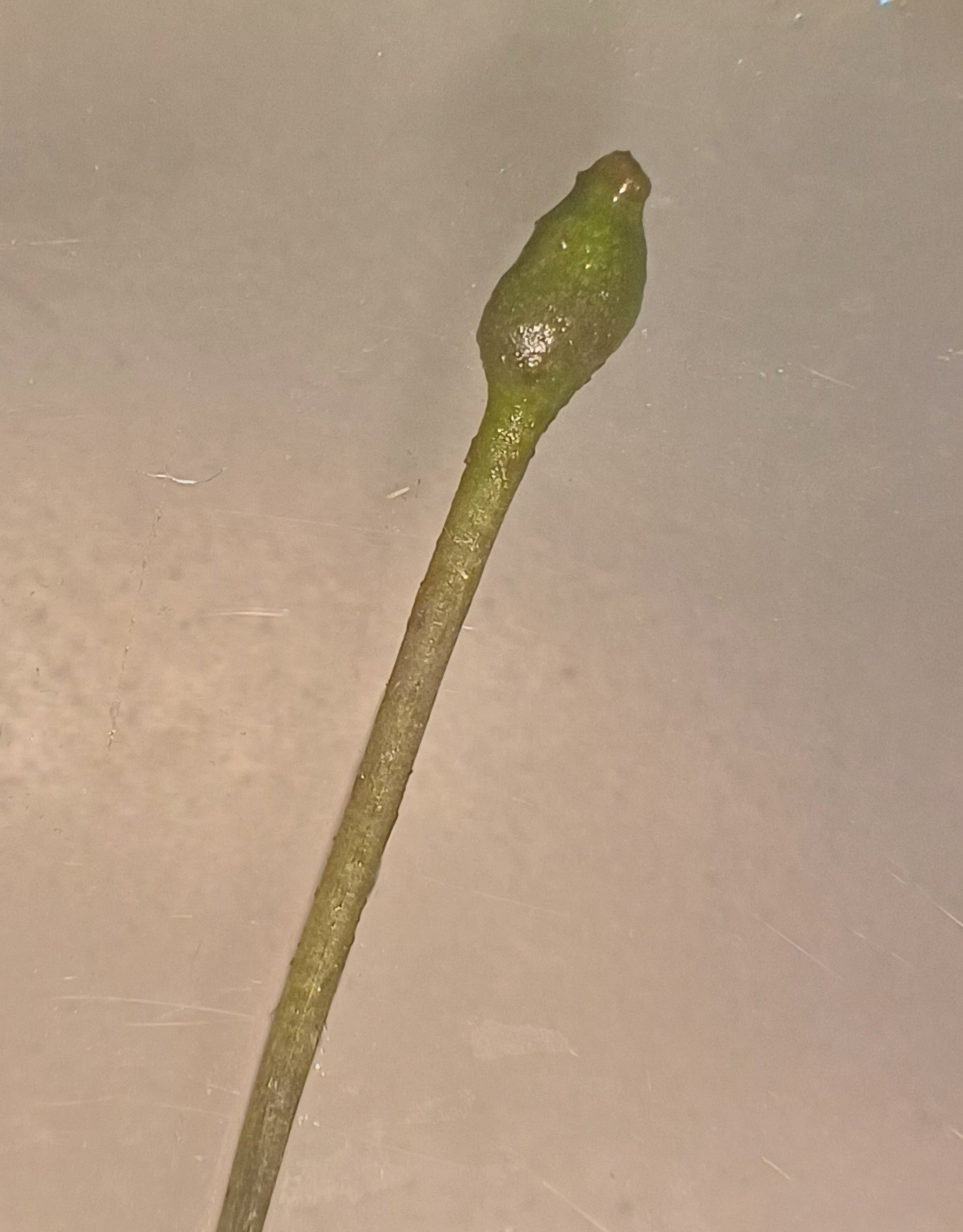
The fruit are slightly asymmetrical, but less so than in R. maritima.

== Identification ==
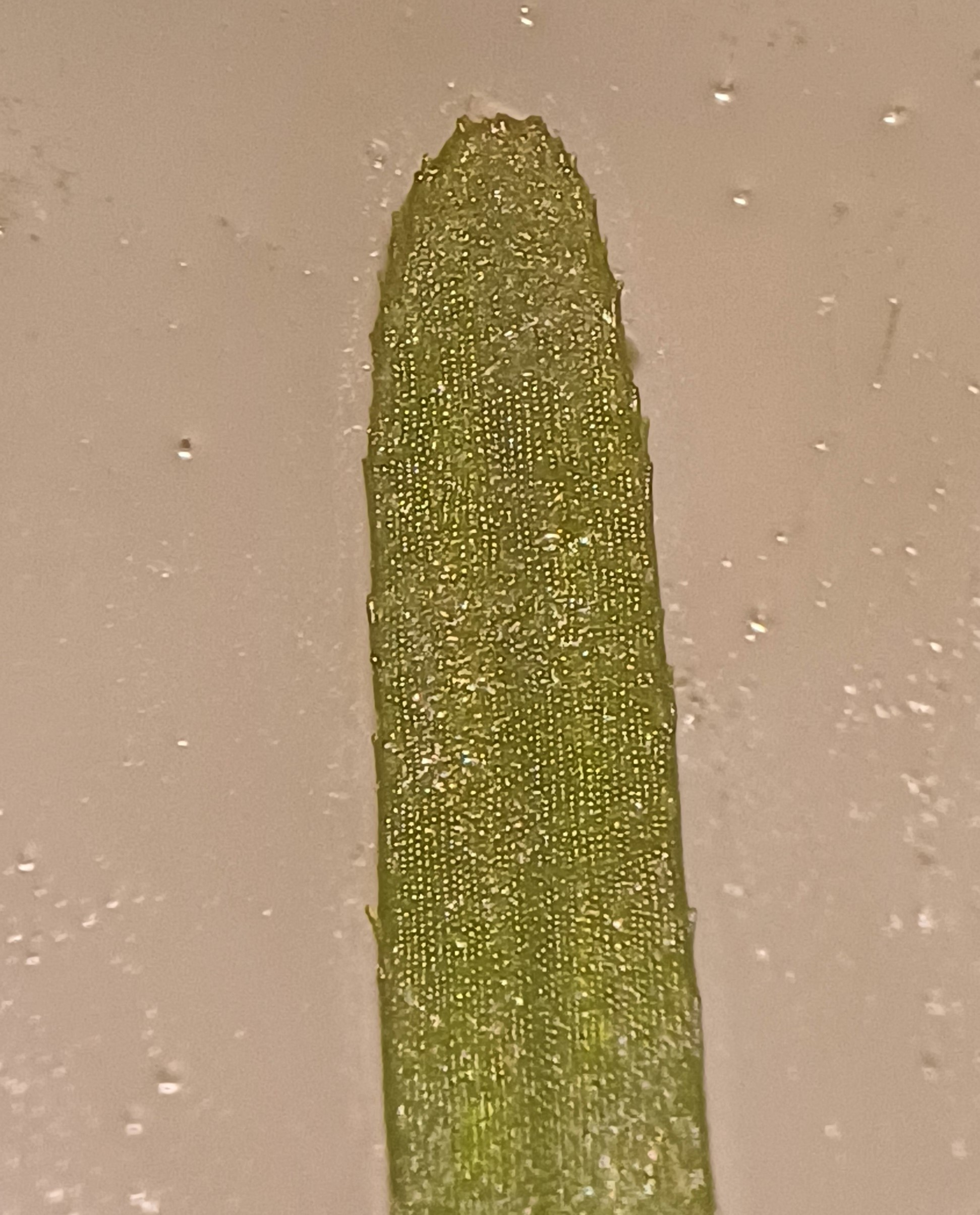
The leaf tip is rounded and minutely serrated.

Great care is needed in identifying the various species of tasselweed. In north-west Europe (including Ireland and Britain) there are only two wild species: spiral tasselweed and beaked tasselweed. Only spiral tasselweed produces a coiled peduncle, but this is rarely seen. The relative lengths of the peduncle and the fruit stalks are more reliable: spiral tasselweed has peduncles up to 4 cm - longer than the fruit stalks, which are up to 3.2 cm, whereas beaked tasselweed has peduncles up to 2.6 cm - shorter than the stalks, which are up to 3.5 cm.

== Taxonomy and nomenclature ==
In 1753 Linnaeus coined the name Ruppia for the genus, but the only species he recognised was Ruppia maritima. It was not until 1827 that Dumortier realised that there were two species, and he named spiral tasselweed Ruppia spiralis. However, Petagna had also named the same plant Buccaferrea cirrhosa in 1787 (although it was not published until 1826). Either way, that pre-dates Dumortier's discovery. The genus Buccaferrea is clearly not needed, so the combination Ruppia cirrhosa was finally published by Loreto Grande in 1918. These overlapping dates leave some uncertainty about which is the correct name to apply, but the general consensus at present is that Ruppia cirrhosa is best. However, a recent (2017) study of herbarium specimens suggests that Petagna's tasselweed might actually have been Ruppia maritima, in which case Dumortier's R. spiralis would be the correct name for the new species.

Ruppia cirrhosa has a complex taxonomy and is sometimes considered an aggregate of numerous taxa. For example, the western Mediterranean plant Ruppia drepanensis Tineo could be a subspecies. Some authors have suggested that R. cirrhosa and R. spiralis are actually different species rather than synonyms. The complexity is caused in part because R. cirrhosa occurs as diploid (2n = 20), triploid (2n = 30) or tetraploid (2n = 40) populations. It also hybridises with R. maritima.

The generic name Ruppia was given in honour of the German botanist Heinrich Bernhard Rupp, while the specific name cirrhosa is from the Ancient Greek word κιρρός (kirros), which means tawny.

== Distribution and status ==
Most sources suggest that spiral tasselweed has a cosmopolitan, circumpolar distribution, but there is some debate about this. Generally, it is found only in brackish to saline coastal locations, but North American plants (sometimes referred to as R. occidentalis) grow in freshwater inland lakes.

Its global status has been assessed by the IUCN as LC, or "least concern", which means there is no evidence for a serious decline. However, it is rare in some countries and regions and can have a local conservation status such as VU (vulnerable) in Brittany, extinct in lower Normandy, and NT (near threatened in Britain.

For conservation purposes, spiral tasselweed is generally considered an axiophyte, or indicator of good environmental conditions. There is evidence to suggest that its presence improved the diversity of invertebrates and the nutritional quality of the substrate in coastal lagoons.

== Habitat and ecology ==
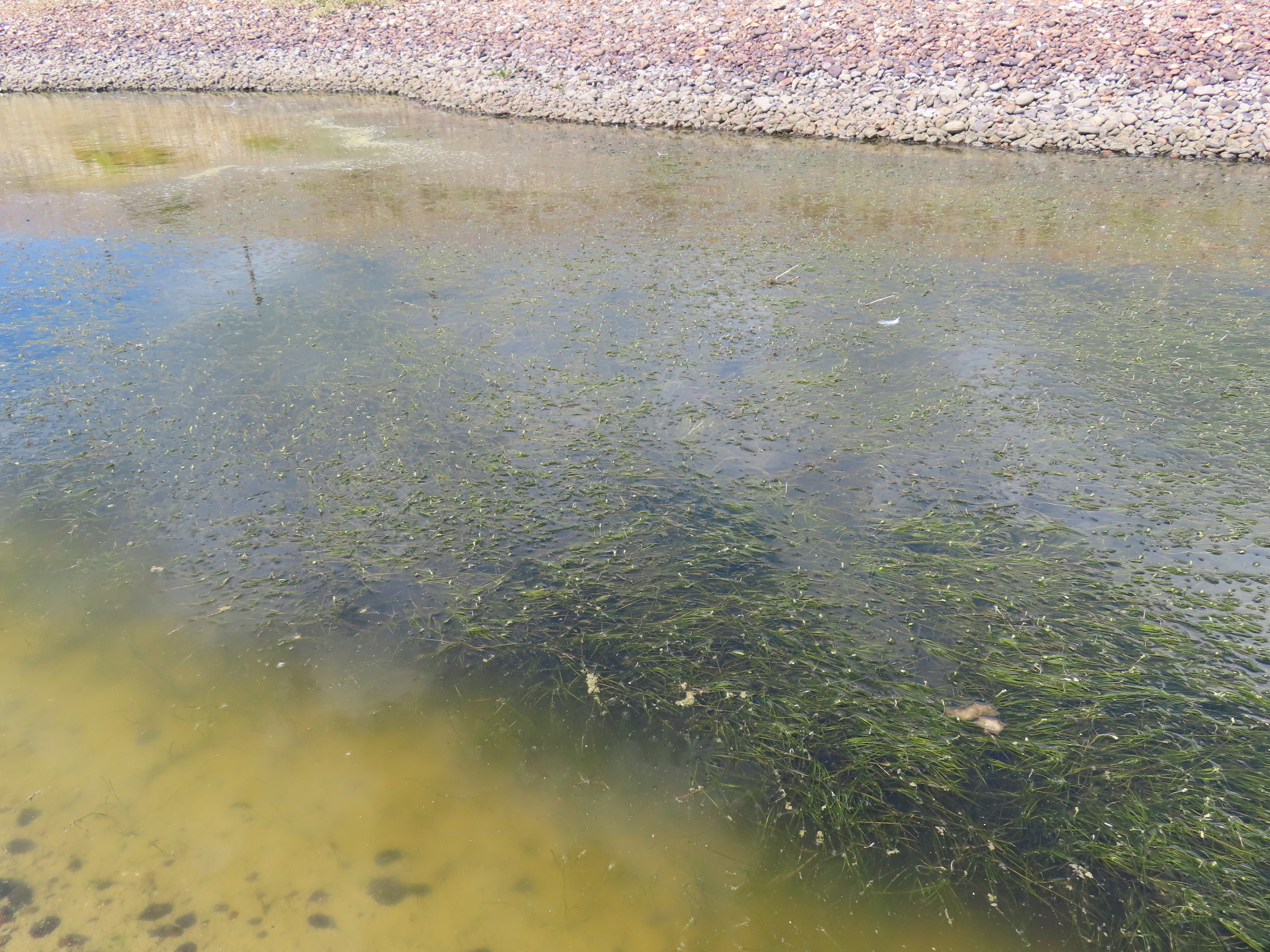
A meadow of spiral tasselweed in a lagoon at Minnis Bay, Kent.

Although spiral tasselweed often grows on its own, it is occasionally found with other plants such as the eelgrasses Zostera marina and Z. noltii - as at The Fleet, Dorset. Within the British National Vegetation Classification it is probably restricted to the SM2 Ruppia maritima community, although there was much confusion between the two species of tasselweed in the 1980s, and the description of SM2 could usefully be reworked. Most sources seem to suggest that spiral tasselweed is strictly coastal, but not a marine plant.

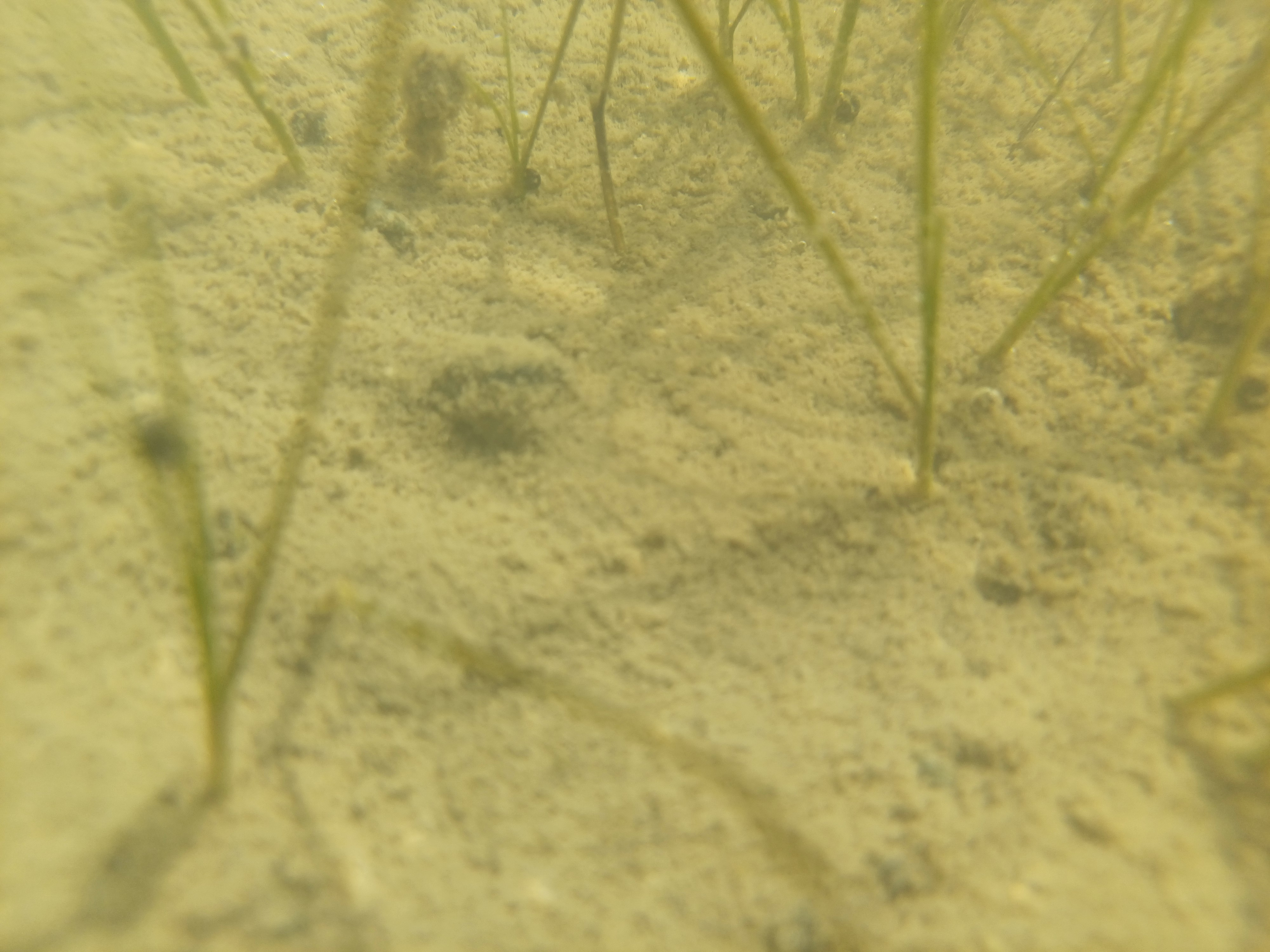
Individual plants arise from rhizomes buried in the substrate.

Its Ellenberg values in Britain are L = 7, F = 12, R = 7, N = 4, and S = 4, which reflect its habitat requirements for waterbodies in reasonably sunny places with neutral soils and low fertility, and brackish conditions.

The only insect association recorded in Europe (and probably in Britain, where it has been found on R. maritima, possibly including R. cirrhosa) is with the cercozoan Tetramyxa parasitica, which creates spherical galls in the stems of infested plants.
