= Pass a Loutre Wildlife Management Area =

Protected area in Louisiana, United States

- IUCN category V (protected landscape/seascape)
- Location within Louisiana
- Location: Plaquemines Parish, Louisiana
- Coordinates: 29°7′7″N 89°12′21″W
- Area: 115,000 acres (470 km^{2})
- Established: Nov. 1, 1921
- Governing body: Louisiana Department of Wildlife and Fisheries
- Website: www.wlf.louisiana.gov/page/passaloutre

Pass a Loutre WMA

Pass a Loutre Wildlife Management Area (WMA) is a 115,000-acre (47,000 ha) protected wetland in Plaquemines Parish, Louisiana, United States. The WMA is located due south and bordering the 48,000 acre Delta National Wildlife Refuge, accessible only by air or boat, contains the Pass A L'Outre Lighthouse (29°11′26.6″N 89°2′29.3″W), and Port Eads is within the boundary.

== Location ==
The WMA is situated on the lower Mississippi River, starting at the Head of Passes, including an extreme northern portion of the Southwest Pass, all of the South Pass, and Pass a Loutre, in the Plaquemines-Balize delta lobe of the Mississippi River Delta Basin.

== Flora ==
The WMA is a combination of low marsh, tidal marsh, mudflats, and salt marsh, covering three of the five main types of wetlands. According to the A. W. Kuchler U.S. Potential natural vegetation Types, Pass A Loutre State Wildlife Management Area would have a Southern Cordgrass, aka Spartina (78) vegetation type and a Coastal Prairie, aka Western Gulf coastal grasslands (20) vegetation form.

== Fauna ==
The Pass a Loutre WMA, within the Mississippi River Delta, sometimes referred to as "The Birds Foot", has a diverse range of wildlife including whitetail deer and rabbit, fur bearing animals and alligators, and indigenous as well as migratory birds and waterfowl that includes game species.

=== Fish ===
Fish are abundant. Freshwater species include bass, bream, catfish, crappie, warmouth, drum, and garfish. Inland saltwater fish, found in the saltwater marches include Red Drum (redfish), Spotted Seatrout (speckled trout )and Southern Flounder (flounder).

=== Invasive Pests ===
Since 2017, over 80% of the reed beds of Roseau Cane in the WMA have been damaged by the invasive "Roseau Cane Mealybug", Nipponaclerda biwakoensis, threatening wildlife habitat throughout the affected regions of the WMA.

== Mississippi Flyway ==
Pass a Loutre is the final destination of the Mississippi Flyway bird migration route for many species. About 40% of all migratory birds use this route including American goldfinch, American tree sparrow, Baltimore oriole, black-capped chickadee, blue grosbeak, blue jay, brown-headed cowbird, Bullock's oriole, chipping sparrow, common grackle, dark-eyed junco, downy woodpecker, evening grosbeak, field sparrow, hairy woodpecker, house finch, indigo bunting, northern cardinal, northern flicker, orchard oriole, pileated woodpecker, pine siskin, purple finch, red-bellied woodpecker, red-breasted nuthatch, red-winged blackbird, rose-breasted grosbeak, ruby-throated hummingbird, tufted titmouse, and the white-breasted nuthatch.

The Audubon Society priority species are the American oystercatcher, black skimmer, brown pelican, clapper rail, least tern, little blue heron, mottled duck, piping plover, reddish egret, red knot, ruddy turnstone, sanderling, seaside sparrow, short-billed dowitcher, snowy plover, western sandpiper, and Wilson's plover.

== Climate ==
According to the Köppen climate classification system, Pass A Loutre State Wildlife Management Area has a Humid subtropical climate (‘’Cfa’’). According to the United States Department of Agriculture, the Plant Hardiness zone at Sawdust Bend Bayou is 9b with an average annual extreme minimum temperature of 28.8 °F (-1.8 °C).

Climate data for Pass A Loutre State Wildlife Management Area
Month	Jan	Feb	Mar	Apr	May	Jun	Jul	Aug	Sep	Oct	Nov	Dec	Year
Mean daily maximum °F (°C)	61.5 (16.4)	63.7 (17.6)	68.9 (20.5)	74.7 (23.7)	81.5 (27.5)	86.4 (30.2)	88.5 (31.4)	88.4 (31.3)	85.8 (29.9)	79.5 (26.4)	71.4 (21.9)	64.2 (17.9)	76.2 (24.6)
Daily mean °F (°C)	55.0 (12.8)	56.7 (13.7)	62.1 (16.7)	68.3 (20.2)	80.0 (26.7)	81.1 (27.3)	83.2 (28.4)	83.3 (28.5)	80.6 (27.0)	73.8 (23.2)	65.2 (18.4)	57.9 (14.4)	70.6 (21.4)
Mean daily minimum °F (°C)	48.6 (9.2)	49.7 (9.8)	55.3 (12.9)	62.0 (16.7)	70.5 (21.4)	75.7 (24.3)	78.0 (25.6)	78.2 (25.7)	75.5 (24.2)	68.2 (20.1)	58.9 (14.9)	51.6 (10.9)	64.4 (18.0)
Average precipitation inches (mm)	5.33 (135)	4.39 (112)	5.06 (129)	4.70 (119)	4.02 (102)	5.44 (138)	7.67 (195)	9.17 (233)	6.20 (157)	4.48 (114)	4.19 (106)	3.99 (101)	64.64 (1,641)
Average relative humidity (%)	76.8	77.3	75.8	74.8	75.7	75.7	75.3	75.3	74.3	73.7	75.3	76.8	75.6
Average dew point °F (°C)	46.9 (8.3)	49.2 (9.6)	53.9 (12.2)	59.5 (15.3)	67.3 (19.6)	72.2 (22.3)	74.1 (23.4)	74.2 (23.4)	71.2 (21.8)	64.4 (18.0)	56.7 (13.7)	49.7 (9.8)	61.7 (16.5)
Source: PRISM Climate Group

== WMA use ==
Starting July 1, 1993, a Wild Louisiana Stamp, hunting license, or fishing license is required to use any Louisiana Department of Wildlife and Fisheries administered land. This includes wildlife refuges, wildlife management area, and habitat conservation areas. Any person under sixteen or sixty and over are exempt from this requirement.

== Wetland enhancement programs ==
There have been many wetland enhancement programs in the WMA. Sixteen small-scale sediment diversions (crevasses), have been completed since 1986, as well as sediment retention measures.

=== Artificial Reef Program ===
The WMA extends into the Gulf of Mexico as part of the "Artificial Reef Program" created by La. R.S. 56:639.1 et seq., and participants are the LDWF, the Louisiana State University School of the Coast and Environment, formerly the Center for Coastal, Energy, and Environmental Resources, and the Louisiana Sea Grant College Program.

=== Loutre Restoration Project ===
In 2015 the Pass a Loutre Restoration Project received a $1,000,000 matching grant from the North-American Wetland Conservation Act (NAWCA). Partners in the grant are the Coastal Protection & Restoration Authority of Louisiana, and the Louisiana Department of Wildlife and Fisheries, which will provide and additional $2,150,000. The project has an impact 2,034 acres of coastal marsh and 225 acres of beach/dune habitat, including migration and wintering habitat, and two remote bird nesting islands.

== See also ==
- List of Louisiana Wildlife Management Areas
