= Cowardin classification system =

System for classifying wetlands

The Cowardin classification system is a system for classifying wetlands, devised by Lewis M. Cowardin et al. in 1979 for the United States Fish and Wildlife Service. The system includes five main types of wetlands:

1. Marine wetlands, which are areas exposed to the open ocean
2. Estuarine wetlands, partially enclosed by land and also exposed to a mixture of fresh and salt water bodies of water
3. Riverine wetlands, associated with flowing water
4. Lacustrine wetlands, associated with a lake or other body of fresh water
5. Palustrine wetlands, freshwater wetlands not associated with a river or lake.

The primary purpose of this ecological classification system was to establish consistent terms and definitions used in inventory of wetlands and to provide standard measurements for mapping these lands.

== See also ==
- Wetland conservation
- Wetlands of the United States
