= A Directory of Important Wetlands in Australia =

List published by the Australian Government

A Directory of Important Wetlands in Australia (DIWA) is a list of wetlands of national importance to Australia published by the Department of Climate Change, Energy, the Environment and Water. Intended to augment the list of wetlands of international importance under the Ramsar Convention, it was formerly published in report form, but is now essentially an online publication. Wetlands that appear in the Directory are commonly referred to as "DIWA wetlands" or "Directory wetlands".

== Criteria for determining wetland importance ==
Using criteria agreed in 1994, a wetland can be considered “nationally important” if it satisfies at least one of the following criteria:

1. It is a good example of a wetland type occurring within a biogeographic region in Australia.
2. It is a wetland which plays an important ecological or hydrological role in the natural functioning of a major wetland system/complex.
3. It is a wetland which is important as the habitat for animal taxa at a vulnerable stage in their life cycles, or provides a refuge when adverse conditions such as drought prevail.
4. The wetland supports 1% or more of the national populations of any native plant or animal taxa.
5. The wetland supports native plant or animal taxa or communities which are considered endangered or vulnerable at the national level.
6. The wetland is of outstanding historical or cultural significance.

== Types of wetlands ==
The directory uses a classification system consisting of the following three categories (i.e. A, B and C) which are further sub-divided into a total of 40 different wetland types:

- A. Marine and Coastal Zone wetlands, which consists of 12 wetland types
- B. Inland wetlands, which consists of 19 wetland types
- C. Human-made wetlands, which consists of 9 wetland types.

== See also ==
- List of Ramsar sites in Australia
- Wetland classification
