= Palustrine wetland =

Inland marshes, swamps or bogs

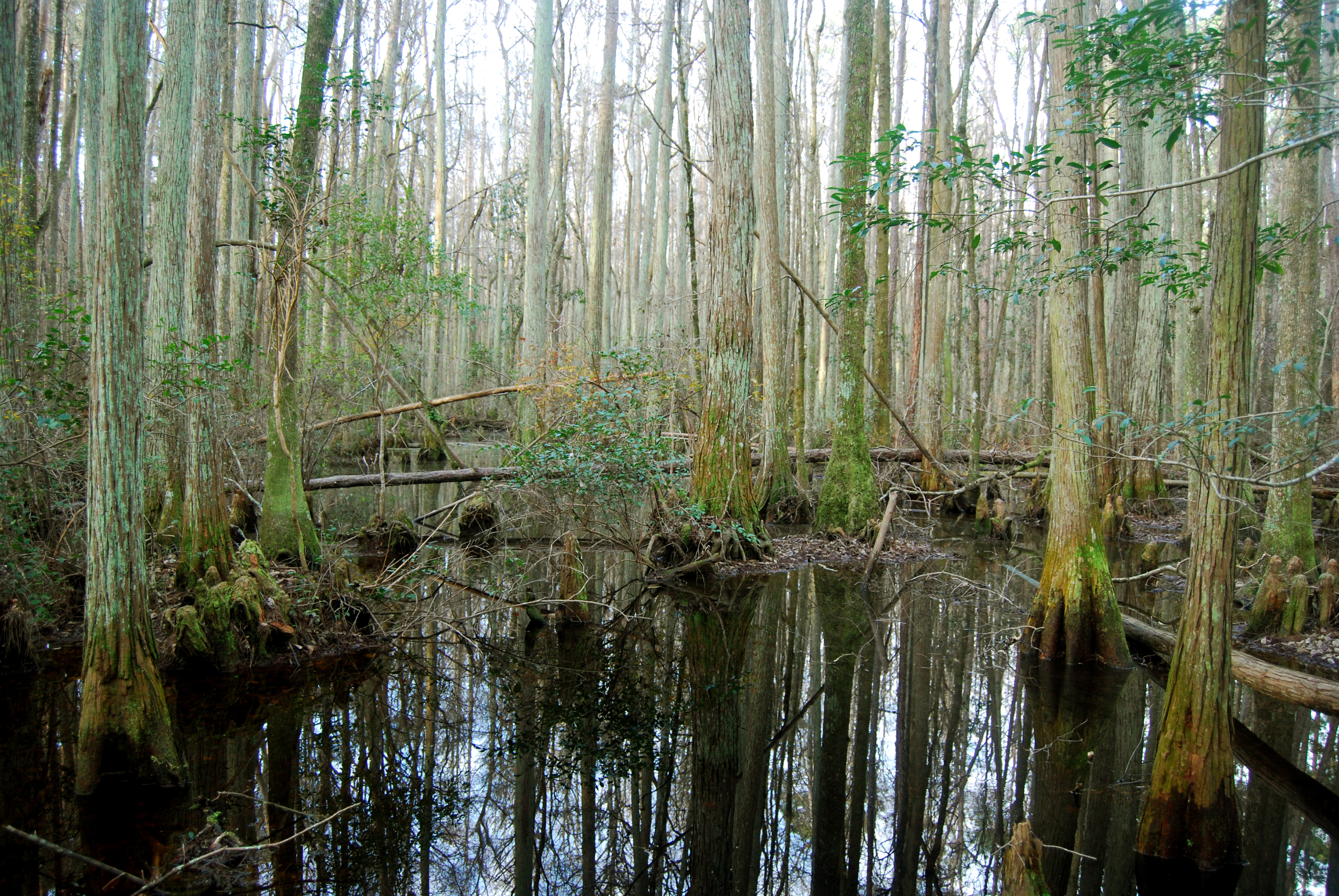
Forested swamp in Osceola National Forest

Palustrine wetlands include any inland wetland that contains ocean-derived salts in concentrations of less than 0.5 parts per thousand, and is non-tidal. The word palustrine comes from the Latin word palus or marsh. Wetlands within this category include inland marshes and swamps as well as bogs, fens, pocosins, tundra and floodplains.

According to the Cowardin classification system, palustrine wetlands can also be considered the area on the side of a river or a lake, as long as they are covered by vegetation such as trees, shrubs, and emergent plants.

== Classification ==
Palustrine wetlands are one of five systems of wetlands within the Cowardin classification system. This system was created by Lewis Cowardin and others from the United States Fish and Wildlife Service in 1987. The other systems are:

- Marine wetlands, exposed to the open ocean
- Estuarine wetlands, partially enclosed by land and containing a mix of fresh and salt water
- Riverine wetlands, associated with flowing water
- Lacustrine wetlands, associated with a lake or other body of fresh water

Palustrine wetland are also considered one of 25 functional biomes in the global ecosystem typology adopted by the International Union for the Conservation of Nature.

== Vegetation ==
The vegetation within a Palustrine system typically contains multiple species that are similar. This different groups of vegetation are aquatic bed, emergent, scrub-shrub, and forested.

- Aquatic bed vegetation typically includes floating-leaved plants, pondweed and waterlilies.
- Emergent vegetation commonly includes cattails, bulrushes, reeds, pickerel weed, arrowheads and ferns.
- Scrub-shrub wetland is dominated by woody vegetation less than 20 feet tall, such as buttonbush, alders, and many kinds of saplings.
- Forested palustrine wetland is dominated by woody vegetation over 20 feet tall.

== See also ==
- Fluvial – of or relating a river
- Oceanic – of or relating to an ocean
