= Wetland classification =

There is no commonly accepted definition of what constitutes a wetland. A number of national wetland classifications exist. In the 1970s, the Ramsar Convention on Wetlands of International Importance introduced a first attempt to establish an internationally acceptable wetland classification scheme.

== Ramsar classification ==
The Ramsar classification of wetland types is intended as a means for fast identification of the main types of wetlands for the purposes of the convention.

The wetlands are classified into three major classes:

- Marine/coastal wetlands
- Inland wetlands
- Human-made wetlands

These are further subdivided by the type of water: fresh / saline / brackish / alkaline; and may be further classified by the substrate type of other characteristics.

== National systems of classification ==
=== Australia ===
Wetlands in Australia that considered to be of national importance are so classified by criteria published in association with the Directory of Important Wetlands in Australia (DIWA).

The following list is that used within Australia to classify wetland by type:

- A—Marine and Coastal Zone wetlands
1. Marine waters—permanent shallow waters less than six metres deep at low tide; includes sea bays, straits
2. Subtidal aquatic beds; includes kelp beds, seagrasses, tropical marine meadows
3. Coral reefs
4. Rocky marine shores; includes rocky offshore islands, sea cliffs
5. Sand, shingle or pebble beaches; includes sand bars, spits, sandy islets
6. Intertidal mud, sand or salt flats
7. Intertidal marshes; includes saltmarshes, salt meadows, saltings, raised salt marshes, tidal brackish and freshwater marshes
8. Intertidal forested wetlands; includes mangrove swamps, nipa swamps, tidal freshwater swamp forests
9. Brackish to saline lagoons and marshes with one or more relatively narrow connections with the sea
10. Freshwater lagoons and marshes in the coastal zone
11. Non-tidal freshwater forested wetlands
- B—Inland wetlands
1. Permanent rivers and streams; includes waterfalls
2. Seasonal and irregular rivers and streams
3. Inland deltas (permanent)
4. Riverine floodplains; includes river flats, flooded river basins, seasonally flooded grassland, savanna and palm savanna
5. Permanent freshwater lakes (> 8 ha); includes large oxbow lakes
6. Seasonal/intermittent freshwater lakes (> 8 ha), floodplain lakes
7. Permanent saline/brackish lakes
8. Seasonal/intermittent saline lakes
9. Permanent freshwater ponds (< 8 ha), marshes and swamps on inorganic soils; with emergent vegetation waterlogged for at least most of the growing season
10. Seasonal/intermittent freshwater ponds and marshes on inorganic soils; includes sloughs, potholes; seasonally flooded meadows, sedge marshes
11. Lakeshore mudflats in freshwater lakes and ponds
12. Permanent saline/brackish marshes
13. Seasonal saline marshes
14. Shrub swamps; shrub-dominated freshwater marsh, shrub carr, alder thicket on inorganic soils
15. Freshwater swamp forest; seasonally flooded forest, wooded swamps; on inorganic soils
16. Peatlands; forest, shrub or open bogs
17. Alpine and tundra wetlands; includes alpine meadows, tundra pools, temporary waters from snow melt
18. Freshwater springs, oases and rock pools
19. Geothermal wetlands
20. Inland, subterranean karst wetlands
- C—Human-made wetlands
1. Water storage areas; reservoirs, barrages, hydro-electric dams, impoundments (generally > 8 ha)
2. Ponds, including farm ponds, stock ponds, small tanks (generally < 8 ha)
3. Aquaculture ponds; fish ponds, shrimp ponds
4. Salt exploitation; salt pans, salines
5. Excavations; gravel pits, borrow pits, mining pools
6. Wastewater treatment; sewage farms, settling ponds, oxidation basins
7. Irrigated land and irrigation channels; rice fields, canals, ditches
8. Seasonally flooded arable land, farm land

=== United States ===
Wetlands of the United States are classified according to the U.S. Fish and Wildlife Service's National Wetlands Inventory (NWI).

In the US, the best known classification systems are the Cowardin classification system and the hydrogeomorphic (HGM) classification system.

== See also ==
- Biome classification
- Ecological land classification
