= Wetland conservation =

Conservation of wet areas

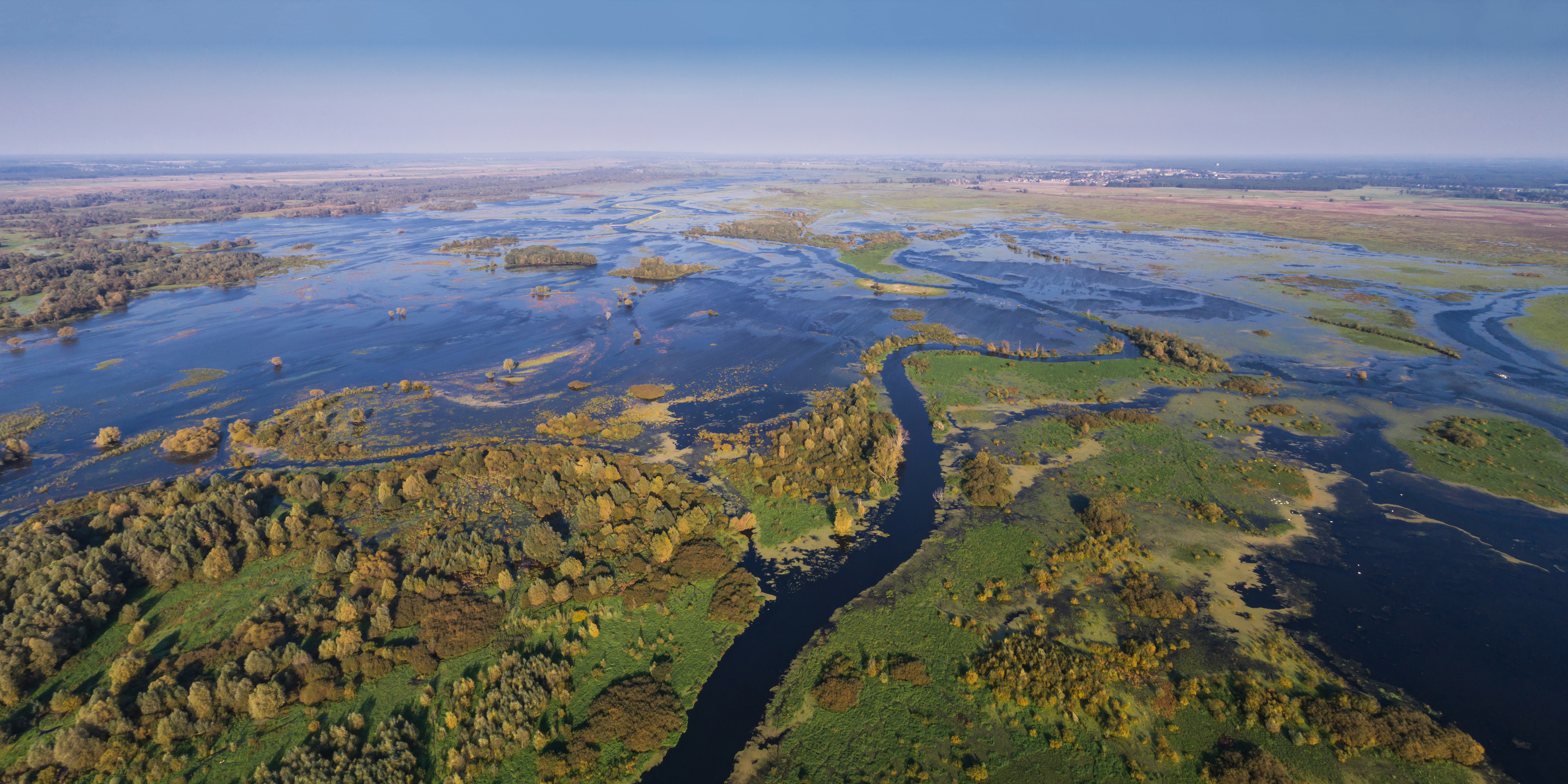
A wetland (aerial view)

Wetland conservation is the protection and preservation of land including marshes, swamps, bogs, and fens that are covered by water either seasonally or permanently. Wetlands are threatened by both natural and anthropogenic hazards, such as climate change, pollution, and the introduction of invasive species. Wetlands cover at least six percent of the Earth and have become a focal issue for conservation due to the ecosystem services they provide. They provide essential habitat for various species of wildlife, purify polluted waters, and mitigate the damaging effects of floods and storms. Furthermore, they offer a diverse range of recreational activities, including fishing, hunting, photography, and wildlife observation. More than three billion people, around half the world's population, obtain their basic water needs from inland freshwater wetlands.

== Wetland functions and value ==
=== Floodwater storage and filtration ===
Wetlands can slow and weaken floods, protecting those who live in coastal environments. Trees in swamps reduce the wind's ability to create waves and storm surges, while plants produce drag that reduces energy in waves. In addition, wetlands can absorb water from incoming floods and slowly release the water when it subsides, reducing its severity. Coastal wetlands have been estimated to have saved a median of US$447 billion in damages and 4,620 lives annually from storms.

Wetlands aid in water filtration by removing excess nutrients and slowing the flow of water, allowing particulates to settle out of the water. Studies have shown that up to 92% of phosphorus and 95% of nitrogen can be removed from passing water through a wetland. Wetlands also let pollutants settle and aggregate up to 70% of soil particles in runoff, reducing erosion. Some wetland plants have even been found with accumulations of heavy metals more than 100,000 times that of the surrounding waters' concentration.

=== Habitat ===
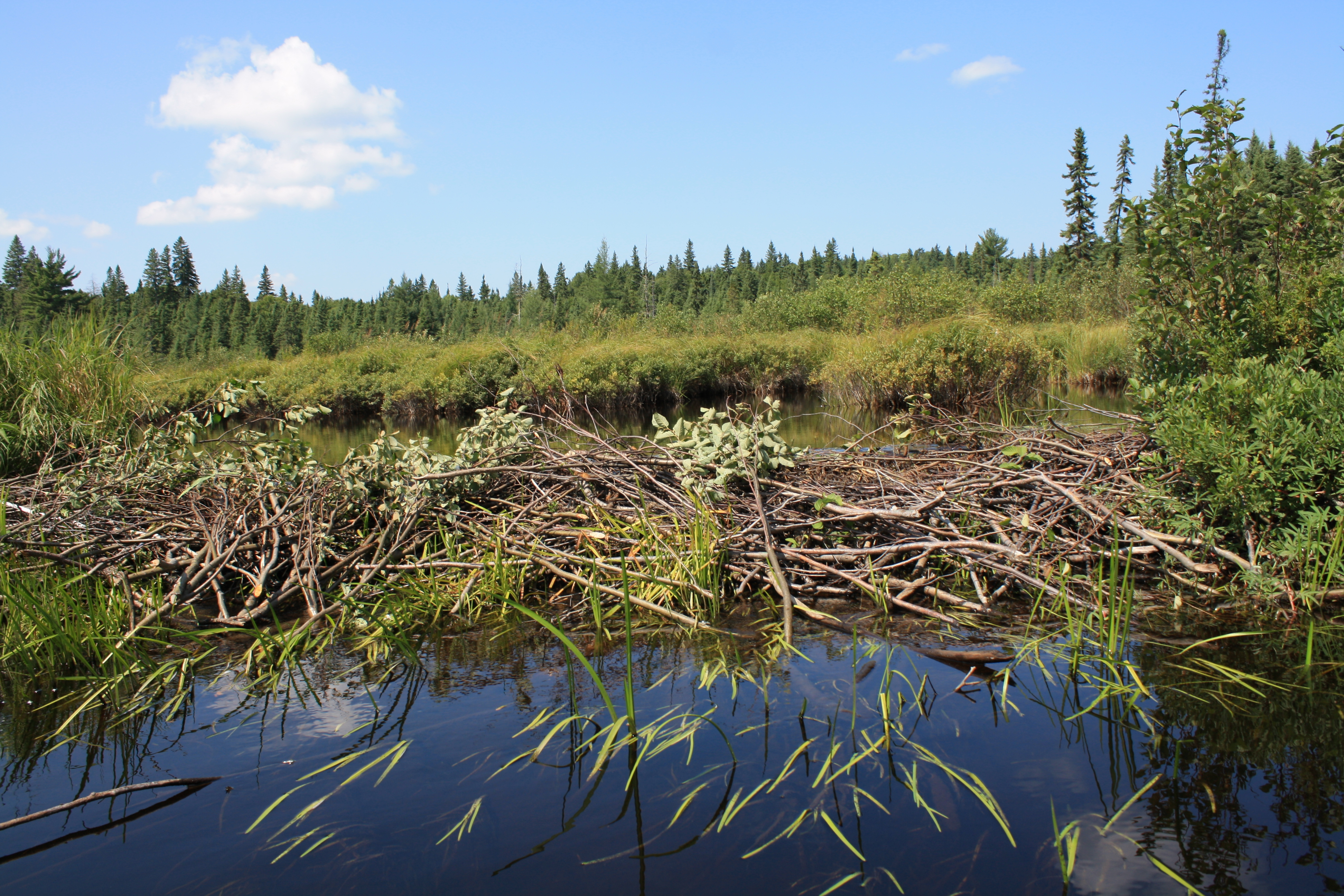
Beavers are one of the many organisms that utilize wetlands as their habitats. Dams are built by beavers as their homes to care for offspring that are used as a safe haven from predators and climate conditions.

Wetlands provide habitat for a wide array of plant and animal species. Different animals utilize wetlands in various ways. Some animals spend their entire life in wetlands, while others only use them during a specific stage of their life cycle. For example, wetlands serve as nursery habitat for commercially valuable juvenile fish and shellfish. Additionally, some organisms only use wetlands seasonally, such as birds. The synergy of shallow waters, abundant nutrients, and high primary productivity creates a perfect environment for the growth of organisms that make up the foundation of the food chain, providing nourishment for various fish, amphibians, shellfish, and insects.

=== Climate change mitigation ===
Wetlands play a crucial and multifaceted role in mitigating climate change through their natural processes and functions. They capture carbon from the air when plants grow and trap sediment from water. This carbon gets stored in plants, leaves, soil, and mud, sometimes for thousands of years. The term used by scientists to categorize carbon absorbed by coastal wetlands which is then stored in the soil and organic material is blue carbon.According to an article published by A.M. Nahlik and M.S. Fennesy, worldwide, wetlands retain around 700 billion tons of carbon, mainly in peat soils, with an annual sequestration rate of 96 million tons. In the United States, it's estimated that wetlands contain 11.52 billion tons of carbon, equivalent to approximately 1% of the global soil carbon reservoir which highlights the carbon storage capacity of wetlands on a global scale. Wetlands have a higher carbon density than most terrestrial ecosystems, placing them as the top player in global biogeochemical mitigation.

=== Biological productivity ===
Through wetland's ability to absorb nutrients, wetlands are able to be highly biologically productive (able to produce biomass quickly). Freshwater wetlands are even comparable to tropical rainforests in plant productivity. Their ability to efficiently create biomass may become important to the development of alternative energy sources.

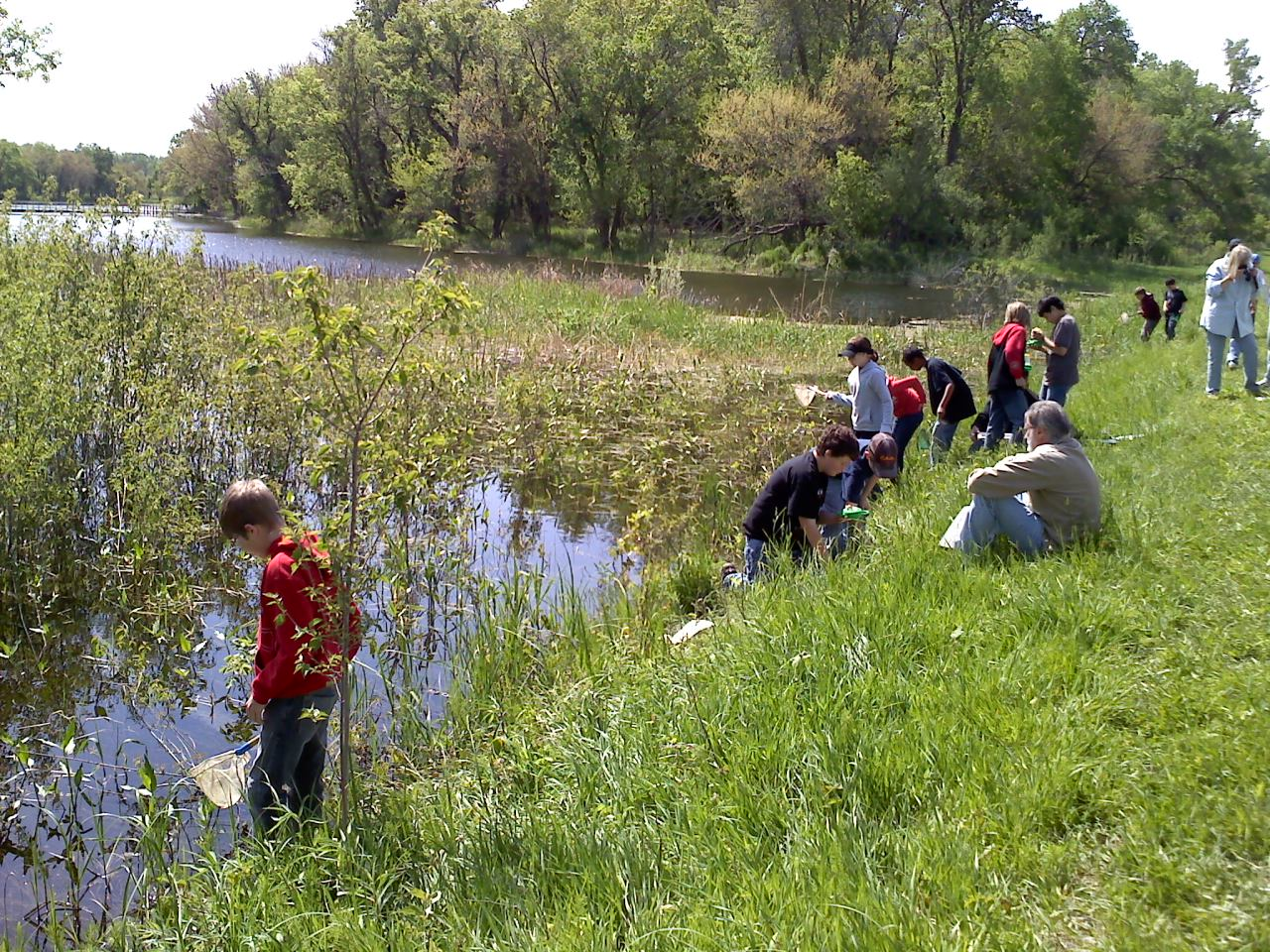
Students explore wetlands at DeSoto National Wildlife Refuge for educational benefits.

=== Fishing ===
Fisheries are also an extremely important source of protein and income in many wetlands. According to the United Nations Food and Agriculture Organization, the total catch from inland waters (rivers and wetlands) was 8.7 million metric tonnes in 2002.

=== Recreation, education and research ===
Wetlands, beyond their ecological importance, offer a wealth of recreational opportunities, serve as invaluable educational resources, and serve as living laboratories for vital research. These unique ecosystems attract outdoor enthusiasts, providing spaces for activities like birdwatching, hiking, and photography while also serving as educational platforms where people can learn about nature and environmental conservation. Additionally, wetlands provide researchers with dynamic environments to study various ecological processes and species, contributing to our understanding of the natural world. Wetlands also serve the human population as an especially important link to indigenous tribes. Archeological finds in and around wetlands include items like indigenous traditional foods, art and craft materials, and ceremonial setting. Wetlands have also been a location favored by scientists in aid to the improvement and discovery of medicine. There is an estimated 70-80% of people worldwide who rely on herbal medicine as well as income from harvest and trade of plants due to their medicinal purposes. Although there is no existence of a global inventory of wetland medicinal species, the White willow is an example. This riverine plant is used in skin care products as well as being the original source of salicylic acid.

== Threats to wetlands ==
According to UN Climate Change News, wetlands are disappearing three times faster than forests. Wetlands are facing growing threats that put their health at risk. Urban development, pollution, land drainage, and climate change are endangering these valuable habitats that serve as essential flood buffers and wildlife havens.

=== Habitat loss ===
Coastal wetlands are very vulnerable to habitat loss due to erosion, subsidence, sea-level rise, development, and drainage. Common direct impacts of habitat loss to wetlands include removal of vegetation, fluctuation in water levels, and building construction. The decline in wetland habitat has far-reaching economic and societal implications. The degradation and loss of these habitats have resulted in the reduction of fish populations in terms of both their size and diversity. This, in turn, has led to a decrease in the availability of opportunities for both the commercial fishing industry and recreational fishing, impacting the livelihoods and leisure activities of many individuals and communities. Not only is this habitat loss affecting the fish residing in these wetlands and the recreational activities that come from them, the reduction in fish populations resulting from habitat loss in wetlands can disrupt the delicate balance of the ecosystem. As fish play a crucial role in the food chain, their decline can lead to changes in the abundance and behavior of other species, affecting the entire wetland ecosystem. Wetland habitat loss also contributes to the increasing stress of remaining wetlands. Due to effects from habitat fragmentation, the remaining wetlands are then facing the increasing volume of pollution, surface temperatures, decreasing landscape diversity, and connectivity for marine resources including fish and other sensitive wildlife. Other factors that contribute to wetland loss are agricultural drainage, groundwater dewatering, and urban sprawl from road and rail construction.

=== Pollution ===
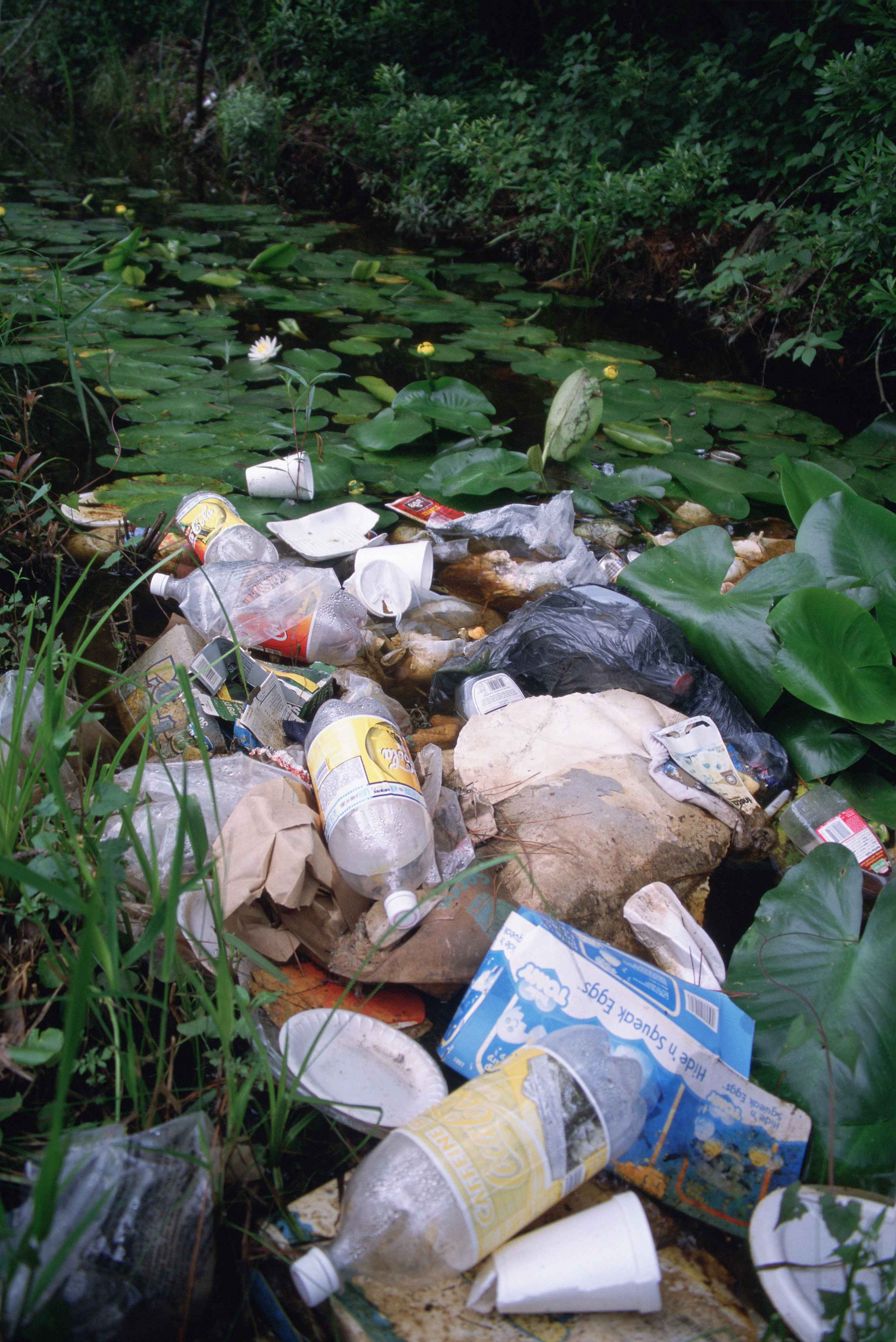
Plastic pollution residing in wetland

Wetlands are susceptible to the detrimental effects of pollution, which can undermine their ecological health and diminish their vital functions. Pollution from various sources, including agricultural runoff, industrial discharges, and urban contaminants, poses a significant threat to the delicate balance of wetland ecosystems, affecting not only their plant and animal residents but also the critical services they provide. According to an article published by NOAA Fisheries, due to high concentrations of pollution, a wetland's filtration system capacity can become overwhelmed thus allowing excess nutrients and toxic chemicals to concentrate in waterways which create dead zones that leave organisms that live in the water to be unable to survive. Not only do wetlands only serve as conduits for the passage of plastic waste but also act as sites where plastic waste accumulates over time, posing enduring challenges. Human actions, including the construction of roads and the extraction of resources, have significantly disturbed wetland ecosystems. This has made previously drained wetlands susceptible to wildfires thus increasing the chance of air pollution from the toxic metals that wetlands have absorbed and stored resting in peat that can pose health threats to people and environment. Once a drained wetland ignites, "peatland fires are difficult to contain as they can smolder for weeks, months or even years. They produce copious of smoke and ash, filling the air with microscopic particles."

=== Invasive species ===
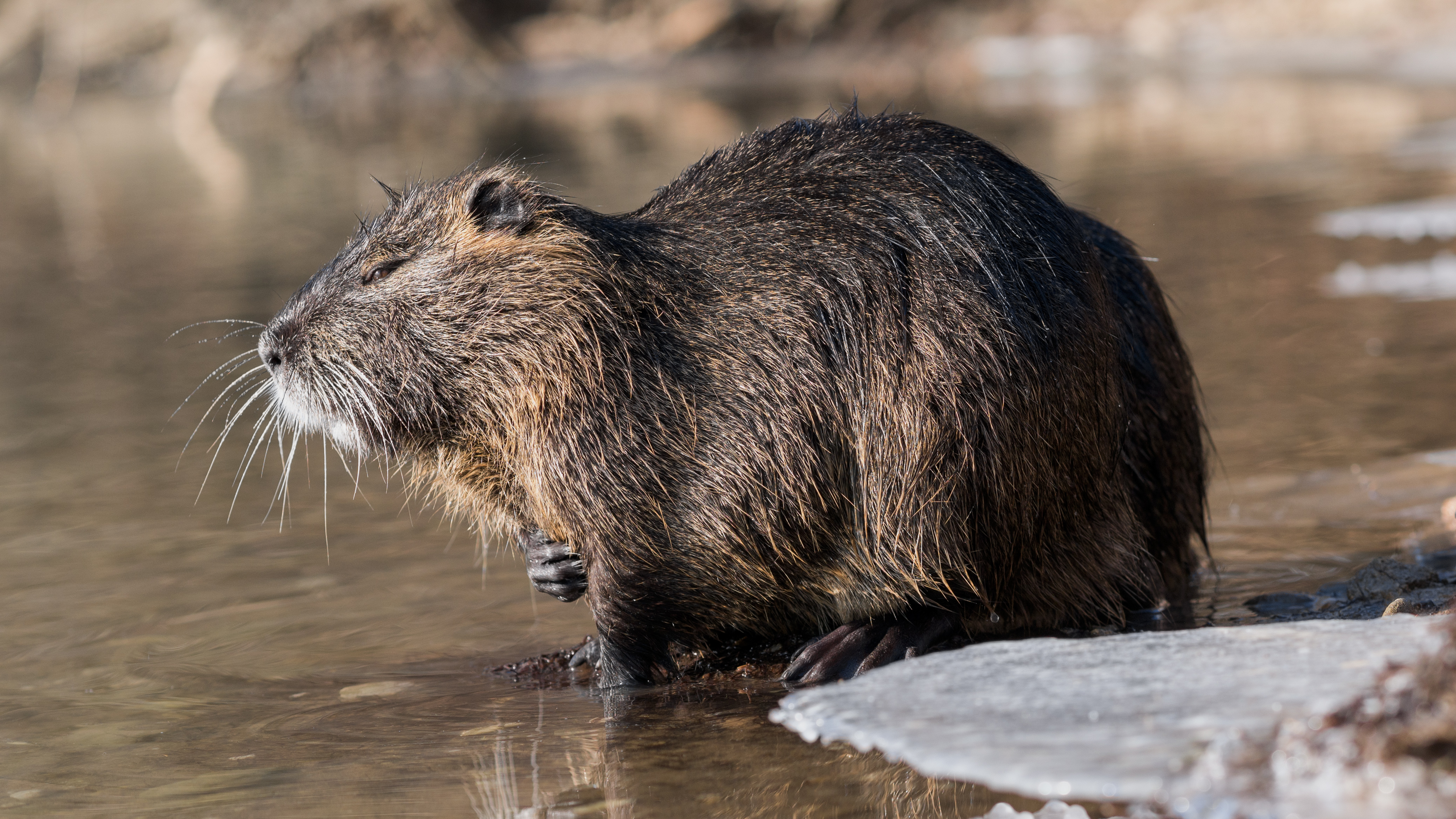
Nutria (Myocastor coypus)

Invasive species are causing considerable harm to wetlands by outcompeting native plants and animals, thereby disrupting the delicate balance of these ecosystems. These invaders often grow more aggressively and can change the wetland's structure and function, reducing its capacity for flood control and water purification. Additionally, invasive species can negatively impact the availability of suitable habitats for native species and contribute to the overall degradation of wetland health. An example of one of the many organisms that pose as an invasive species threat to wetlands is the Nutria. The Nutria is a semi-aquatic rodent that originated from South America but was brought to the United States in 1889 due to the popularity of its fur, but over the years has taken over wetlands due to being released or escaping ranches. Due to their high reproductive rate and lack of implemented population control, these rodents have led to crop damage, decrease of native plants due to consumption, and an increase in flood damage due to their low made burrows.

=== Climate change ===
Climate change has a significant impact on wetlands, primarily through rising temperatures and altered precipitation patterns. These changes can lead to shifts in wetland ecosystems, affecting the distribution of plant and animal species. Additionally, increased temperatures can result in the loss of wetland habitat by killing temperature and salinity sensitive organisms and contribute to sea-level rise, which can further threaten the stability and function of coastal wetlands as barriers for vulnerable communities as well as leading to altered precipitation patterns and prolonged droughts, resulting in reduced water levels and drying of wetland areas. Changes in salinity is heavily affected by changes in precipitation, storm surges, and surface temperature. As temperatures rise, wetlands are susceptible to more frequent and severe wildfires. The increased fire risk can lead to the destruction of wetland vegetation, further diminishing their capacity to support wildlife and maintain their ecological functions. As wetland habitat decreases, Greenhouse Gasses (GHG) including methane, carbon dioxide, and nitrous oxide which account for approximately 60%, 20%, and 6% of global warming contributions respectively, would not be absorbed or sequestered, thus quickening a currently increasing climate change rate.

=== Governance ===
A 2018 global study published in Nature analyzed population trends of 461 species of waterbirds from over 25,000 monitoring sites across the world to identify the drivers of population change in wetland-dependent birds. The study found that national governance quality—measured through indicators like political stability, rule of law, and effectiveness of institutions—was one of the most significant predictors of waterbird population trends. Regions with stronger governance, such as parts of Europe and North America, tended to maintain stable or growing populations of waterbirds. In contrast, regions with weaker governance—including parts of Central Asia, Sub-Saharan Africa, and South America—showed widespread declines. These findings suggest that biodiversity conservation in wetlands cannot be achieved in isolation from broader political and governance reforms.

Under the United Nations' Sustainable Development Goals, the objectives of the 1971 Ramsar Convention were upheld, augmenting a "no-net-loss' policy encouraging most nations to move away from converting wetlands to croplands. Although rates of wetland conversion had been maintain or increased in some regions like Indonesia where tropical peat swamps have ben converted for industrial and agricultural use, rates of overall wetland conversion has declined in most countries.

== Restoration efforts and projects ==
Numerous projects and organizations are actively contributing to wetland restoration efforts. They often collaborate with government agencies, local communities, and conservationists to rehabilitate degraded wetlands by implementing restoration plans. These initiatives include activities like re-establishing water flow, controlling invasive species, and replanting native vegetation, ultimately revitalizing wetland ecosystems and safeguarding their critical ecological functions. Current United States regulations require that any degradation or "take" caused by human development or pollution activities to wetland habitats be mitigated by recreating new wetland acreage or by paying incentives to restoration projects. For example, as a requirement of the "no-net-loss" of wetlands policy adopted by the National Park Service, any construction or similar activity on park lands having significant harmful impact to wetland habitat must mitigate by restoring at east one acre of wetland per acre affected or destroyed. The following list is not comprehensive.

=== National Oceanic and Atmospheric Administration (NOAA; USA 2022) ===
In Louisiana's Barataria Basin, NOAA and partners have begun construction on one of the largest habitat restoration efforts to date in a 1,200 acre marsh in hopes to restore and create a new habitat, reduce erosion, and protect communities.

=== Eden Reforestation Project (USA 2022) ===
The Eden Reforestation Project is a non-profit organization that collaborates directly with local communities and non-government/government organizations and focuses on global reforestation efforts. They work in various countries, employing local workers to plant trees and restore damaged forests, aiming to combat deforestation, alleviate poverty, and mitigate the effects of climate change. Eden relies on data-driven strategies in its restoration efforts and maintains a strong dedication to flexible management practices. This involves integrating the latest scientific insights, adapting methods as they evolve, and implementing tailored monitoring techniques for each project to ensure their effectiveness, reliability, and repeatability.

=== Comprehensive Everglades Restoration Plan (CERP; USA 2000–present) ===
The CERP is a multi-billion-dollar plan approved by the U.S. Congress in 2000 to save the wetlands of the Everglades in southern Florida with only 50% of its natural wetlands remaining. The goal of this plan is to increase freshwater storage, improve water quality, and re-establish the natural water flow. Out of the 68 restoration components outlined in the Integrated Development Strategy, 24 had been finalized by the end of 2021. During that same year, two additional projects were successfully concluded. In 2022, one project is on track for completion, while construction is actively progressing on nine other projects.

=== Yellow River Wetland Conservation (China 2019) ===
The Yellow River Wetland Conservation Project is an initiative in China aimed at preserving and restoring the critical wetland ecosystems along the Yellow River, also known as the Huang He. The Yellow River is one of China's major rivers, and it flows through several provinces, supporting various wetland habitats and wildlife. The project focuses on a range of activities including wetland restoration, biodiversity protection, and sustainable land use.

=== Danube River Basin Program (Europe 2023–present) ===
Dunube4all is a supported effort to restore ocean and waters of Europe. The goal of this project is to restore freshwater ecosystems in the Danube River Basin by 2030. The project employs a cross-sector approach to tackle the wide range of environmental issues within the Danube River Basin. These encompass the significant loss of river connectivity, related ecosystem decline, declines in biodiversity, and the necessity for fresh approaches to nature-centered solutions that can rejuvenate our relationship with the river.

=== Burmese Python Management Project (Florida, USA 2024–present) ===
The Burmese Python Management Project in Florida's Everglades National Park addresses the ecological impact of invasive Burmese pythons, which have contributed to significant declines in local wildlife populations. These non-native snakes have established a breeding population in the Everglades, affecting species such as raccoons, opossums, and marsh rabbits. The project uses drone-based telemetry technology, including systems developed by Wildlife Drones to track and monitor multiple tagged pythons across large areas, improving data collection and supporting efforts to manage the python population and restore the Everglades ecosystem.

== See also ==
- World Wetlands Day
