= Wildlife Drones =

Wildlife Drones is an Australian company specialising in drone radio-telemetry, offering radio-tracking and thermal imaging services. The company is headquarters in Canberra, Australia, and its technology is used by researchers, wildlife biologists, government agencies, and environmental consultants to collect data for wildlife conservation and management.

== History ==
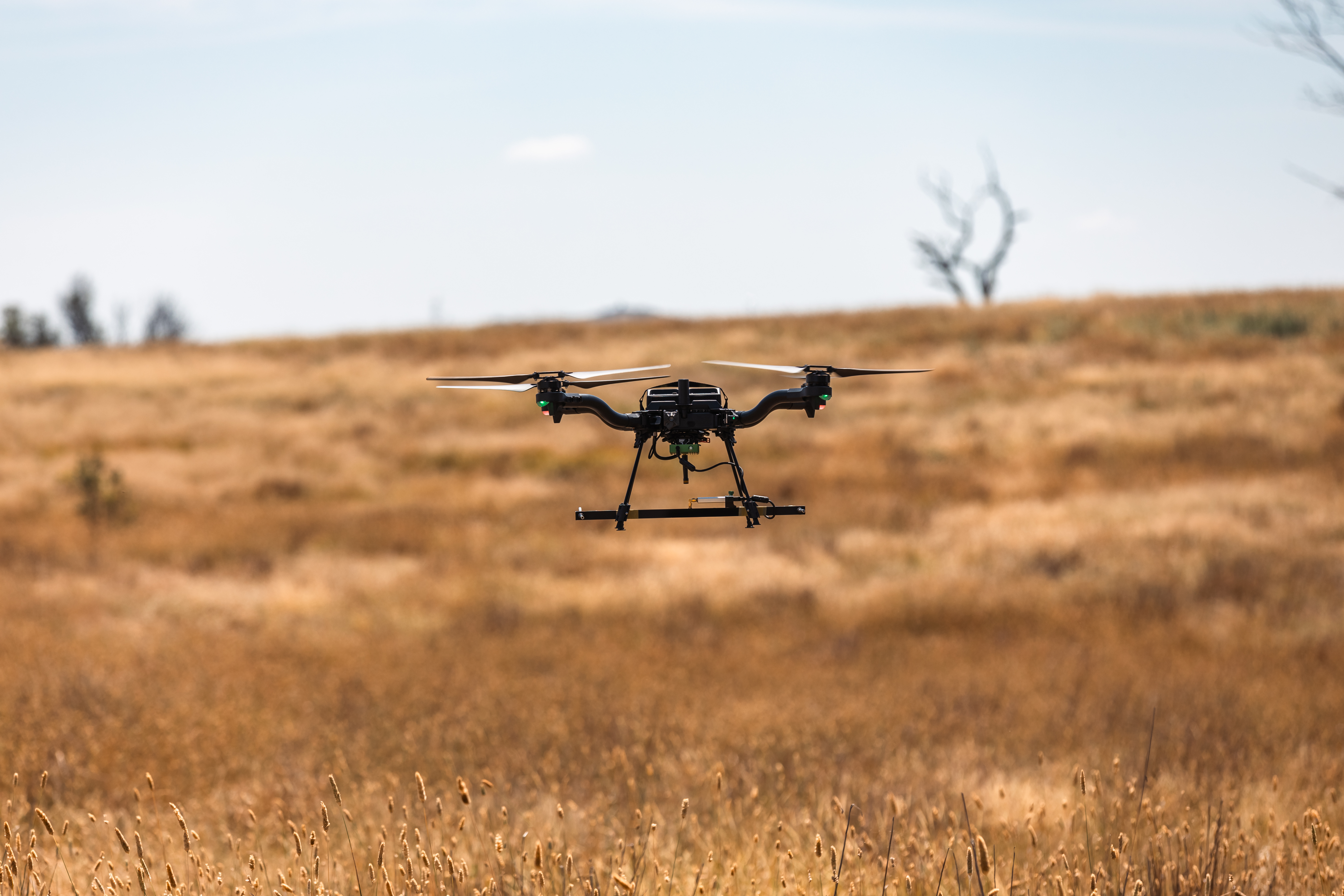
Wildlife Drones

Wildlife Drones was founded in 2016 by Debbie Saunders, a conservation ecologist, following her doctoral research at the Fenner School of Environment and Society, ANU. Saunders' work on the winter habitat use and movements of the Swift Parrot led to the development of a radio-receiver payload designed for use with drones. This included real-time signal processing, analytics, and mapping software.

== Product ==
Wildlife Drones has developed a radio-receiver system for drones, which consists of two main components:

1. Payload, which includes a radio-receiver and a VHF directional antenna, which can be mounted onto various drones. The receiver processes signal data in real-time and sends it to a base station.
2. Base station: The base station receives signal data from the drone payload and maps tracking data, without requiring internet connectivity.
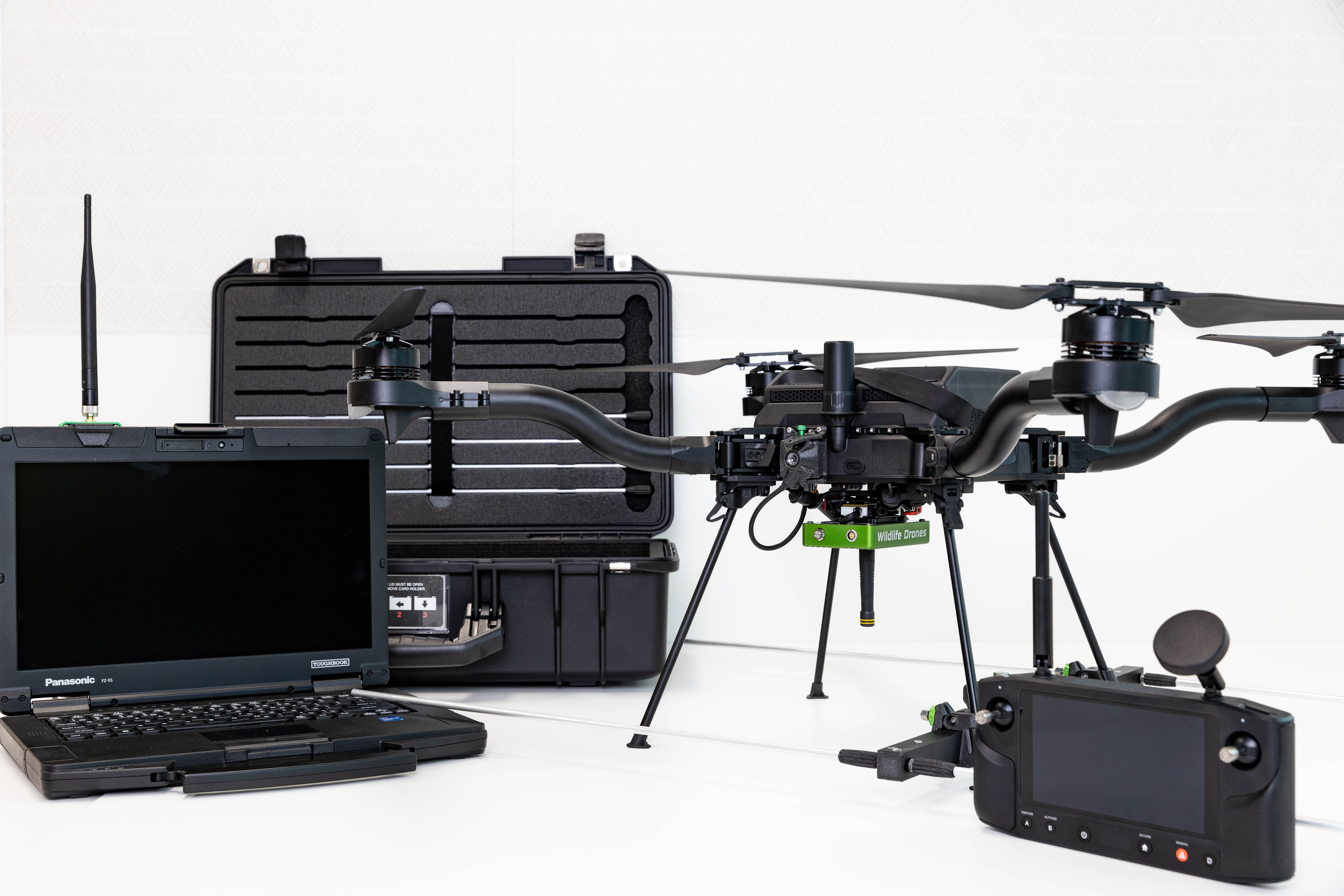
  Wildlife Drones product

The system allows for tracking of radio-tagged animals by detecting signals from VHF radio-tags, providing location data. It can be used in conjunction with other sensors, such as thermal imaging cameras, to locate and monitor animals in various environments, including challenging terrains.

== Applications ==
The technology is applied in various wildlife conservation efforts, such as tracking endangered species, studying animal behaviour, and monitoring populations in hard-to-access areas. It has also been used in research on human-wildlife conflicts, and to combat illegal wildlife trade and poaching.

== Publications ==
- Radio-tracking wildlife with drones: a viewshed analysis quantifying survey coverage across diverse landscapes
- Wildlife Drones - innovative radio-tracking capabilities

Further Publications by Dr Debbie Saunders and contributions:

- Wildlife Research in Australia
- Online Localization of Radio-Tagged Wildlife with an Autonomous Aerial Robot System

== Awards ==
- Tech23 Deeptech Festival
- Australian Government Entrepreneur Program - Accelerating Commercialisation Award
- 2023 Business Women of the year - ACT
- 2023 Women and Drones Hall of Fame
- Airwards
- Canberra women in business (Finalist)

== Projects ==
- Pangolins – Tracking movement patterns to counter illegal trafficking in Vietnam- project with Save Vietnam's Wildlife
- Asian Giant Hornet - Tracking invasive species in Washington state - project with Washington State Department of Agriculture
