= Nipponaclerda biwakoensis =

Scientific classification
- Kingdom: Animalia
- Phylum: Arthropoda
- Class: Insecta
- Order: Hemiptera
- Suborder: Sternorrhyncha
- Family: Aclerdidae
- Genus: Nipponaclerda
- Species: N. biwakoensis

Binomial name
- Nipponaclerda biwakoensis (Kuwana, 1907)

Synonyms
- Aclerda biwakoensis

Species of true bug

Nipponaclerda biwakoensis is a scale insect originally described from Japan, and naturally occurring in China; in these countries it is most often associated with reeds in the genus Phragmites. This species has become established (as of 2017) in the United States in the state of Louisiana, where it has rapidly become a serious pest of roseau cane, damaging over 80% of the reeds in some areas such as the Pass a Loutre Wildlife Management Area, where it is referred to by the older common name Phragmites scale insect or the more recently-coined name, roseau cane mealybug. Several species of parasitoid wasps are known to attack this scale, with initial investigations focusing on the species Neastymachus japonicus, known only to attack this one pest.

== Impact ==
While Phragmites is often considered a noxious weed, in Louisiana the reed beds, dubbed "roseau cane", are critical to the stability of the shorelines of wetland areas and waterways of the Mississippi River Delta, and the die-off of reed beds is believed to accelerate coastal erosion.
