= Heinrich Bernhard Ruppius =

German botanist (1688–1719)

Heinrich Bernhard Rupp (or Ruppius) (born 22 August 1688 in Giessen, died 7 March 1719 in Jena) was a German botanist.

He first studied medicine in 1704 and met then Johann Jacob Dillenius (1684-1747). He first studied in Iena in 1711, then in Leiden in 1712 then back in Jena in 1713.

Rupp wrote a flora about plants around Jena and part of Thuringia. He published the two first parts but his work is finished after his death by Albrecht von Haller (1708-1777). Carl von Linné (1707-1778) gave tribute to him with the creation of the genus Ruppia of the family Ruppiaceae.

== Works ==
- Flora Jenensis sive enumeratio plantarum tam sponte circa Jenam et in locis vicinis nascentium, quam in hortis obviarum : methodo conveniente in classes distributa, figurisque rariorum aeneis ornata; in usum botanophilorum Jenensium edita multisque in locis correcta et aucta (Frankfurt am Main and Leipzig, 1726)
- Alberti Haller Flora Jenensis Henrici Bernhardi Ruppii, ex posthumis auctoris schedis et propriis observationibus aucta et emendata; accesserunt plantarum rariorum novae icones (Jena, 1745)

== See also ==
- List of botanists by author abbreviation (Q–R)
