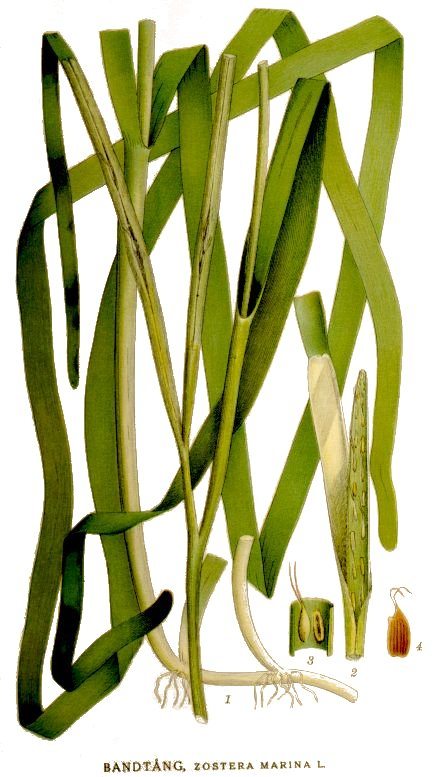
- Zostera marina, from Lindman (1917–1926)

Scientific classification
- Kingdom: Plantae
- Clade: Tracheophytes
- Clade: Angiosperms
- Clade: Monocots
- Order: Alismatales
- Family: Zosteraceae; Dumort.

Genera
- Phyllospadix; Zostera

= Zosteraceae =

Family of aquatic plants

Zosteraceae (one of the four seagrass families, Kubitzki ed. 1998) is a family of marine perennial flowering plants found in temperate and subtropical coastal waters, with the highest diversity located around Korea and Japan. Most seagrasses complete their entire life cycle under water, having filamentous pollen especially adapted to dispersion in an aquatic environment and ribbon-like leaves that lack stomata. Seagrasses are herbaceous and have prominent creeping rhizomes. A distinctive characteristic of the family is the presence of characteristic retinacules, which are present in all species except members of Zostera subgenus Zostera.

Zosteraceae has long been accepted by taxonomists as monophyletic. The APG II system of 2003 recognizes this family and places it in the monocot order Alismatales. The family contains approximately twenty-two species divided between two genera, Phyllospadix and Zostera (Christenhusz & Byng 2016). Zostera contains three subgenera: Heterozostera (formerly considered a separate genus), Zostera and Zosterella. Zosteraceae is closely related to Potamogetonaceae, a family of freshwater aquatics.

Zosteraceae is a conserved name.

== Taxonomy ==
Marine grasses families: Zosteraceae, Cymodoceaceae, Ruppiaceae and Posidoniaceae. Related families: Potamogetonaceae and sometimes including Zannichelliaceae.

Families and Genera crosses (Sea grasses)
Kubitzki, ed. (1998)	Watson & Dallwitz (delta-intkey)	data.kew	APWeb (mobot.org)
Zosteraceae
1. Zostera L.	Zostera	Zostera L.	Zostera L. (including Heterozostera den Hartog, Nanozostera Tomlinson & Posluzny)
2. Heterozostera den Hartog	Heterozostera	Heterozostera (Setch.) Hartog	(in Zostera)
3. Phyllospadix Hook.	Phyllospadix	Phyllospadix Hook.	Phyllospadix J. D. Hooker
Cymodoceaceae
1. Syringodium Kütz	Syringodium	Syringodium Kutz.	(in Cymodocea)
2. Halodule Endl.	Halodule	Halodule Endl.	Halodule Endlicher
3. Cymodocea König	Cymodocea	Cymodocea K.Koenig (including Phycoschoenus (Asch.) Nakai )	Cymodocea König (including Amphibolis Agardh ?, Syringodium Kütz. ?, Thalassodendron den Hartog ?)
4. Amphibolis Agardh	Amphibolis	Amphibolis C.Agardh (including Pectinella J.M.Black)	(in Cymodocea)
5. Thalassodendron de Hartog	(name not found)	Thalassodendron Hartog	(in Cymodocea)
Ruppiaceae
Ruppia L.	Ruppia	(in Ruppia L. in Potamogetonaceae)	Ruppia L.
Posidoniaceae
Posidonia König	Posidonia	Posidonia K.Koenig	Posidonia König

Families and Genera crosses (Potamogetonaceae)
Kubitzki, ed. (1998)	Watson & Dallwitz (delta-intkey)	data.kew	APWeb (mobot.org)
Potamogetonaceae
1. Potamogeton L.	Potamogeton	Potamogeton L.	Potamogeton L. (including Coleogeton Les & Haynes, Stuckenia Börner)
2. Groenlandia J. Gray	Groenlandia	Groenlandia J.Gay	Groenlandia J. Gay
(in Ruppia in Ruppiaceae)	(in Ruppia in Ruppiaceae)	Ruppia L.	(in Ruppia in Ruppiaceae)
(in Althenia: Zannichelliaceae and Lepilaena: Zannichelliaceae)	(in Althenia: Zannichelliaceae and Lepilaena: Zannichelliaceae)	(in Althenia F.Petit: Zannichelliaceae and Lepilaena J.L.Drumm. ex Harv.:Zannichelliaceae)	Althenia Petit (including Lepilaena Harvey)
(in Pseudalthenia including Vleisia: Zannichelliaceae)	(in Pseudalthenia: Zannichelliaceae and Vleisia: Zannichelliaceae)	(Pseudalthenia not found, Vleisia Toml. & Posl.: Zannichelliaceae)	Pseudalthenia Nakai (including Vleisia Tomlinson & Posluszny)
(in Zannichellia L.: Zannichelliaceae)	(in Zannichellia: Zannichelliaceae)	(in Zannichellia L.: Zannichelliaceae)	Zannichellia L.
Zannichelliaceae
1. Zannichellia L.	Zannichellia	Zannichellia L.	(in Zannichellia L.: Potamogetonaceae)
2. Pseudalthenia Nakai (including Vleisia)	Pseudalthenia (excluding Vleisia)	(name not found)	(in Pseudalthenia: Potamogetonaceae)
3. Althenia Petit (excluding Lepilaena Drumm. ex. Harv.)	Althenia (excluding Lepilaena)	Althenia F.Petit (excluding Lepilaena J.L.Drumm. ex Harv.)	Althenia Petit (including Lepilaena Harvey)
4. Lepilaena Drumm. ex. Harv.	Lepilaena	Lepilaena J.L.Drumm. ex Harv.	(in Althenia Petit)
(in Pseudalthenia)	Vleisia	Vleisia Toml. & Posl.	(in Pseudalthenia: Potamogetonaceae)
