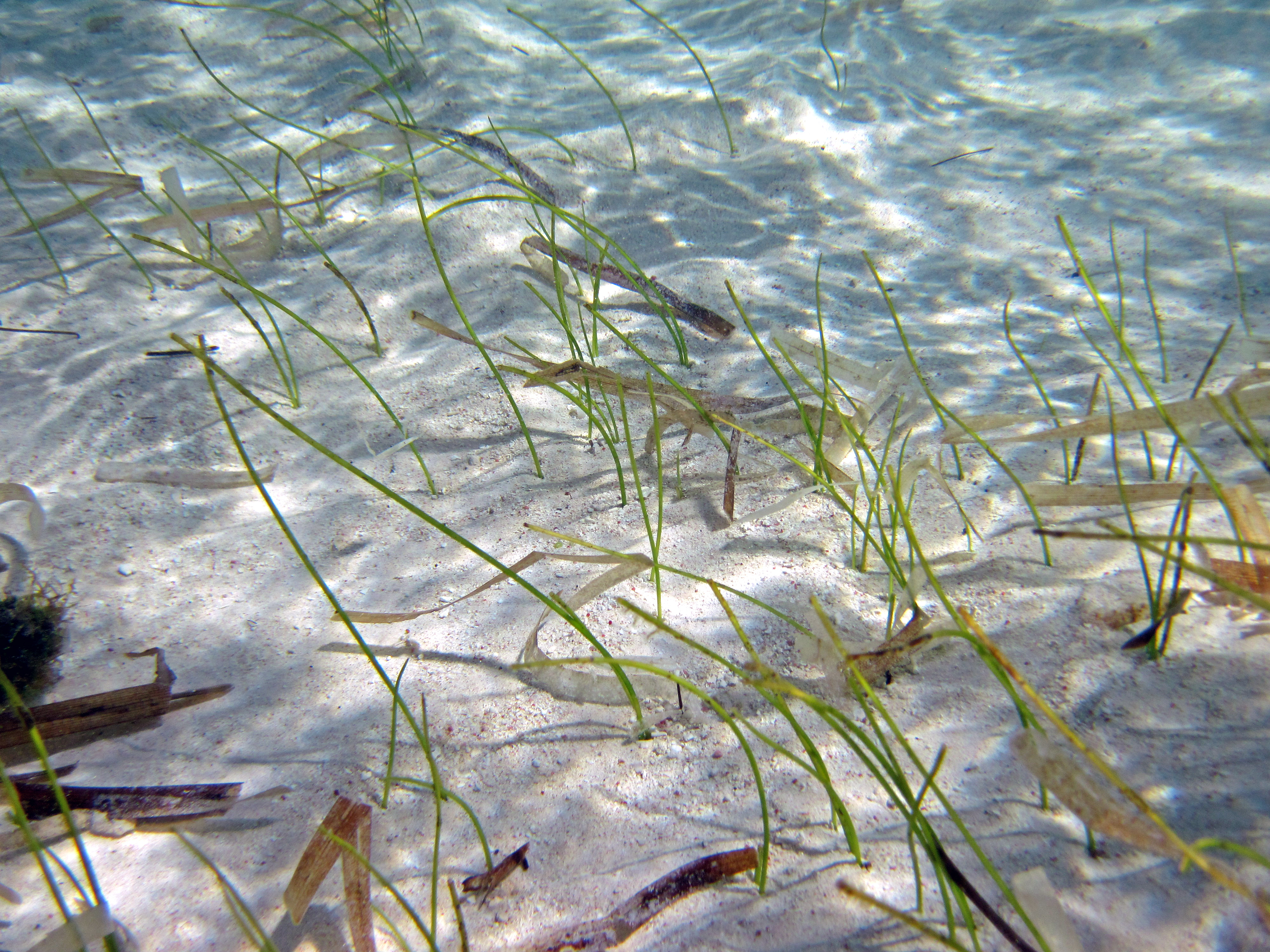

Conservation status
- Least Concern (IUCN 3.1)

Scientific classification
- Kingdom: Plantae
- Clade: Embryophytes
- Clade: Tracheophytes
- Clade: Spermatophytes
- Clade: Angiosperms
- Clade: Monocots
- Order: Alismatales
- Family: Cymodoceaceae
- Genus: Syringodium
- Species: S. filiforme

Binomial name
- Syringodium filiforme Kütz.

= Syringodium filiforme =

Species of aquatic plant

Syringodium filiforme, commonly known as manatee grass, is a species of marine seagrass. It forms meadows in shallow sandy or muddy locations in the Caribbean Sea and the Gulf of Mexico, and is also found in the Bahamas and Bermuda. It occurs to a depth of about 20 m (66 ft), and even deeper where water is very clear.

== Climate change ==
Manatee seagrasses are a flowering plant that thrives in shallow saltwater around the coast of Florida. Worldwide, manatee seagrass is experiencing a global decline due to ever-changing events in its environment. These descendants of terrestrial plants that were able to survive over 65 million years of evolution are now facing being wiped from the planet due to climate change and other anthropogenic factors. Currently, under the IUCN, these plants are listed as of least concern (Short, Frederick T. et al., 2011).

As of 2010, there were 10 seagrass species at high risk of extinction. While three were considered endangered. With seagrass species loss comes biodiversity loss. This paper studies not only human impact on seagrass beds but also global climate change and how changing environments are impacting seagrasses worldwide (Short, Frederick T. et al., 2011). Understanding the importance of manatee grass will help direct efforts towards saving them from global climate change. Seagrass meadows provide many ecological benefits and rank among the highest ecosystems on the earth. The roots and rhizomes of seagrasses stabilise sediments and prevent erosion of the land. Their leaves filter suspended nutrients from the water column. This, in turn,n links them to coral reefs, mangroves, salt marshes, and even oyster reefs (Bjork, Mats, et al.).

Seagrasses are distributed through six main global bioregions: Temperate North Atlantic, Tropical Atlantic, Mediterranean, Temperate North Pacific, Tropical Indo-Pacific and Temperate Southern Oceans. Throughout all regions, they are used as medicine, food, and their main source of contribution to humans is their sediment-trapping and binding capacities. The leaves act as a trap and collect materials brought to the seagrass meadows. In turn, this helps keep the ecosystem clear and clean of any material (Bjork, Mats, et al.).

Unfortunately, much like other environments in the world, human development can alter the ecology of the seagrasses, and therefore, the coast of Florida is starting to lose high densities of this type of ecosystem. Natural disturbances are also playing a major role in habitat loss. Global Climate change refers to the increase of CO_{2} and other greenhouse gases in the atmosphere. CO_{2} has increased from 280ppt in 1880 to 380 in 2005. The most common consequence of increasing CO_{2} levels on seagrasses is an increase in photosynthesis and growth. This increase in photosynthesis raises the HCO3-level, which lowers the water pH (Bjork, Mats, et al.).

A study done by Heck, KL, et al., recorded levels throughout most temperate and polar environments. A well-studied effect from this was that of climate, causing a shift in tropical aquatic species. Aquatic species in the Northern Gulf of Mexico are currently migrating there due to climate and finding food sources; many native animals are being outcompeted for their own food. Thus, manatee grasses are being overgrazed, resulting in fewer nursery areas for native species that rely on the meadows.

As of 2011, Florida had a management plan to develop sage channels for seagrass restoration along certain docks, marinas and channels. As climate change affects the shifts of certain animals, such as the manatee, a legal framework is put into action. Although this may increase manatee sea growth in certain areas. This issue at hand becomes whether or not these seagrasses will continue to grow in native areas to protect the coast of Florida from erosion, keep manatees alive, and to ensure this ecosystem doesn't fail.

== Physical oceanography ==
Manatee seagrasses receive considerable amount of effects from the ocean. These effects range from salinity, temperature, sun, and climate. In 2004, the Loxahatchee River estuary was effected by two hurricanes (Frances and Jeanne) causing considerable amount of damage to these sea grass beds. These hurricane devastations were monitored for 12-15 months with little recovery of the grass beds. The most likely cause was from the salinity amount that the hurricanes brought in to this estuary (Ridler, Mary S., et al.)

The Loxahatchee River estuary encompasses 400 ha and drains 700 km2 from the Palm Beach County watershed. The watershed has been influenced by a hydrology system that controls flood effects to human populations. Hurricanes Frances and Jeanne affected the Loxahatchee River watershed in September 2004 with high winds, heavy rainfall, and excessive freshwater runoff. Hurricanes Frances and Jeanne produced 610 mm of rainfall and resulted in excessive freshwater influx to the estuary. This caused a negative affected of salinity, light availability, and water quality in the Loxahatchee River Estuary. Freshwater discharges resulting from the hurricanes severely damaged manatee seagrass beds, nearly wiping out the entire colony in the estuary.(Ridler, Mary S., et al.)

The occurrence, density, and biomass of S.filiforme declined intensley following the September 2004 hurricanes. Variability in species and coverage extent of seagrass communities in the Loxahatchee River Estuary has been observed and documented by local agencies since the 1980s.The present study shows the effect of the September 2004 hurricanes on S. filiforme based upon 15 mo of pre-hurricane and 12 mo of post-hurricane data. The hurricanes of 2004 resulted in hurricane force winds and extreme influx of freshwater which appears to have affected S. filiforme. Seagrass occurrence and density was reduced immediately following the hurricanes (Ridler, Mary S., et al.)

As known, hurricanes can have huge impacts around the globe. Today it is extremely important to continuously monitor post hurricane effects, especially on grass beds that are vastly important in keeping endangered animals such as the manatee alive. Seagrass beds also play an ecological role such as nurseries for many animals. Further studies and monitoring should be done to contribute to the growth and well being of these area of study along with other contributors to the water system of Loxahatchee River Estuary.
