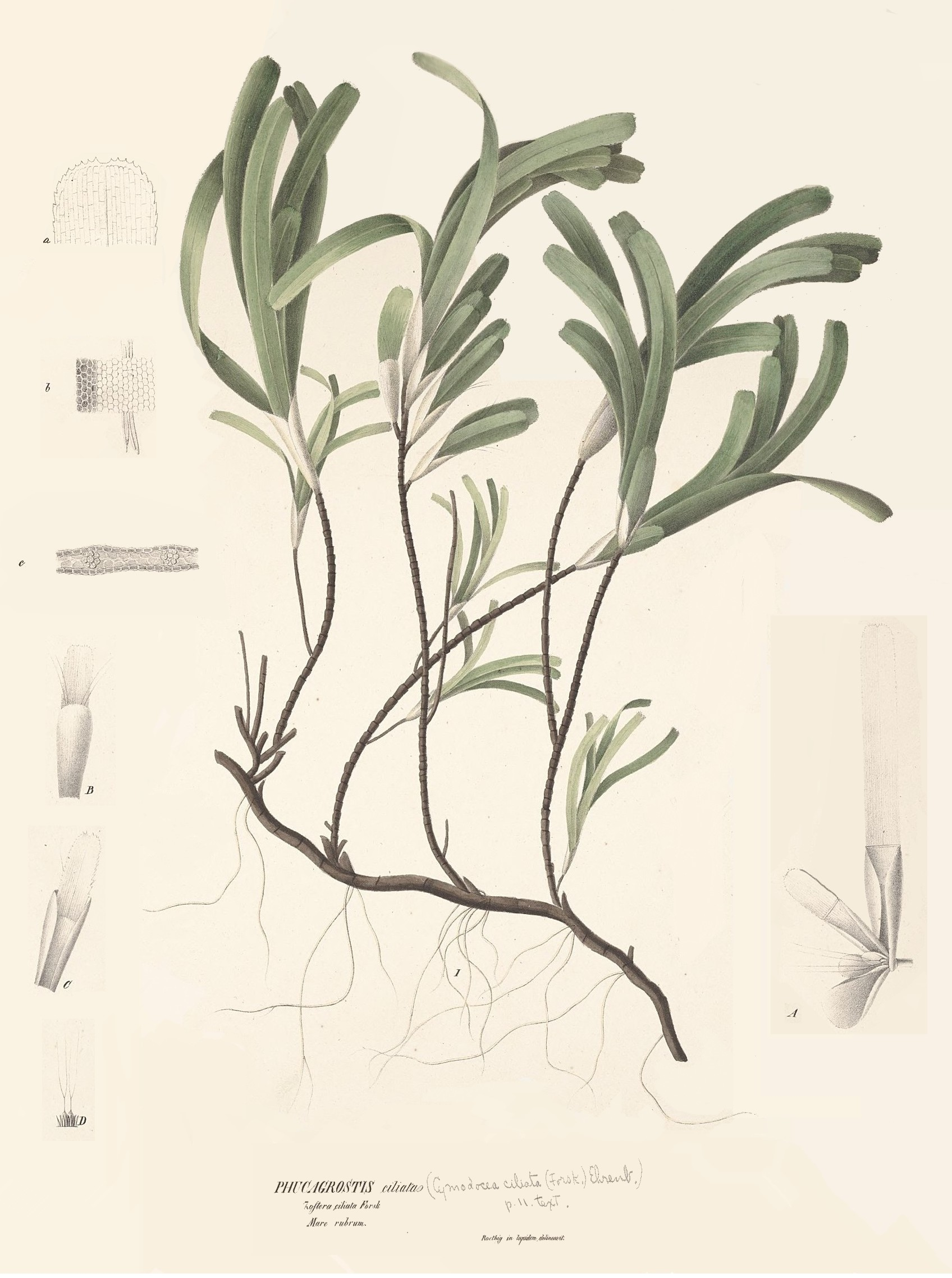

Conservation status
- Least Concern (IUCN 3.1)

Scientific classification
- Kingdom: Plantae
- Clade: Tracheophytes
- Clade: Angiosperms
- Clade: Monocots
- Order: Alismatales
- Family: Cymodoceaceae
- Genus: Thalassodendron
- Species: T. ciliatum

Binomial name
- Thalassodendron ciliatum (Forssk.) Hartog

Synonyms
- Cymodocea ciliata (Forsk.) Ehr. ex Aschers

= Thalassodendron ciliatum =

Species of aquatic plant

Thalassodendron ciliatum, the sickle-leaved cymodocea, is a species of plant in the Thalassodendron genus of seagrasses in the family Cymodoceaceae.

== Distribution ==
Thalassodendron ciliatum has a wide distribution throughout the Indo-Pacific region, but has variable abundances throughout its range. This seagrass has been recorded from the western Philippines to Borneo and Singapore, Indonesia, Papua New Guinea, the Caroline Islands, Vanuatu, Australia, India and the Maldives. It is also common from the Gulf of Oman to the Red Sea down to South Africa, Madagascar, the Seychelles, the Comores, the Mascarenes and parts of Malesia and the Solomon Islands.

== Thalassodendron ciliatum facts ==
1. Thalassodendron ciliatum has a wide distribution throughout the Indo-Pacific region, but has variable abundances throughout its range.
2. Thalassodendron ciliatum is typically found in the upper part of the sublittoral zone to depths down to 17 meters.
3. Dense monospecific meadows form in deeper localities on sandy bottoms, coral reefs and sand-covered rocks.
4. Thalassodendron ciliatum is a fast-growing seagrass; however, it is slow to re-colonize.

This species is susceptible to intense grazing by sea urchins. Anthropogenic stressors on this species include coastal development, pollution, eutrophication, seaweed farming, beach seines and drag net trawling.

== Leaf morphology ==
Red or red striped leaves, Linear and falcate.10–15 cm long and 6-13mm wide with an average width of 10mm, Leaf margins are almost entire with serrations visible towards the tip, Leaf sheath is wide and compressed and measuring 15-30mm long and appears pink in color.

== Rhizome, stem and roots ==
Thick, well-developed rhizome up to 0.5 cm thick with the mat formed by the rhizome approximately 5–10 cm thick. One to two stems are present at every fourth internode along the rhizome, the first stem is either unbranched or slightly branched and 10–65 cm long while The second stem is usually under-developed, if present, and in the form of a bud. Roots occur in groups of 1-5 and range from slightly to highly branched and occur on the internode before the stem.
