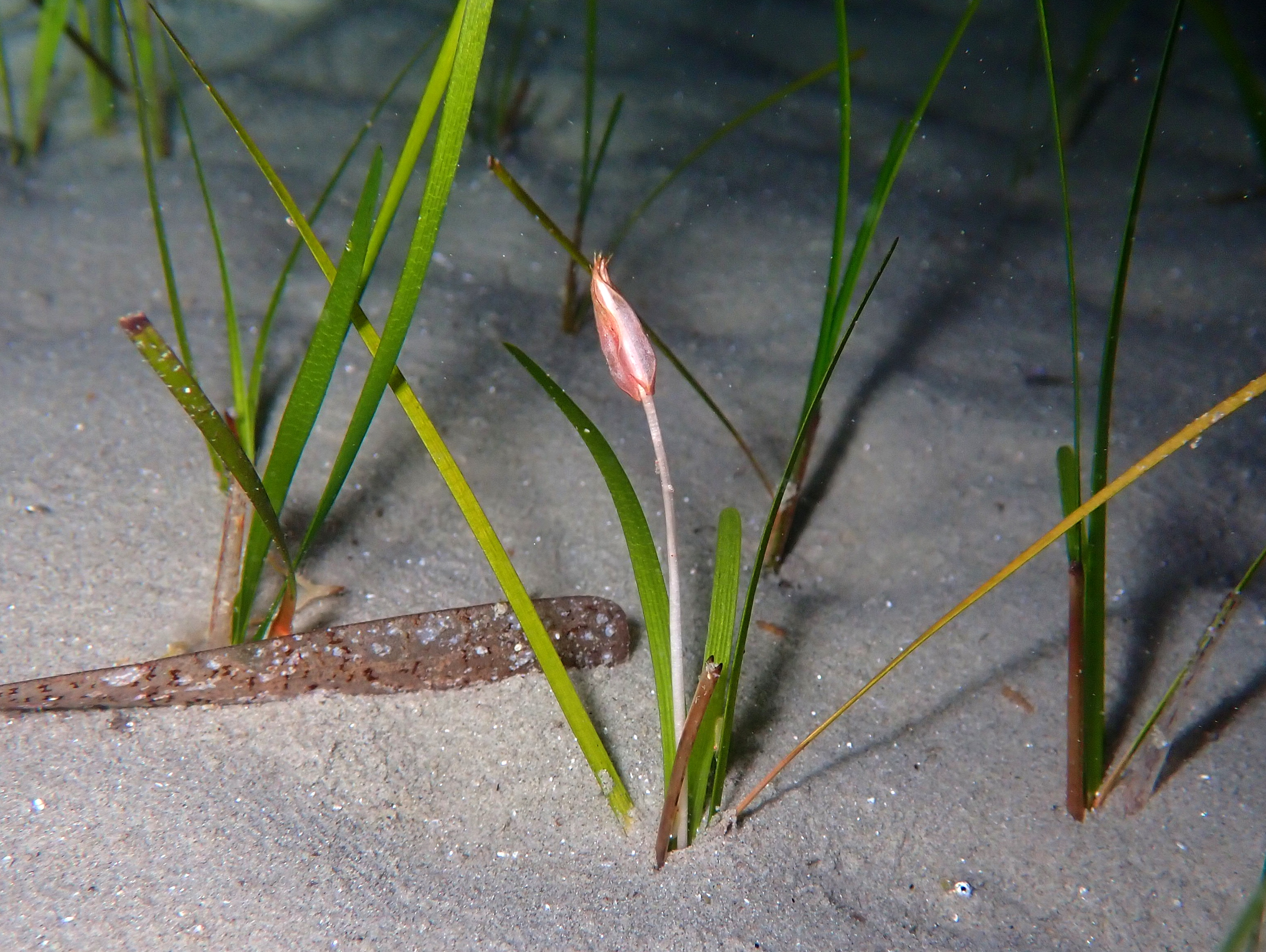
- Blossoming Cymodocea nodosa off the coast of Corsica

Conservation status
- Least Concern (IUCN 3.1)

Scientific classification
- Kingdom: Plantae
- Clade: Tracheophytes
- Clade: Angiosperms
- Clade: Monocots
- Order: Alismatales
- Family: Cymodoceaceae
- Genus: Cymodocea
- Species: C. nodosa

Binomial name
- Cymodocea nodosa (Ucria) Asch. (1870)

Synonyms
- Cymodocea aequorea K.D.Koenig; Cymodocea major (Willd.) Grande; Cymodocea preauxiana Webb & Berthel. Cymodocea webbiana A.Juss. Phucagrostis major Theophr. ex Cavolini; Phucagrostis nodosa (Ucria) Kuntze; Kernera nodosa (Ucria) Schult. & Schult.f. Zostera mediterranea DC. Zostera nodosa Ucria

= Cymodocea nodosa =

Species of plant in the manatee-grass family

Cymodocea nodosa is a species of seagrass in the family Cymodoceaceae and is sometimes known as little Neptune grass. As a seagrass, it is restricted to growing underwater and is found in shallow parts of the Mediterranean Sea and certain adjoining areas of the Atlantic Ocean.

== Description ==
C. nodosa has light green or greyish-green leaves. They are very narrow but may be up to 40 centimetres (16 in) long. Each leaf has seven to nine veins running along its length. The plant produces rhizomes which are only 1 mm in diameter and have leaf scars at intervals. Inconspicuous grass-like flowers are sometimes produced at the end of long stems in the spring when water temperatures begin to rise after their winter minimum. The pollen is liberated into the sea and the seeds remain dormant until the following spring.

== Distribution and habitat ==
This seagrass is found in shallow parts of the Mediterranean Sea and the adjoining parts of the Atlantic Ocean, the coasts of Portugal, Mauritania and Senegal and round the Canary Islands and Madeira. It grows at depths of down to nineteen metres in sandy sediments in sheltered locations and needs clear waters for photosynthesis. Off the Catalan coast in the western Mediterranean, a single meadow of this grass covering at least 800 hectares (2,000 acres) has been discovered.

== Ecology ==
Cymodocea nodosa grows in meadows on the seabed and is sometimes associated with the other seagrasses, Zostera noltii and Posidonia oceanica and the seaweeds Caulerpa prolifera and Caulerpa racemosa. Although it is adversely affected by mechanical disturbance such as trawling and by pollution, and although it is in competition with other seagrass species, C. nodosa is not considered to be threatened.

In the Canary Islands, fifty-three species of epiphytic algae were found to grow on the leaves and rhizomes of C. nodosa. Many of these were encrusting species of Corallinaceae.

Seagrass meadows have high biological productivity and are rich, biodiverse habitats. Fish species associated with C. nodosa in a coastal lagoon in south east Spain include Atherina boyeri, Pomatoschistus marmoratus, Liza aurata, Liza saliens, Syngnathus abaster and Aphanius iberus. The meadows are an important rearing ground for juvenile fish. Invertebrates associated with seagrass meadows include polychaete worms, amphipods, isopods, decapods and molluscs.

C. nodosa tends to grow in patches. This is because it favours unstable sandy sediments and subaqueous dunes tend to move over time. If the sand accretion is not too fast, the stolons can grow vertically through it, but the seagrass can be overwhelmed by rapid accretion. Patch death was mostly caused by erosion as roots were uncovered, encrusting and drilling organisms increased and plants were swept away. The dune movement cycle tended to take two to six years, which gives the seagrass time to recolonise bare areas. Sand accretion also stimulates flowering and dormant seeds can enable recolonisation when conditions allow it.

The fact that the pattern of C. nodosa growth changes as sand is deposited provides a means of measuring the travel of subaqueous dunes. In the Alfacs Bay in the northwest Mediterranean Sea, it was found that the rate of dune advance averaged 13 metres (43 ft) per year, and that the seagrasses could be used to monitor movement rates ranging from 0.15 metres (5.9 in) to 980 metres (3,220 ft) per year.

The invasive alga Caulerpa taxifolia is often associated with C. nodosa. It has an extensive rhizoidal system that anchors it to a sandy substrate. The alga is better able to extract nutrients from the substrate than can the seagrass. A study was undertaken near the island of Elba, Italy, in which slow release fertiliser sticks were added to test plots of the seabed where the seagrass and alga both grew. It was found that although both species responded with increased growth rates, the seagrass was relatively disadvantaged in that increased growth of the alga restricted the amount of sunlight reaching the seagrass whereas the alga was less constrained by limited light.
