= Amphibolis antarctica =

Conservation status
- Least Concern (IUCN 3.1)

Scientific classification
- Kingdom: Plantae
- Clade: Embryophytes
- Clade: Tracheophytes
- Clade: Spermatophytes
- Clade: Angiosperms
- Clade: Monocots
- Order: Alismatales
- Family: Cymodoceaceae
- Genus: Amphibolis
- Species: A. antarctica

Binomial name
- Amphibolis antarctica (Labill.) Asch.

Synonyms
- Amphibolis bicornis C.Agardh; Amphibolis zosterifolia C.Agardh; Cymodocea antarctica (Labill.) Endl. Cymodocea zosterifolia (C.Agardh) F.Muell. Graumuellera antarctica (Labill.) B.D.Jacks. Pectinella antarctica (Labill.) J.M.Black; Phucagrostis antarctica (Labill.) Rupr. Caulinia antarctica (Labill.) R.Br. Thalassia antarctica (Labill.) F.Muell. ex Asch. Kernera antarctica (Labill.) Schult. & Schult.f. Posidonia antarctica (Labill.) Spreng. Ruppia antarctica Labill.

Species of plant in the manatee-grass family

Amphibolis antarctica is a species of flowering plant in the family Cymodoceaceae. It is referred to by the common names wire weed or sea nymph, and is a seagrass found in coastal waters of southern and western Australia.

== Description ==
It is a herbaceous perennial up to 80 centimetres (31 in) high. It has shorter leaves than the other Amphibolis species, A. griffithii. Its flowers are green, and appear from September to February.

== Taxonomy ==
First published as Ruppia antarctica by Jacques Labillardière in 1807, it has since been moved into numerous genera. It was named Caulinia antarctica by Robert Brown in 1810, Posidonia antarctica by C. P. J. Sprengel in 1824, Cymodocea antarctica by C. S. Kunth in 1841, and Phucagrostis antarctica by F. J. Ruprecht in 1852. It was finally placed in Amphibolis by Paul Friedrich August Ascherson in 1868, but in 1913 J. M. Black renamed it Pectinella antarctica. Since 1977 it is widely accepted as belonging to Amphibolis.

== Distribution and habitat ==
The species is generally reported as occurring from Exmouth Gulf on the north-west coast of Western Australia, south along the west coast and east along the south coast as far as Wilsons Promontory in Victoria. However FloraBase reports an isolated specimen record from east of Port Hedland, over 500 kilometres (310 mi) north-east of Exmouth Gulf.

It occur primarily in the sublittoral zone, where it forms extensive meadows. It can occur as deep as 27 metres (89 ft), but does not often form meadows below 13 metres (43 ft). It can also grow in extremely shallow waters, with its leaves floating on the surface, although this often results in leaf damage and loss. The species tolerates a range of habitats. It has been found growing on a variety of substrates, including sand-covered rock, gravel, sand and clay. It grows in areas of both high and low water flow, and occurs in areas of very high salinity.
