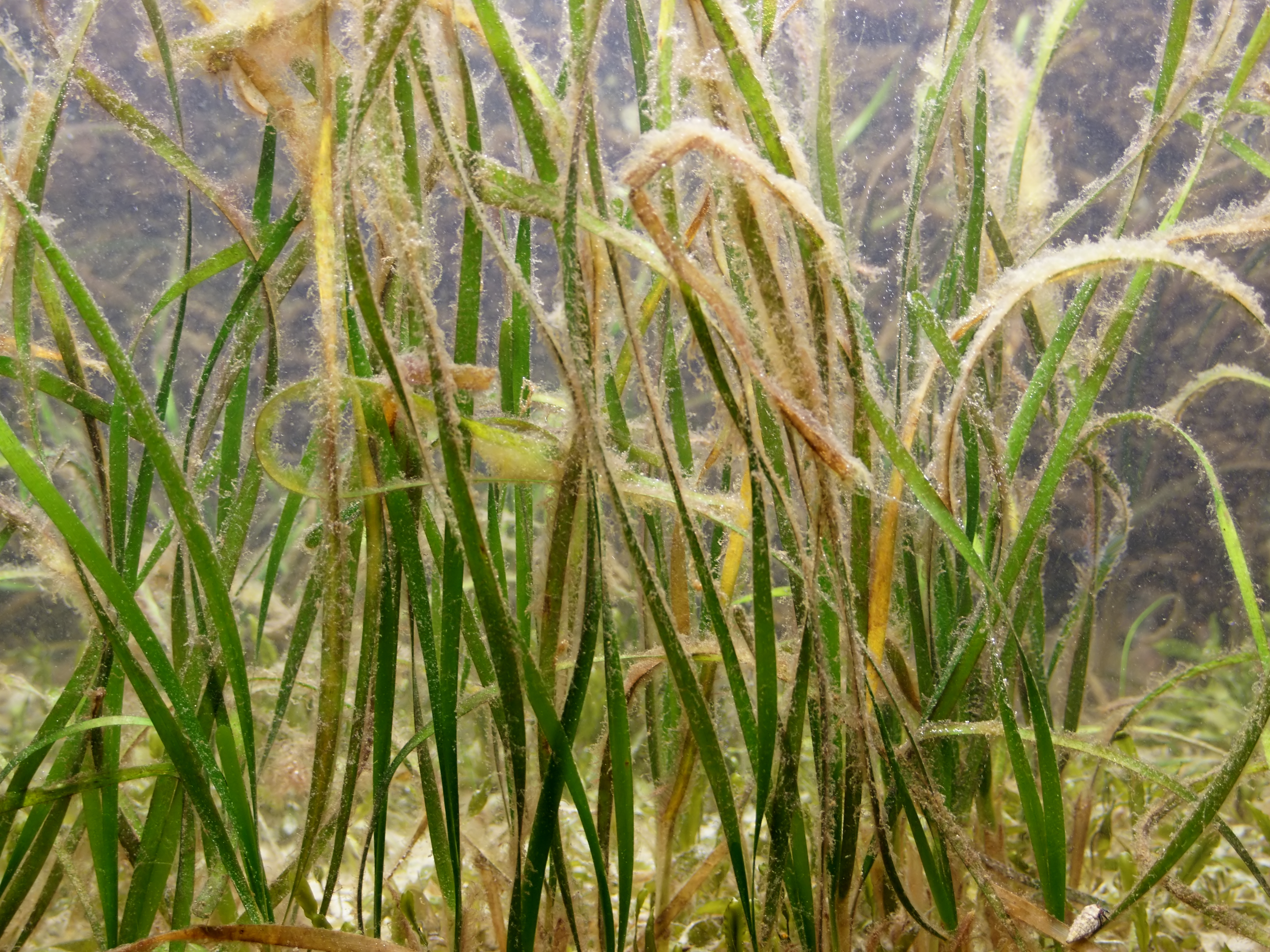

Conservation status
- Least Concern (IUCN 3.1)

Scientific classification
- Kingdom: Plantae
- Clade: Tracheophytes
- Clade: Angiosperms
- Clade: Monocots
- Order: Alismatales
- Family: Cymodoceaceae
- Genus: Halodule
- Species: H. wrightii

Binomial name
- Halodule wrightii Asch 1868

Synonyms
- Diplanthera beaudettei Hartog; Diplanthera dawsonii Hartog; Diplanthera wrightii (Asch.) Asch.; Halodule beaudettei (Hartog) Hartog; Halodule brasiliensis Lipkin

= Halodule wrightii =

Species of plant in the manatee-grass family

Halodule wrightii is an aquatic plant in the Cymodoceaceae family. It is referred to by the common names shoal grass or shoalweed, and is a plant species native to seacoasts of some of the warmer oceans of the world.

H. wrightii is an herb growing in salt-water marshes in intertidal regions, often submerged at high tide but emergent at low tide.

== Taxonomy ==
This plant was named after Charles Wright, who was an American botanist and collector. In 1853 and 1856 Wright participated in a surveying expedition and discovered Halodule wrightii.

Some publications cite US specimens by the synonym, Halodule beaudettei, but the two names represent the same species.

== Description ==
Seagrass is a marine angiosperm that possesses conductive tissue, shoot systems, rhizomes and flowers. It has flat leaves up to 20 cm (7.9 in) long, dark reddish-brown, with a few teeth on the margins. The fruits are spherical to egg-shaped, about 2 mm across.

== Distribution ==
This plant is mainly found in muddy coastal marsh waters and off the coast of many Caribbean islands. It has been reported from Texas, Florida, Louisiana, Mississippi, Alabama, North Carolina, Maryland, Yucatán, Quintana Roo, Tabasco, Costa Rica, Belize, Panama, Cuba, Trinidad and Tobago, Venezuela, Brazil and Cape Verde.

In California, it was intentionally introduced into the Salton Sea from Texas almost a century ago, but died out a long time ago.

== Ecology ==
These aquatic plants form sea beds and increase habitat stabilization through constant shoot and rhizome production. The string-like structure of the seagrass decrease water turbidity and movement of substrate whether it is sand or mud. Seagrass beds function as an incubator for young juvenile fishes. They provide shelter from predators and reduce competition with other species. Halodule wrightii also supplies food resources to several species of fish, invertebrate marine life and manatees. This species of plant has the ability to adapt to various levels of salinity and temperatures.

H. wrightii is able to reproduce sexually and asexually, however, flowering in this species is rare.

== Conservation ==
Recreational activities, like jet skiing and boating, damage and uproot seagrass beds with ease in shallow coastal waters. Studies such as the one performed in Brazil's Abrolhos Marine National Park tested the direct effects of anchor damage caused by intense boating activity, and found that H. wrightii abundance was deeply impacted.

=== Restoration ===
Restoration of seagrass beds has been experimentally tested many times. One such experiment in Florida attempted to use H. wrightii as a pioneer species to stimulate natural succession to the eventual climax vegetation dominated by Thalassia testudinum. The experiment found that the application of fertilizer to transplants greatly increased their growth rate.
