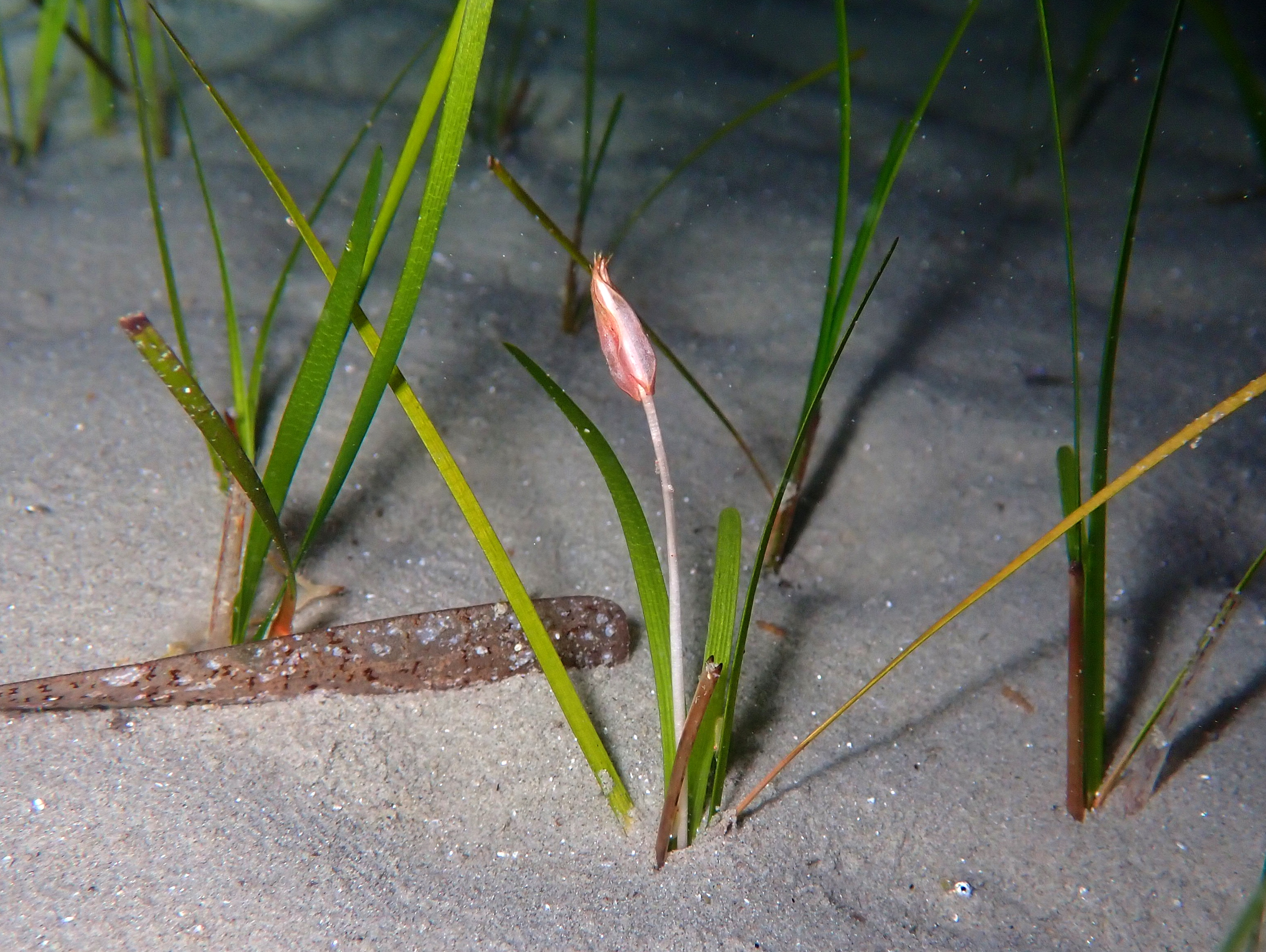
- Blossoming C. nodosa off the coast of Corsica

Scientific classification
- Kingdom: Plantae
- Clade: Tracheophytes
- Clade: Angiosperms
- Clade: Monocots
- Order: Alismatales
- Family: Cymodoceaceae
- Genus: Cymodocea; K.D.Koenig
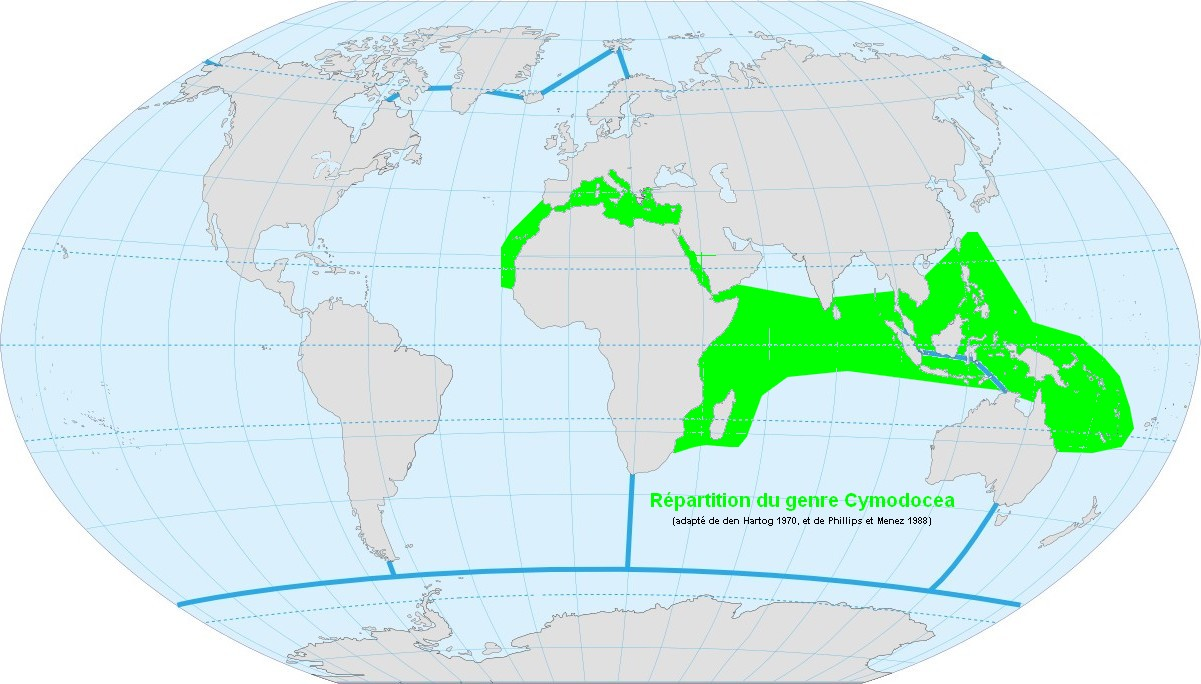

Synonyms
- Phucagrostis Cavolini, 1792, rejected name, not Willd. 1806; Phucagrostis Willd. 1806 illegitimate homonym not Cavolini 1792

= Cymodocea =

Genus of aquatic plants

Cymodocea is a genus in the family Cymodoceaceae described as a genus in 1805. It includes three species of sea grass distributed in warm oceans.

== Habitat ==
Cymodocea can be found in clear water and in the high intertidal areas. It is a hardy species and it is adaptable to marginal conditions. Just like other intertidal species, it can commonly be confused with other species of its kind. This species can not handle full exposure at low tide and dry conditions.

== Population ==
Cymodocea is not under any threat to become an endangered species, and it is a widespread species in the locations that it is found. The only threats that can be recorded are coastal development and other anthropogenic activity.

== Location ==
Cymodocea is native to the following countries:

- Australia
- China
- Egypt
- India
- Indonesia
- Japan
- Kenya
- Madagascar
- Malaysia
- Malta
- Marshall Islands
- Mayotte
- Micronesia
- Mozambique
- New Caledonia
- Palau
- Papua New Guinea
- Philippines
- Saudi Arabia
- Seychelles
- Singapore
- Tanzania
- Thailand
- United States Minor Outlying Islands
- Vanuatu
- Yemen

== Species ==
Three species are accepted.

- Cymodocea angustata Ostenf. - northwestern Australia
- Cymodocea nodosa (Ucria) Asch. - Mediterranean from Portugal to Israel; coast of NW Africa as far south as Senegal; Canary Islands
- Cymodocea rotundata Asch. & Schweinf. - shores of Indian Ocean, Red Sea, South China Sea, Pacific Ocean

=== Formerly placed here ===
- Oceana serrulata (R.Br.) Byng & Christenh. (as Cymodocea serrulata (R.Br.) Asch. & Magnus)
