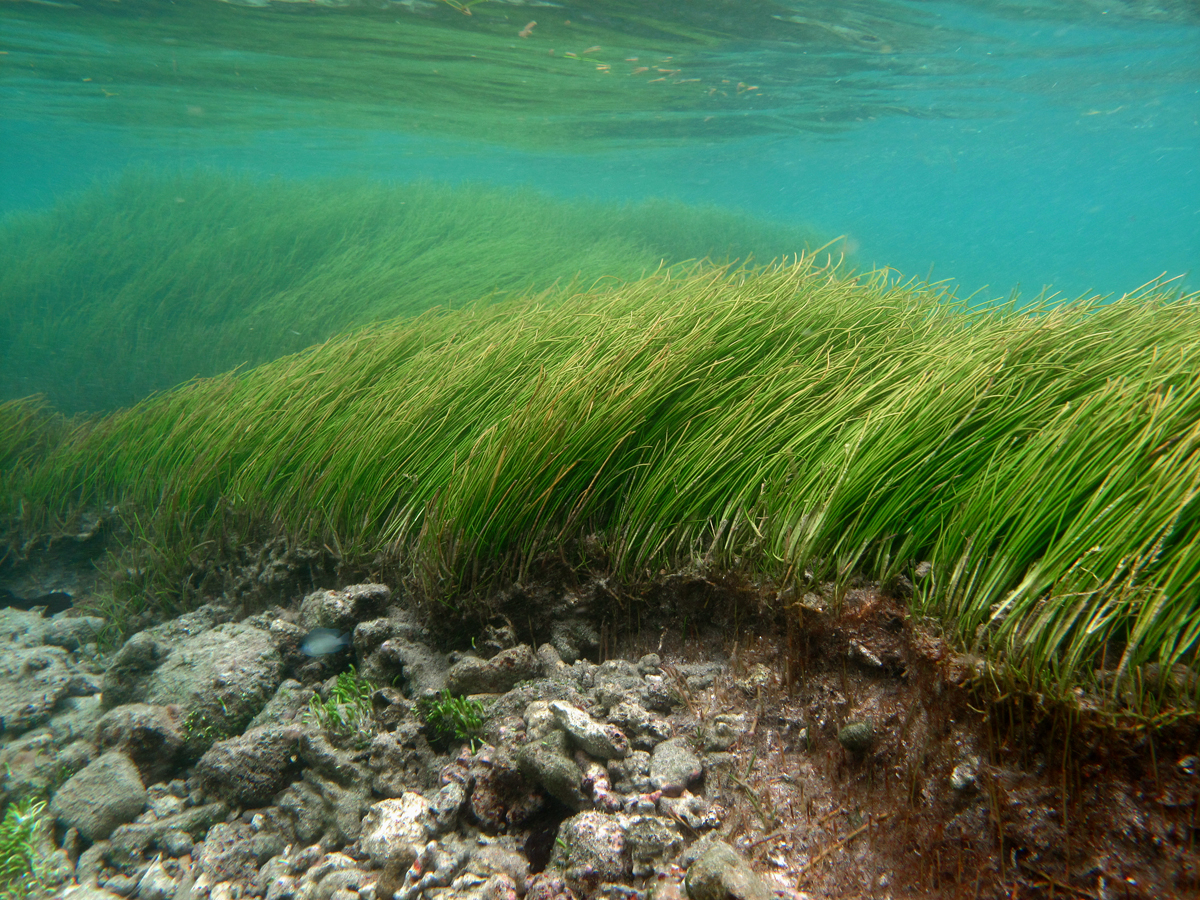
- Syringodium isoetifolium bending under the swell in Réunion.

Conservation status
- Least Concern (IUCN 3.1)

Scientific classification
- Kingdom: Plantae
- Clade: Tracheophytes
- Clade: Angiosperms
- Clade: Monocots
- Order: Alismatales
- Family: Cymodoceaceae
- Genus: Syringodium
- Species: S. isoetifolium

Binomial name
- Syringodium isoetifolium (Asch.) Dandy, 1939

= Syringodium isoetifolium =

Species of aquatic plant

Syringodium isoetifolium, commonly known as noodle seagrass, is a species of flowering plant in the family Cymodoceaceae, growing underwater in marine habitats. It forms seagrass meadows in shallow sandy or muddy locations in the Indian and Pacific Oceans.

== Description ==
Syringodium isoetifolium can grow to a length of 50 cm (20 in) in single species stands, but may only reach 5 to 10 cm (2 to 4 in) when growing with other seagrass species. The plant has slender underground rhizomes which send up shoots at intervals. The shoots are encased in a sheath at the base and each consists of two or three hollow, tubular leaves with smooth pointed tips. In calm waters, the shoots may be long and branched. The inflorescence is a cyme, with male and female flowers appearing on separate plants. The fruits are small, hard, beaked nuts. The plant is somewhat fragile; leaves may float when they break off, and so may the seed heads, often floating well away from the original location before the seeds germinate.

== Ecology ==
This seagrass is sensitive to light deprivation and a lowering of salinity in its environment. In a major flooding event in Queensland, half the seagrasses were lost in a shallow study area in Moreton Bay, the Syringodium isoetifolium disappearing almost completely while Zostera muelleri and other seagrass species survived, relatively unaffected. Another Australian study examined the likelihood of Syringodium isoetifolium becoming invasive if its range changed as a result of climate change. In this experiment, a small patch of Syringodium isoetifolium was established in a tropical subtidal area, and the area covered by the plant increased in size by 800% in a fifteen-year period, mostly through clonal growth.

== Research ==
Marine fouling causes much economic loss from organisms growing on the hulls of ships, pipelines and other submerged structures. Seagrasses have developed defence mechanisms against such epibionts, and few fouling organisms grow on them. A methanolic extract of Syringodium isoetifolium was assessed as a natural antifouling agent. It was found to inhibit growth of microalgae and biofilm bacteria, as well as the limpet Patella vulgata and the brown mussel Perna perna, all of which cause marine fouling. The extract was non-toxic to brine shrimps and showed promise as an agent to replace the toxic chemicals that have been used historically. The secondary metabolites involved seem to be fatty acids in the range C16 to C24.
