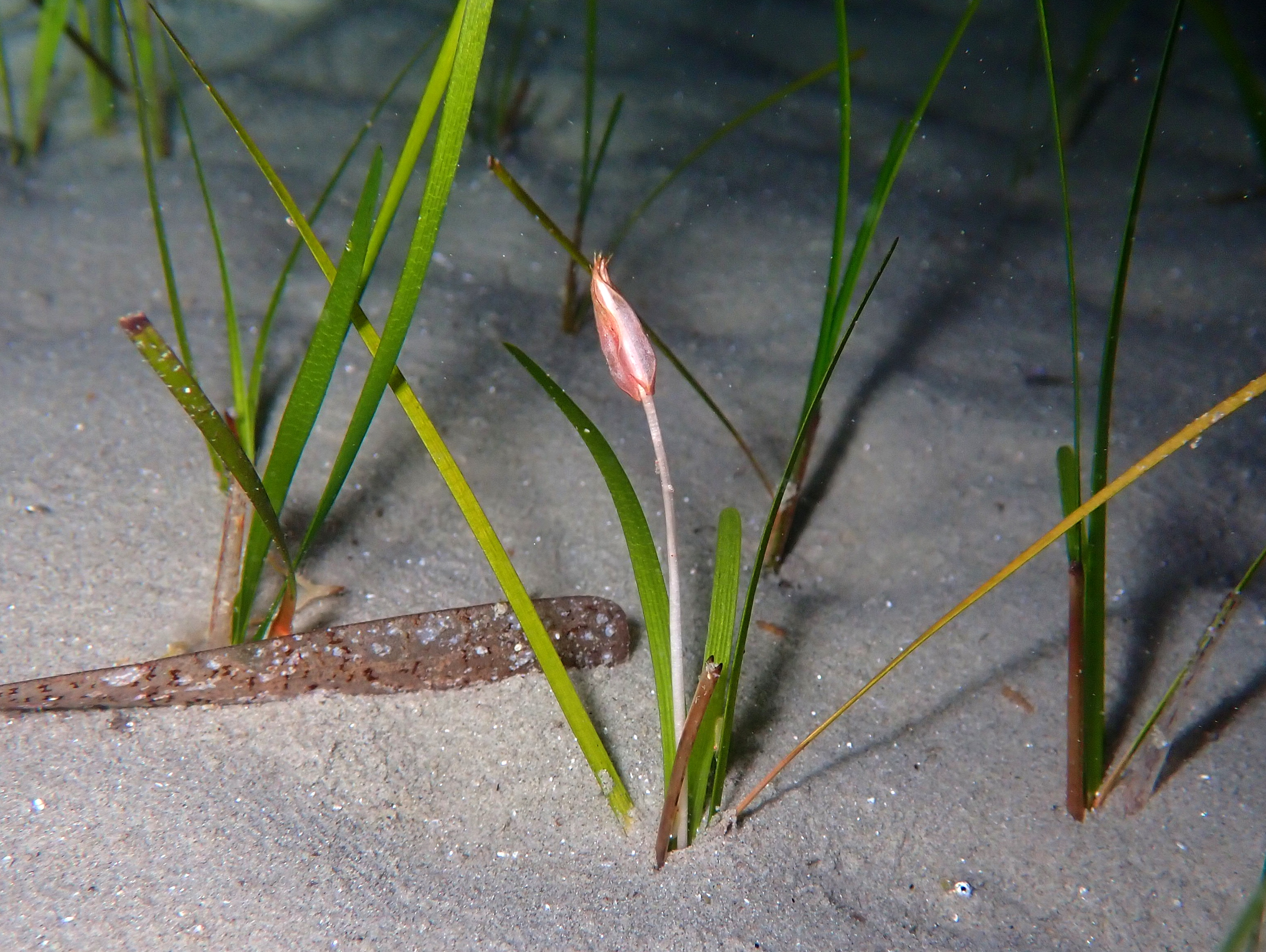

Scientific classification
- Kingdom: Plantae
- Clade: Tracheophytes
- Clade: Angiosperms
- Clade: Monocots
- Order: Alismatales
- Family: Cymodoceaceae; Vines

Genera
- Amphibolis C.Agardh; Cymodocea K.D.Koenig; Halodule Endl.; Oceana Byng & Christenh.; Syringodium Kütz.; Thalassodendron Hartog

= Cymodoceaceae =

Family of aquatic plants

Cymodoceaceae is a family of flowering plants, sometimes known as the "manatee-grass family", which includes only marine species.

The 2016 APG IV does recognize Cymodoceaceae and places it in the order Alismatales, in the clade monocots. The family includes five genera, totaling 17 species occurring in tropical seas and oceans (so-called seagrasses). According to the AP-Website it is doubtful if the family Ruppiaceae is distinct enough to be kept apart. The inclusion of the sole genus Ruppia in Ruppiaceae in Cymodoceaceae is being considered. The plants in the three families Cymodoceaceae, Posidoniaceae and Ruppiaceae form a monophyletic group.

- Cymodoceaceae
  - - - Amphibolis
      - Thalassodendron
    - - Cymodocea
      - Syringodium
  - Halodule

Its fossil record shows that Cymodoceaceae was established in its current Indo-West Pacific distribution by the early Eocene and perhaps even during the late Paleocene. Fossils of Thalassodendron auriculalopris den Hartog and Cymodocea floridana den Hartog (both extant) were also found in west-central Florida and date back to the late middle Eucene. Their age and lack of diversity speaks to an extremely slow rate of evolution within the Cymodoceaceae.

== Taxonomy ==
Marine grasses families: Zosteraceae, Cymodoceaceae, Ruppiaceae and Posidoniaceae. Related families: Potamogetonaceae, Zannichelliaceae (not consistently).

== Reproductive strategies ==
Cymodoceaceae is one of four families to have developed filamentous pollen, along with Ruppiaceae, Zosteraceae, and Posidonaceae. The pollen is assembled as long and thin grains rather than spheres, which increases its surface area when floating on the water. In addition, the pollen can more easily form pollen rafts, enabling distribution over a large surface area of water. The pollen is epihydrophilous (pollen distributed on the surface of the water) or hypohydrophilous (pollen distributed below the surface of the water) depending on the genera. There are three different methods used. Species in Halodule and Cymodocea release pollen at low tide, where it floats and assembles into snowflake-like pollen rafts which then hopefully make contact with the stigmas when the tide starts coming back in. Amphibolis and Thalassodendron have pollen that is carried up to and then released upon the surface of the water by abscisent male flowers. Syringodium has pollen grains that are approximately the same density as seawater and form small clumps which move beneath the surface by submarine currents to the stigmas of female flowers. This return to hypohydrophily is interpreted as a reversal to the ancestral state.

All species in Cymodoceaceae are dioecious. Although this occurs in about 75% of the seagrasses, it is a feature found in less than 5% of all angiosperms. There are two leading theories regarding the prevalence of dioecy in Cymodoceaceae. The construction and reception of pollen rafts are bulky operations. To have either perfect flowers or bear both male and female flowers on one plant could interfere with successful fertilization. The other theory is it would ensure cross-pollination in an environment that would make self-pollination much more likely, a process that would limit the gene pool and make plants more susceptible to variable conditions or disease.

Two genera have viviparous seedlings. The seeds of Amphibolis and Thalassodendron lack seed coats and do not store starch or other important nutrients. They instead latch onto the parent plant immediately after germination. The seedling develops a footing tissue from the hypocotyl, which attaches to the parents through transfer cells. The seedlings develop leafy shoots over the course of 7–12 months before being released. Amphibolis seedlings develop a grappling apparatus which serves to anchor the seedling to a substrate once released whereas the seedlings of Thalassodendron are released from an enveloping bract. As the external wall of the footing tissue in the seeds is apoplastic, the seedlings can be considered parasitic on and also cytoplasmically isolated from the maternal tissue.

Families and genera crosses (sea grasses)
Kubitzki (ed. 1998)	Watson & Dallwitz (delta-intkey)	data.kew	APWeb (mobot.org)
Zosteraceae
1. Zostera L.	Zostera	Zostera L.	Zostera L. (including Heterozostera den Hartog, Macrozostera Tomlinson & Posluzny, Nanozostera Tomlinson & Posluzny, Zosterella J. K. Small)
2. Heterozostera den Hartog	Heterozostera	Heterozostera (Setch.) Hartog	(in Zostera)
3. Phyllospadix Hook.	Phyllospadix	Phyllospadix Hook.	Phyllospadix J. D. Hooker
Cymodoceaceae
1. Syringodium Kütz	Syringodium	Syringodium Kutz. (including Phycoschoenus (Asch.) Nakai )	(in Cymodocea)
2. Halodule Endl.	Halodule	Halodule Endl.	Halodule Endlicher
3. Cymodocea König	Cymodocea	Cymodocea K.Koenig	Cymodocea König (including Amphibolis Agardh ?, Syringodium Kütz. ?, Thalassodendron den Hartog ?)
4. Amphibolis Agardh	Amphibolis	Amphibolis C.Agardh (including Pectinella J.M.Black)	(in Cymodocea)
5. Thalassodendron de Hartog	(name not found)	Thalassodendron Hartog	(in Cymodocea)
Ruppiaceae
Ruppia L.	Ruppia	(in Ruppia L. in Potamogetonaceae)	Ruppia L.
Posidoniaceae
Posidonia König	Posidonia	Posidonia K.Koenig	Posidonia König

Species in Cymodoceaceae and their distribution
Species	Distribution
Cymodocea angustata	Northwestern Australia
Cymodocea nodosa	Mediterranean, Canary Islands, NW Africa
Cymodocea rotundata	Shores of Indian Ocean, Red Sea, South China Sea, Pacific Ocean
Halodule bermudensis	Bermuda
Halodule ciliata	Panama
Halodule emarginata	Southeastern Brazil
Halodule pinifolia	Southeast Asia, Ryukyu Islands, Fiji, Caroline Islands
Halodule uninervis	Indian and Pacific Oceans, Red Sea, Persian Gulf, Bay of Bengal
Halodule wrightii	Atlantic Ocean, Caribbean, Gulf of Mexico, Africa, West Indies
Oceana serrulata	Shores of Indian Ocean, Red Sea, South China Sea, Pacific Ocean
Syringodium filiforme	Gulf of Mexico, Caribbean
Syringodium isoetifolium	Indian and Pacific shores
Amphibolis antarctica	South and Western Australia
Amphibolis griffithii	South and Western Australia
Thalasodendron leptocaule	Mozambique, KwaZulu-Natal
Thalassodendron ciliatum	Indian Ocean, shores of Africa, Asia, Australia, Micronesia
Thalassodendron pachyrhizum	Western Australia
