= Apiogalacturonan =

Names
- Other names Galacturonoapian

Identifiers
CAS Number	9039-03-6
- Except where otherwise noted, data are given for materials in their standard state (at 25 °C [77 °F], 100 kPa). Infobox references

Apiogalacturonans are a type of pectin found in the cell walls of Lemna and Zostera marina. Substituted galacturonans are characterized by the presence of the saccharide appendant residue D-apiose in the case of apiogalacturonan, branching from a backbone of D-galacturonic acid residues. According to the Complex Carbohydrate Research Center, "[t]he backbone of these polysaccharides is resistant to fragmentation by microbial EPGs."

Lemnan belongs to rare apiogalacturonic pectic polysaccharides, along with zosteran from Zostera marina.

The apiogalacturonan in Lemna has been studied for several nutritional and biotechnology applications in animal models. In brief, it has been shown to have gastric-protection and immune-adjuvant properties. It is also cryoprotective and this application has been patented.

The apiogalacturonan from Zostera marina currently is used in a variety of cosmetic functions. The German group Beiersdorf AG holds several patents on the application of apiogalacturonan for cosmetic applications. Zostera marina L. was selected for its antioxidative activity and inhibition of matrix metalloproteinase-1 (MMP-1) expression.
