= Oceana serrulata =

Scientific classification
- Kingdom: Plantae
- Clade: Tracheophytes
- Clade: Angiosperms
- Clade: Monocots
- Order: Alismatales
- Family: Cymodoceaceae
- Genus: Oceana; Byng & Christenh.
- Species: O. serrulata

Binomial name
- Oceana serrulata (R.Br.) Byng & Christenh.

Synonyms
- Cymodocea acaulis Peter; Cymodocea asiatica Makino; Cymodocea serrulata (R.Br.) Asch. & Magnus; Phucagrostis serrulata (R.Br.) Kuntze; Caulinia serrulata R.Br.; Kernera serrulata (R.Br.) Schult. & Schult.f.; Posidonia serrulata (R.Br.) Spreng.; Thalassia reptans Sol. ex Graebn., not validly publ.; Zostera serrulata (R.Br.) Targ.Tozz.

Species of flowering plant

Oceana serrulata, commonly known as serrated ribbon seagrass, is a species of flowering plant in the family Cymodoceaceae. It is the sole species in genus Oceana. It is a marine rhizomatous hydrogeophyte native to the western and central Indo-Pacific region, ranging from the Red Sea and East African coast to Madagascar, tropical Asia, northern Australia, and the western Pacific.
