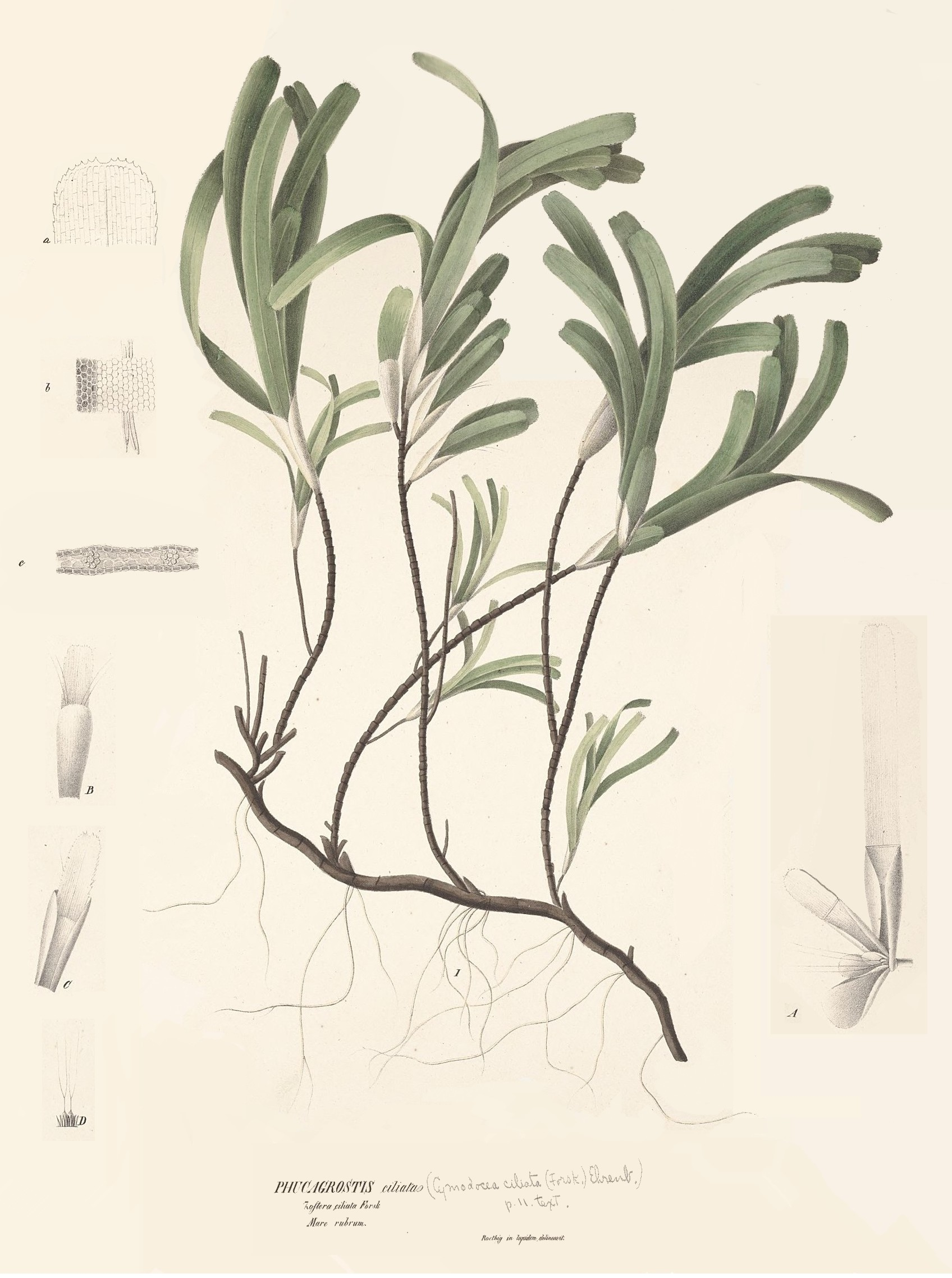
- Thalassodendron ciliatum

Scientific classification
- Kingdom: Plantae
- Clade: Tracheophytes
- Clade: Angiosperms
- Clade: Monocots
- Order: Alismatales
- Family: Cymodoceaceae
- Genus: Thalassodendron; Hartog

= Thalassodendron =

Genus of aquatic plants

Thalassodendron is a genus of seagrass in the family Cymodoceaceae, described as a genus in 1970. It grows along the shores of the Indian Ocean, the western Pacific Ocean and around Australasia.

The genus was circumscribed by Cornelis den Hartog in Verh. Kon. Ned. Akad. Wetensch., Afd. Natuurk., Sect. 2, vol.59 (1) on page 186 in 1970.

The genus name of Thalassodendron is named after Thalassa, the Greek word for the 'sea' and for its divine female personification in Greek mythology and dendron the Greek word for Tree.

== Species ==
As accepted by Kew;

- Thalassodendron ciliatum (Forssk.) Hartog - Islands of the Indian Ocean; shores of Africa, Asia, Australia, Micronesia
- Thalassodendron leptocaule Maria C.Duarte, Bandeira & Romeiras - Mozambique, KwaZulu-Natal
- Thalassodendron pachyrhizum Hartog - Western Australia
