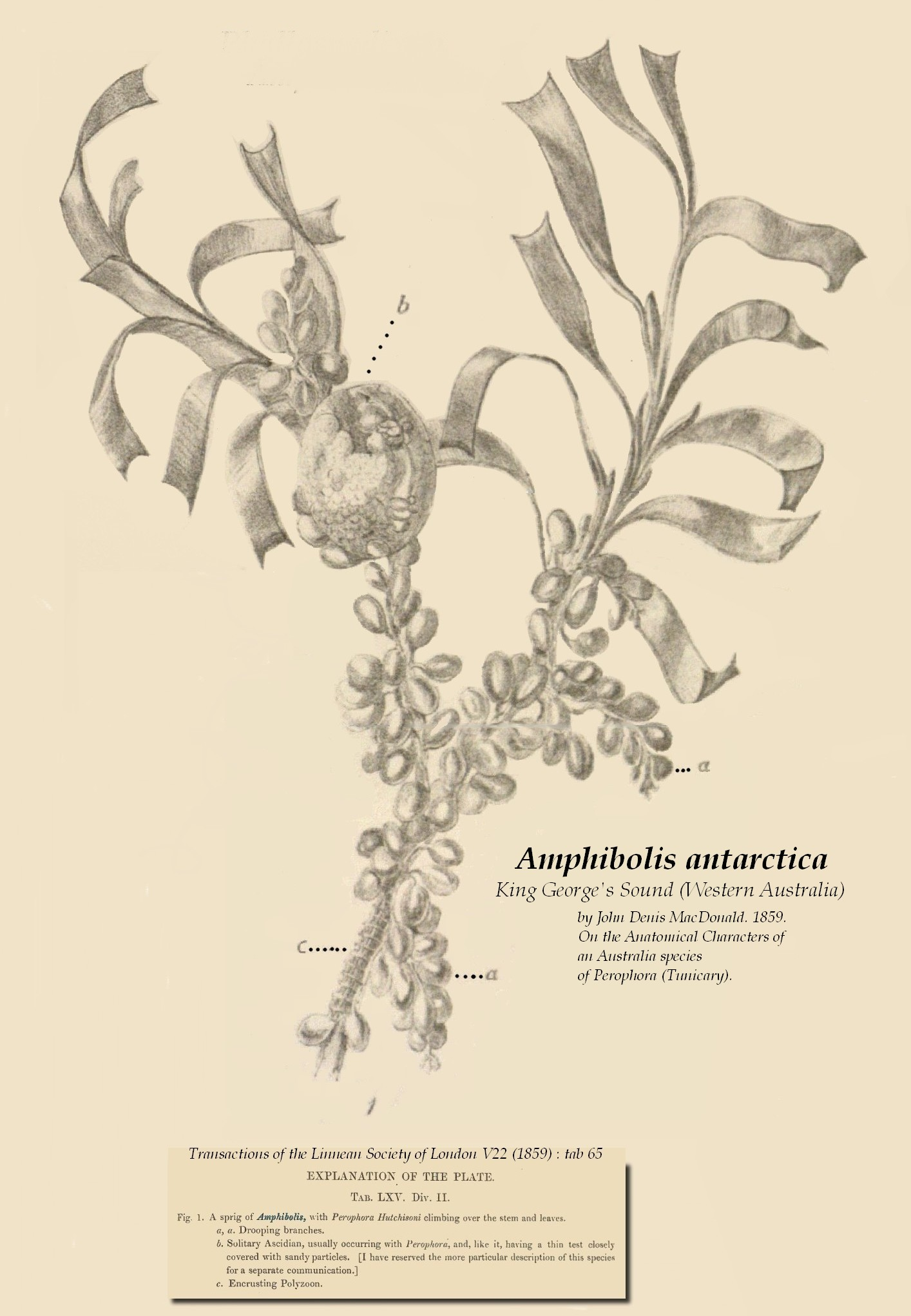
- Amphibolis antarctica

Scientific classification
- Kingdom: Plantae
- Clade: Embryophytes
- Clade: Tracheophytes
- Clade: Spermatophytes
- Clade: Angiosperms
- Clade: Monocots
- Order: Alismatales
- Family: Cymodoceaceae
- Genus: Amphibolis (Labillardière) Sonder & Ascherson ex Ascherson

Synonyms
- Graumuellera Rchb.; Pectinella J.M.Black

= Amphibolis =

Sea nymph or wire weed

Genus of aquatic plants

Amphibolis is a genus in the family Cymodoceaceae. It includes two species of sea grass endemic to the western and southern coast of Australia, Amphibolis antarctica and Amphibolis griffithii, commonly known as sea nymph or wire weed.

The seeds produce an anchoring comb of bristles while they mature on the female plant, giving the seedling a purchase when it arrives at a new site.

A type of seagrass, the plants of this genus forms meadows on calcareous sands. These meadows, and their consequent detritus, become an important source of food and shelter for a number of marine species. The interweaving roots and leaves consolidate the substrate of the ocean floor, protecting it from erosion by currents and wave action.

== Species ==
There are two species:

- Amphibolis antarctica (Labill.) Asch. - SA Tas Vic WA
- Amphibolis griffithii (J.M.Black) Hartog - SA WA
