= Friedrich Traugott Kützing =

German pharmacist, botanist and phycologist

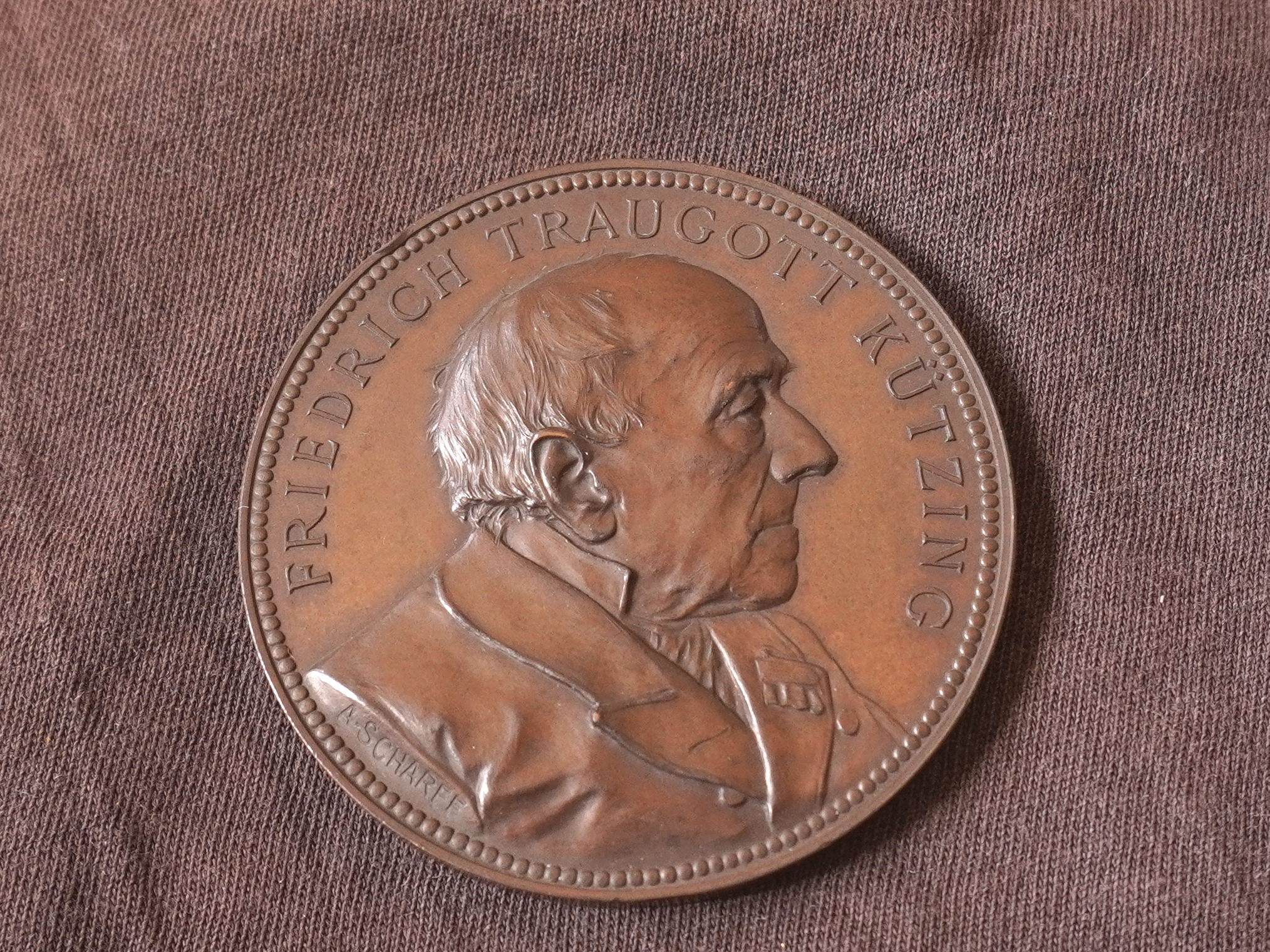
- 80th anniversary of Friedrich Traugott Kützing (1887) - medal by Anton Scharff - Collection Alfred Errera
- Born: 8 December 1807; Ritteburg
- Died: 9 September 1893 (aged 85)
- Citizenship: Germany
- Known for: Significant scientific contributions
- Scientific career
- Fields: Pharmacy, botany and phycology

Friedrich Traugott Kützing (8 December 1807 in Ritteburg – 9 September 1893) was a German pharmacist, botanist and phycologist.

Despite his limited background in regard to higher education, Kützing made significant scientific contributions. In 1833, he demonstrated differences between diatoms and desmids, thus separating the two groups into families of their own. Also, independent of Charles Cagniard-Latour (1777–1859) and Theodor Schwann (1810–1882), he was among the first to provide comprehensive answers in regard to yeast and the role it played in fermentation. In 1849, he published Species Algarum, a large work that provided descriptions for 6000 species of algae.

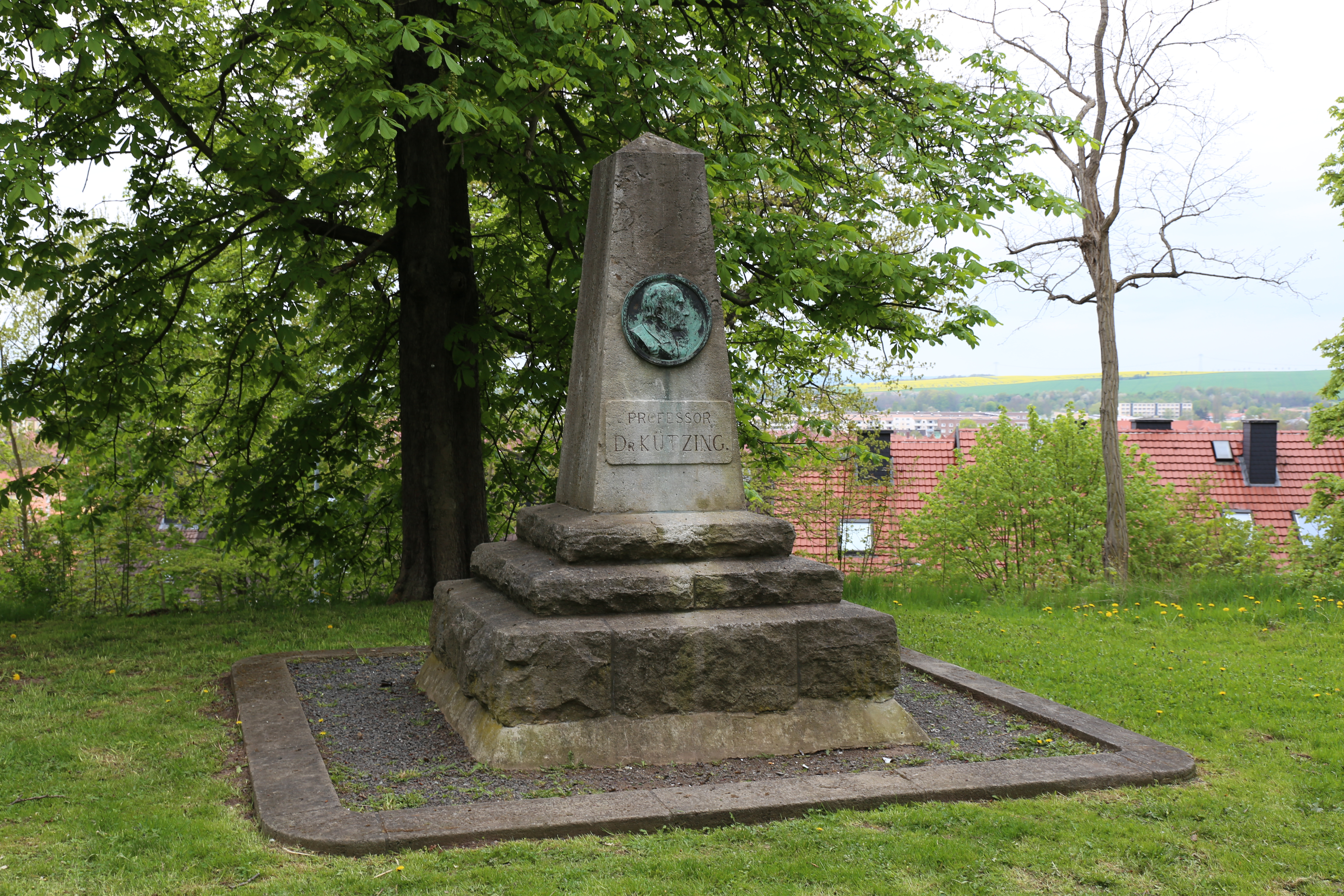
Monument to Kützing in Nordhausen

He is the taxonomic authority of the genera Syringodium (family Cymodoceaceae) and Phlebothamnion (family Ceramiaceae).

== Early life ==
As a young man, he worked in several pharmacies in Germany, also serving as assistant for a few semesters at the chemical-pharmaceutical institute of Franz Wilhelm Schweigger-Seidel (1795–1838) at Halle.

== Career ==
In 1835, he spent several months on a botanical excursion to Italy and Dalmatia, afterwards returning to Germany as a secondary school teacher of natural sciences in Nordhausen, a position his held until his retirement in 1883. In 1837 he was awarded with an honorary doctorate from the University of Giessen, and in 1843 received the title of professor.

== Selected bibliography ==
- Über den naturgeschichtlichen Unterricht in Realschulen. Schulprogramm der Realschule, Nordhausen 1837 - On natural history teaching in secondary schools.
- Microscopische Untersuchungen über die Hefe und Essigmutter, nebst mehreren andern dazu gehörigen vegetabilischen Gebilden, in: J. prakt. Chem. 11 (1837), S. 385–409. - Microscopical studies of yeast, etc.
- Phycologia generalis oder Anatomie, Physiologie und Systemkunde der Tange, Leipzig 1843.
- Die kieselschaligen Bacillarien oder Diatomeen, Nordhausen 1844. - The silica-shelled Bacillaria or Diatomea.
- Phycologica germanica, d. i. Deutschlands Algen in bündigen Beschreibungen. Nebst einer Anleitung zum Untersuchen und Bestimmen dieser Gewächse für Anfänger, Nordhausen 1845. - Algae from Germany in concise descriptions, etc.
- Species Algarum, Leipzig 1849, (Known algae of all parts of the world, 6000 described species).

Kützing edited and distributed the exsiccata Algarum aquae dulcis Germanicarum, collegit Fridericus Traugott Kutzing (1833-1836).
