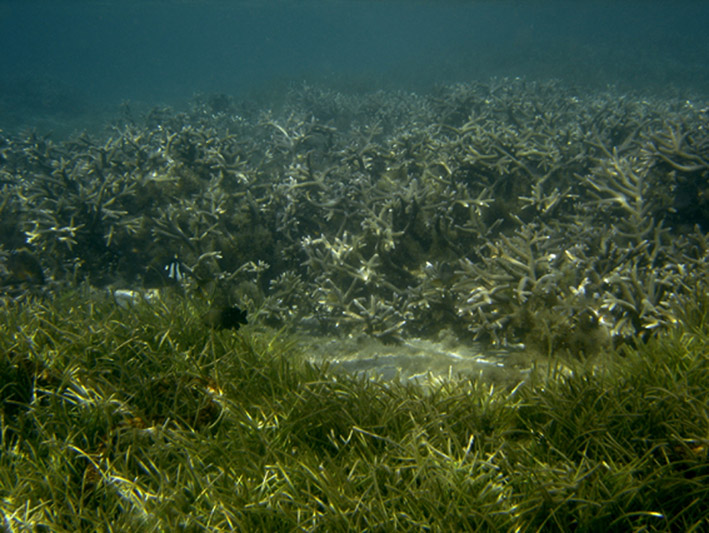
- Syringodium isoetifolium and Acropora sp.

Scientific classification
- Kingdom: Plantae
- Clade: Tracheophytes
- Clade: Angiosperms
- Clade: Monocots
- Order: Alismatales
- Family: Cymodoceaceae
- Genus: Syringodium; Kütz.

Type species
- Syringodium filiforme Kütz.

Synonyms
- Phycoschoenus (Asch.) Nakai

= Syringodium =

Genus of aquatic plants

Syringodium is a genus in the family Cymodoceaceae described as a genus in 1860. It is found along shorelines of tropical and subtropical marine environments (Indian and Pacific Oceans, Caribbean, Gulf of Mexico).

== Species ==
There are two recognised species

- Syringodium filiforme Kütz. - shores of Gulf of Mexico (TX LA MS FL, Tamaulipas, Veracruz, Tabasco, Yucatán Peninsula), and Caribbean (Bahamas, Bermuda, Cayman Islands, Greater + Lesser Antilles, Central America, Venezuela, Colombia)
- Syringodium isoetifolium - Indian + western Pacific shores including Red Sea, Persian Gulf, South China Sea: Africa (Egypt to Mozambique, Madagascar, Socotra, Seychelles, Mauritius, Réunion, Maldives, Andaman & Nicobar, Arabian Peninsula, Indian subcontinent, Southeast Asia, southern China, Papuasia, northern Australia, Papuasia, Micronesia
