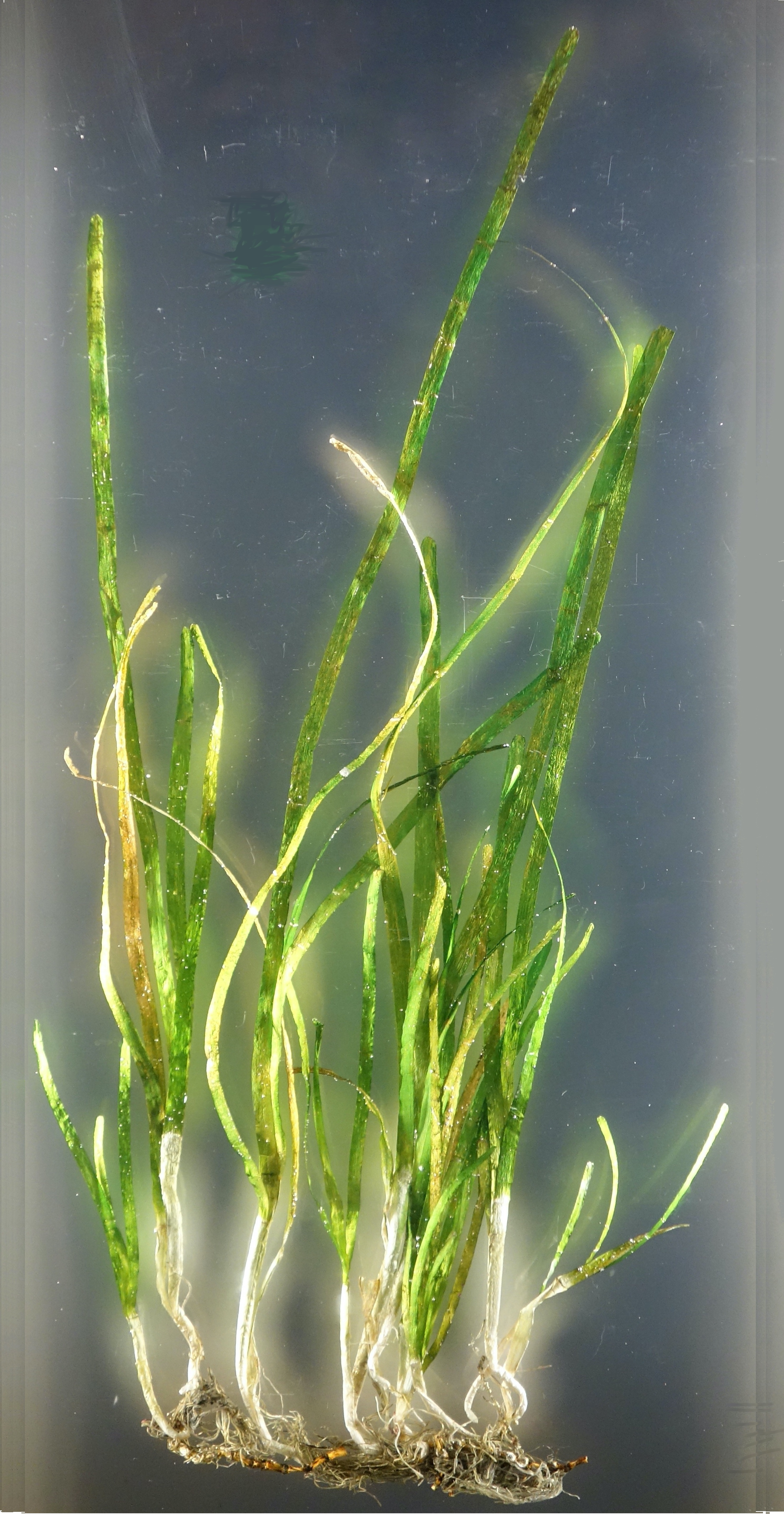
- Zostera marina – the most abundant seagrass species in the Northern Hemisphere

Scientific classification
- Kingdom: Plantae
- Clade: Tracheophytes
- Clade: Angiosperms
- Clade: Monocots
- Order: Alismatales

Families
- See Taxonomy

= Seagrass =

Seagrasses Temporal range: 70–0 Ma

Marine flowering plants

Seagrasses are the only embryophytes (commonly referred to as "land plants") which grow in marine environments. There are about 60 species of fully marine seagrasses which belong to four families (Posidoniaceae, Zosteraceae, Hydrocharitaceae and Cymodoceaceae), all in the order Alismatales (in the clade of monocotyledons). Seagrasses evolved from terrestrial plants which recolonised the ocean 70 to 100 million years ago.

The name seagrass stems from the many species with long and narrow leaves, which grow by rhizome extension and often spread across large "meadows" resembling grassland; many species superficially resemble terrestrial grasses of the family Poaceae.

Like all autotrophic plants, seagrasses photosynthesize, in the submerged photic zone, and most occur in shallow and sheltered coastal waters anchored in sand or mud bottoms. Most species undergo submarine pollination and complete their life cycle underwater. While it was previously believed this pollination was carried out without pollinators and purely by sea current drift, this has been shown to be false for at least one species, Thalassia testudinum, which carries out a mixed biotic-abiotic strategy. Crustaceans (such as crabs, Majidae zoae, Thalassinidea zoea) and syllid polychaete worm larvae have both been found with pollen grains, the plant producing nutritious mucigenous clumps of pollen to attract and stick to them instead of nectar as terrestrial flowers do.

Seagrasses form dense underwater seagrass meadows which are among the most productive ecosystems in the world. They function as important carbon sinks and provide habitats and food for a diversity of marine life comparable to that of coral reefs.

== Overview ==
Seagrasses are a paraphyletic group of marine angiosperms which evolved in parallel three to four times from land plants back to the sea. The following characteristics can be used to define a seagrass species:

- It lives in an estuarine or in the marine environment, and nowhere else.
- The pollination takes place underwater with specialized pollen.
- The seeds which are dispersed by both biotic and abiotic agents are produced underwater.
- The seagrass species have specialized leaves with a reduced cuticle, an epidermis which lacks stomata and is the main photosynthetic tissue.
- The rhizome or underground stem is important in anchoring.
- The roots can live in an anoxic environment and depend on oxygen transport from the leaves and rhizomes but are also important in the nutrient transfer processes.

Seagrasses profoundly influence the physical, chemical, and biological environments of coastal waters. Though seagrasses provide invaluable ecosystem services by acting as breeding and nursery ground for a variety of organisms and promote commercial fisheries, many aspects of their physiology are not well investigated. There are 26 species of seagrasses in North American coastal waters. Several studies have indicated that seagrass habitat is declining worldwide. Ten seagrass species are at elevated risk of extinction (14% of all seagrass species) with three species qualifying as endangered. Seagrass loss and degradation of seagrass biodiversity will have serious repercussions for marine biodiversity and the human population that depends upon the resources and ecosystem services that seagrasses provide.

Seagrasses form important coastal ecosystems. The worldwide endangering of these sea meadows, which provide food and habitat for many marine species, prompts the need for protection and understanding of these valuable resources.

== Evolution ==
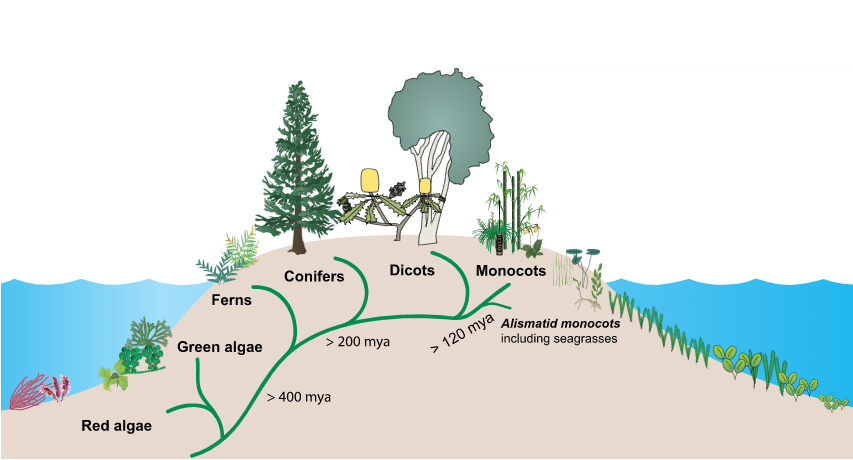
Evolution of seagrass, showing the progression onto land from marine origins, the diversification of land plants and the subsequent return to the sea by the seagrasses

Around 140 million years ago, seagrasses evolved from early monocots which succeeded in conquering the marine environment. Monocots are grass and grass-like flowering plants (angiosperms), the seeds of which typically contain only one embryonic leaf or cotyledon.

Terrestrial plants evolved perhaps as early as 450 million years ago from a group of green algae. Seagrasses then evolved from terrestrial plants which migrated back into the ocean. Between about 70 million and 100 million years ago, three independent seagrass lineages (Hydrocharitaceae, Cymodoceaceae complex, and Zosteraceae) evolved from a single lineage of the monocotyledonous flowering plants.

Other plants that colonised the sea, such as salt marsh plants, mangroves, and marine algae, have more diverse evolutionary lineages. In spite of their low species diversity, seagrasses have succeeded in colonising the continental shelves of all continents except Antarctica.

Recent sequencing of the genomes of Zostera marina and Zostera muelleri has given a better understanding of angiosperm adaptation to the sea. During the evolutionary step back to the ocean, different genes have been lost (e.g., stomatal genes) or have been reduced (e.g., genes involved in the synthesis of terpenoids) and others have been regained, such as in genes involved in sulfation.

Genome information has shown further that adaptation to the marine habitat was accomplished by radical changes in cell wall composition. However the cell walls of seagrasses are not well understood. In addition to the ancestral traits of land plants one would expect habitat-driven adaptation process to the new environment characterized by multiple abiotic (high amounts of salt) and biotic (different seagrass grazers and bacterial colonization) stressors. The cell walls of seagrasses seem intricate combinations of features known from both angiosperm land plants and marine macroalgae with new structural elements.

== Taxonomy ==
Today, seagrasses are a polyphyletic group of marine angiosperms with around 60 species in five families (Zosteraceae, Hydrocharitaceae, Posidoniaceae, Cymodoceaceae, and Ruppiaceae), which belong to the order Alismatales according to the Angiosperm Phylogeny Group IV System. The genus Ruppia, which occurs in brackish water, is not regarded as a "real" seagrass by all authors and has been shifted to the Cymodoceaceae by some authors. The APG IV system and The Plant List Webpage do not share this family assignment.

Family	Image	Genera	Description
Zosteraceae	The family Zosteraceae, also known as the seagrass family, includes two genera containing 14 marine species. It is found in temperate and subtropical coastal waters, with the highest diversity located around Korea and Japan. Species subtotal: 22 species		
Zosteraceae		Phyllospadix	6 species
Zosteraceae		Zostera	16 species
Hydrocharitaceae	The family Hydrocharitaceae, also known as tape-grasses, include Canadian waterweed and frogbit. The family includes both fresh and marine aquatics, although of the sixteen genera currently recognised, only three are marine. They are found throughout the world in a wide variety of habitats, but are primarily tropical. Species subtotal: 22 species		
Hydrocharitaceae		Enhalus	1 species
Hydrocharitaceae		Halophila	19 species
Hydrocharitaceae		Thalassia	2 species
Posidoniaceae	The family Posidoniaceae contains a single genus with two to nine marine species found in the seas of the Mediterranean and around the south coast of Australia. Species subtotal: 2 to 9		
Posidoniaceae		Posidonia	2 to 9 species
Cymodoceaceae	The family Cymodoceaceae, also known as manatee-grass, includes only marine species. Some taxonomists do not recognize this family. Species subtotal: 17 species		
Cymodoceaceae		Amphibolis	2 species
Cymodoceaceae		Cymodocea	4 species
Cymodoceaceae		Halodule	6 species
Cymodoceaceae		Syringodium	2 species
Cymodoceaceae		Thalassodendron	3 species
Total species: 61 species

== Cell walls ==
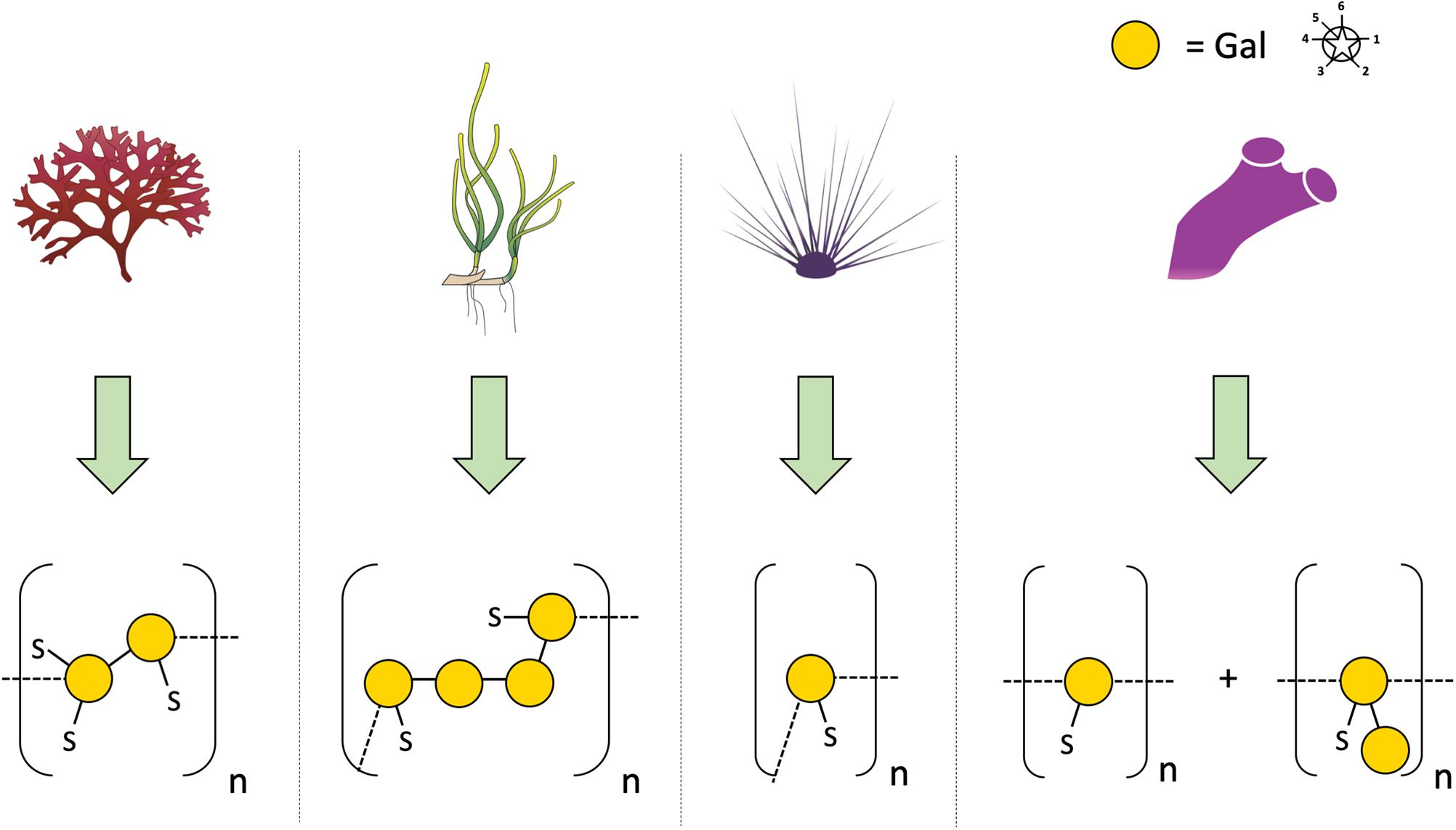
Structures of sulfated galactans from marine organisms. Sulfated polysaccharide structures from left to right: red algae: Botryocladia occidentalis, seagrass: Ruppia maritima, sea urchin: Echinometra lucunter, tunicate: Styela plicata.

Seagrass cell walls contain the same polysaccharides found in angiosperm land plants, such as cellulose. However, the cell walls of some seagrasses are characterised by sulfated polysaccharides, which is a common attribute of macroalgae from the groups of red, brown and also green algae. It was proposed in 2005 that the ability to synthesise sulfated polysaccharides was regained by marine angiosperms. Another unique feature of cell walls of seagrasses is the occurrence of unusual pectic polysaccharides called apiogalacturonans.

In addition to polysaccharides, glycoproteins of the hydroxyproline-rich glycoprotein family, are important components of cell walls of land plants. The highly glycosylated arabinogalactan proteins are of interest because of their involvement in both wall architecture and cellular regulatory processes. Arabinogalactan proteins are ubiquitous in seed land plants and have also been found in ferns, lycophytes and mosses. They are structurally characterised by large polysaccharide moieties composed of arabinogalactans (normally over 90% of the molecule) which are covalently linked via hydroxyproline to relatively small protein/peptide backbones (normally less than 10% of the molecule). Distinct glycan modifications have been identified in different species and tissues and it has been suggested these influence physical properties and function. In 2020, AGPs were isolated and structurally characterised for the first time from a seagrass. Although the common backbone structure of land plant arabinogalactan proteins is conserved, the glycan structures exhibit unique features suggesting a role of seagrass arabinogalactan proteins in osmoregulation.

Further components of secondary walls of plants are cross-linked phenolic polymers called lignin, which are responsible for mechanical strengthening of the wall. In seagrasses, this polymer has also been detected, but often in lower amounts compared to angiosperm land plants. Thus, the cell walls of seagrasses seem to contain combinations of features known from both angiosperm land plants and marine macroalgae together with new structural elements. Dried seagrass leaves might be useful for papermaking or as insulating materials, so knowledge of cell wall composition has some technological relevance.

== Sexual recruitment ==
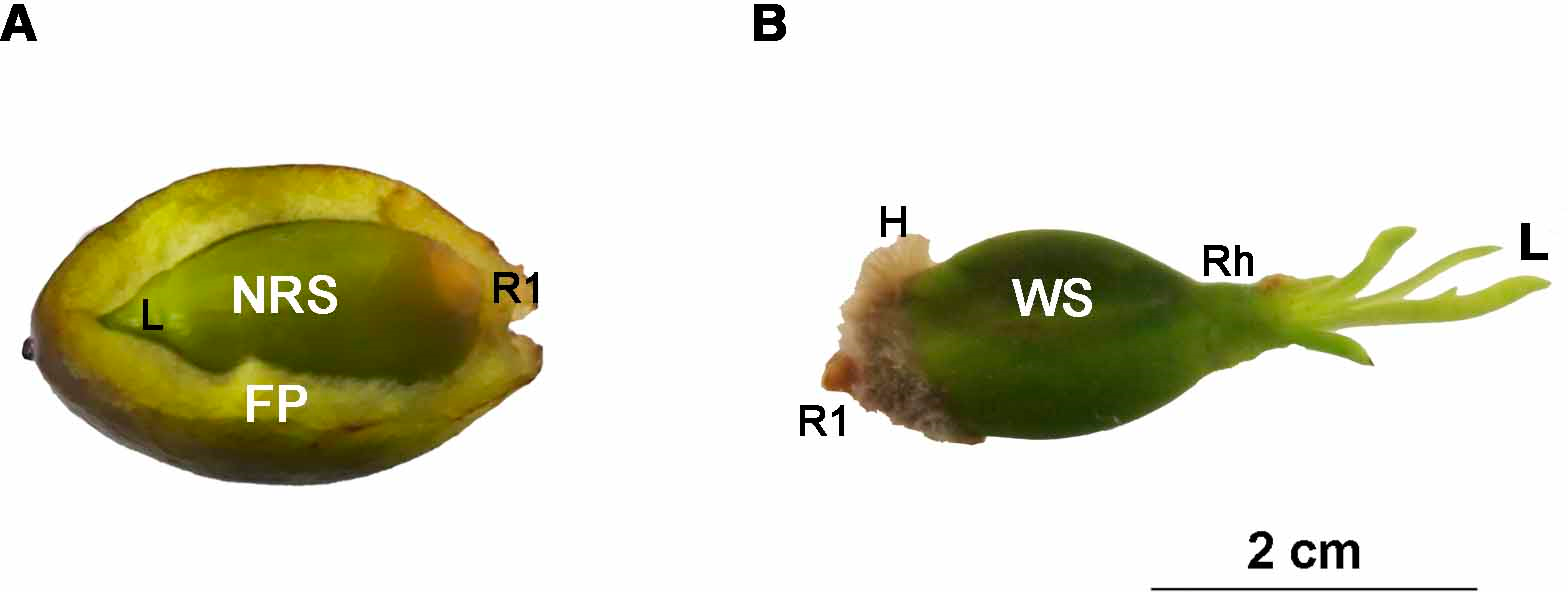
Seeds from Posidonia oceanica. (A) Newly released seeds inside a fruit, (B) one-week-old seeds. FP: fruit pericarp, NRS: newly released seeds, WS: 1-week-old seeds, H: adhesive hairs, S: seed, R1: primary root, Rh: rhizome, L: leaves.

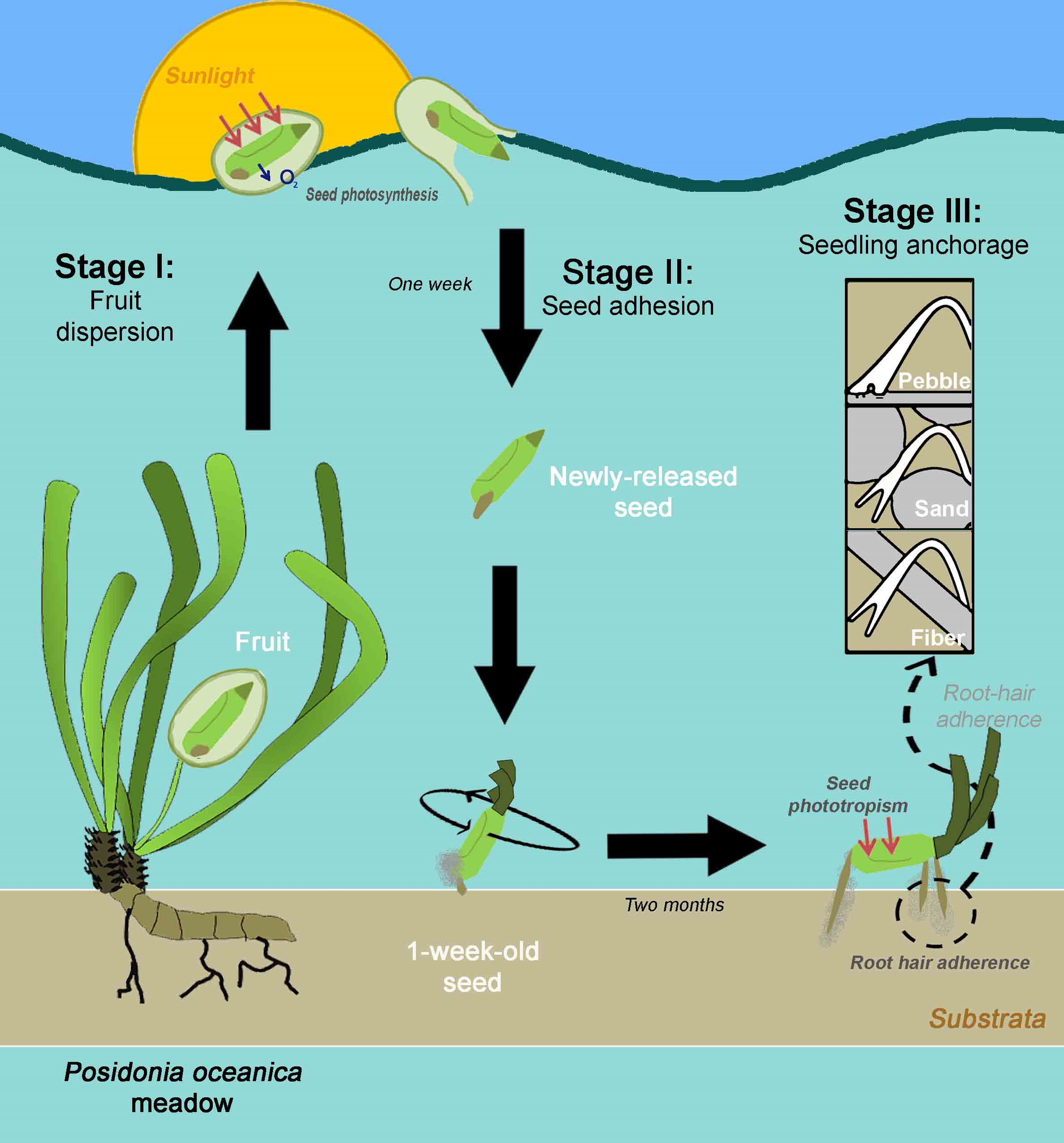
The sexual recruitment stages of Posidonia oceanica: dispersion, adhesion and settlement

Seagrass populations are currently threatened by a variety of anthropogenic stressors. The ability of seagrasses to cope with environmental perturbations depends, to some extent, on genetic variability, which is obtained through sexual recruitment. By forming new individuals, seagrasses increase their genetic diversity and thus their ability to colonise new areas and to adapt to environmental changes.

Seagrasses have contrasting colonisation strategies. Some seagrasses form seed banks of small seeds with hard pericarps that can remain in the dormancy stage for several months. These seagrasses are generally short-lived and can recover quickly from disturbances by not germinating far away from parent meadows (e.g., Halophila sp., Halodule sp., Cymodocea sp., Zostera sp. and Heterozostera sp.). In contrast, other seagrasses form dispersal propagules. This strategy is typical of long-lived seagrasses that can form buoyant fruits with inner large non-dormant seeds, such as the genera Posidonia sp., Enhalus sp. and Thalassia sp. Accordingly, the seeds of long-lived seagrasses have a large dispersal capacity compared to the seeds of the short-lived type, which permits the evolution of species beyond unfavourable light conditions by the seedling development of parent meadows.

The seagrass Posidonia oceanica (L.) Delile is one of the oldest and largest species on Earth. An individual can form meadows measuring nearly 15 km wide and can be hundreds to thousands of years old. P. oceanica meadows play important roles in the maintenance of the geomorphology of Mediterranean coasts, which, among others, makes this seagrass a priority habitat of conservation. Currently, the flowering and recruitment of P. oceanica seems to be more frequent than that expected in the past. Further, this seagrass has singular adaptations to increase its survival during recruitment. The large amounts of nutrient reserves contained in the seeds of this seagrass support shoot and root growth, even up to the first year of seedling development. In the first months of germination, when leaf development is scarce, P. oceanica seeds perform photosynthetic activity, which increases their photosynthetic rates and thus maximises seedling establishment success. Seedlings also show high morphological plasticity during their root system development by forming adhesive root hairs to help anchor themselves to rocky sediments. However, many factors about P. oceanica sexual recruitment remain unknown, such as when photosynthesis in seeds is active or how seeds can remain anchored to and persist on substrate until their root systems have completely developed.

== Intertidal and subtidal ==
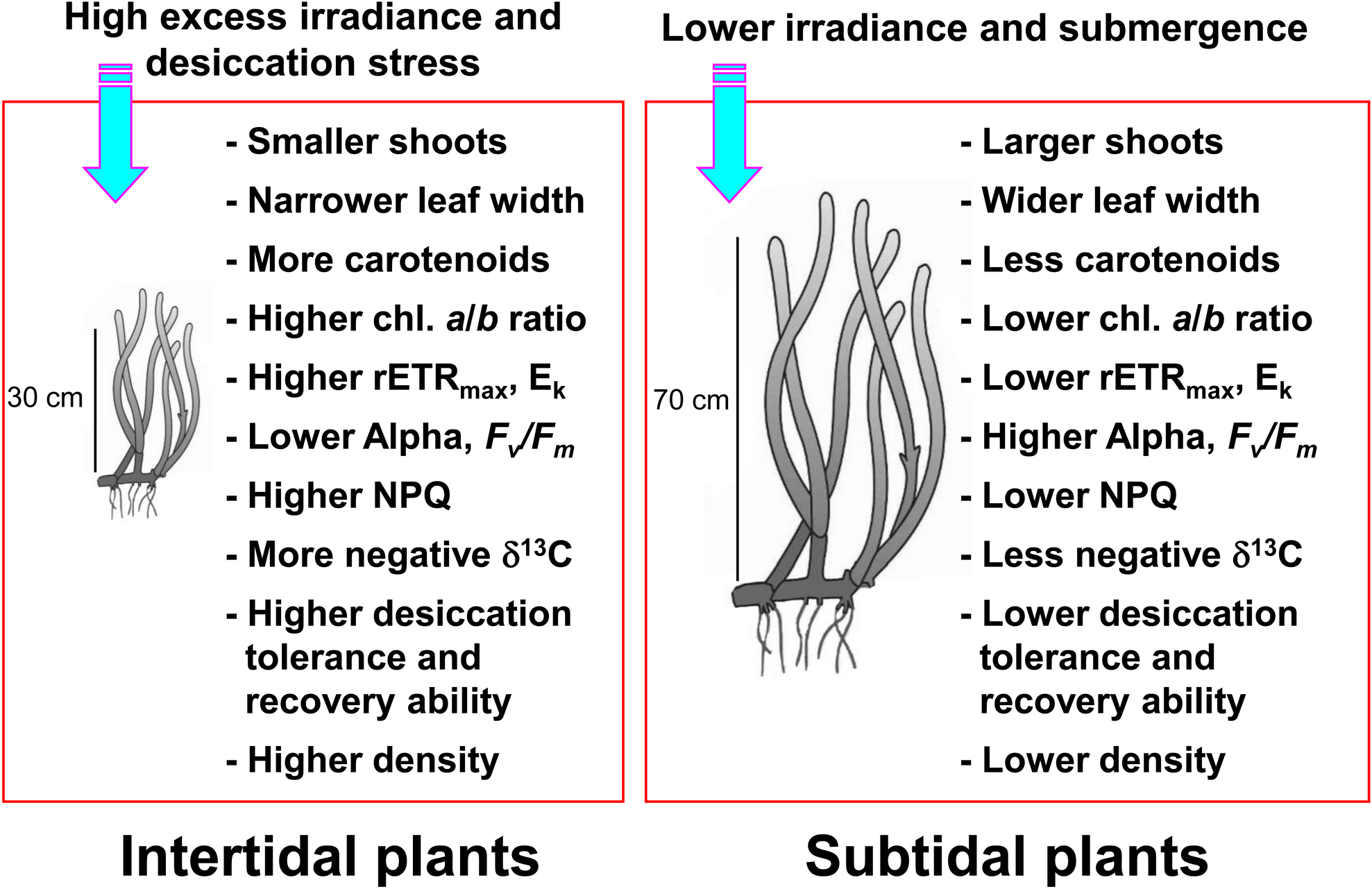
Morphological and photoacclimatory responses of intertidal and subtidal Zostera marina eelgrass

Seagrasses occurring in the intertidal and subtidal zones are exposed to highly variable environmental conditions due to tidal changes. Subtidal seagrasses are more frequently exposed to lower light conditions, driven by plethora of natural and human-caused influences that reduce light penetration by increasing the density of suspended opaque materials. Subtidal light conditions can be estimated, with high accuracy, using artificial intelligence, enabling more rapid mitigation than was available using in situ techniques. Seagrasses in the intertidal zone are regularly exposed to air and consequently experience extreme high and low temperatures, high photoinhibitory irradiance, and desiccation stress relative to subtidal seagrass. Such extreme temperatures can lead to significant seagrass dieback when seagrasses are exposed to air during low tide. Desiccation stress during low tide has been considered the primary factor limiting seagrass distribution at the upper intertidal zone. Seagrasses residing the intertidal zone are usually smaller than those in the subtidal zone to minimize the effects of emergence stress. Intertidal seagrasses also show light-dependent responses, such as decreased photosynthetic efficiency and increased photoprotection during periods of high irradiance and air exposure.

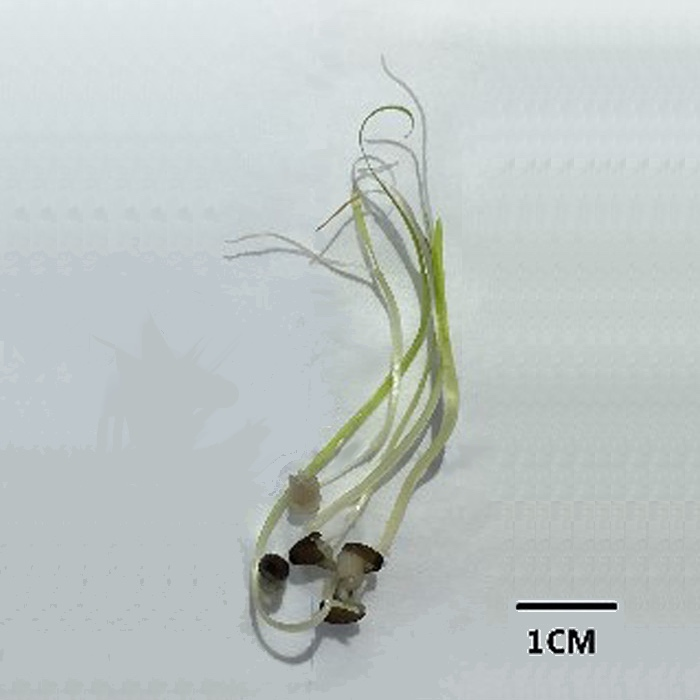
Zostera marina seedling

In contrast, seagrasses in the subtidal zone adapt to reduced light conditions caused by light attenuation and scattering due to the overlaying water column and suspended particles. Seagrasses in the deep subtidal zone generally have longer leaves and wider leaf blades than those in the shallow subtidal or intertidal zone, which allows more photosynthesis, in turn resulting in greater growth. Seagrasses also respond to reduced light conditions by increasing chlorophyll content and decreasing the chlorophyll a/b ratio to enhance light absorption efficiency by using the abundant wavelengths efficiently. As seagrasses in the intertidal and subtidal zones are under highly different light conditions, they exhibit distinctly different photoacclimatory responses to maximize photosynthetic activity and photoprotection from excess irradiance.

Seagrasses assimilate large amounts of inorganic carbon to achieve high level production. Marine macrophytes, including seagrass, use both CO_{2} and HCO^{−}_{3} (bicarbonate) for photosynthetic carbon reduction. Despite air exposure during low tide, seagrasses in the intertidal zone can continue to photosynthesize utilizing CO_{2} in the air. Thus, the composition of inorganic carbon sources for seagrass photosynthesis probably varies between intertidal and subtidal plants. Because stable carbon isotope ratios of plant tissues change based on the inorganic carbon sources for photosynthesis, seagrasses in the intertidal and subtidal zones may have different stable carbon isotope ratio ranges.

== Seagrass meadows ==
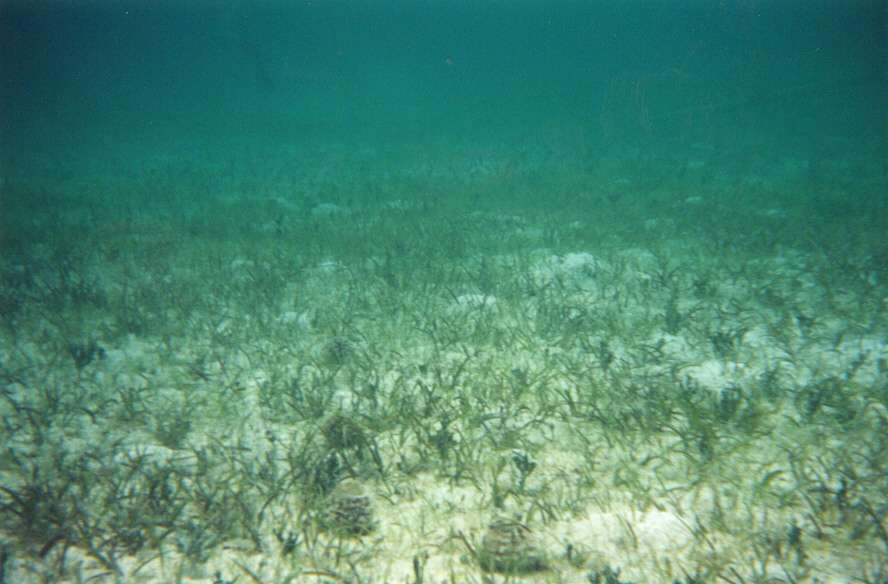
Seagrass bed with several echinoids

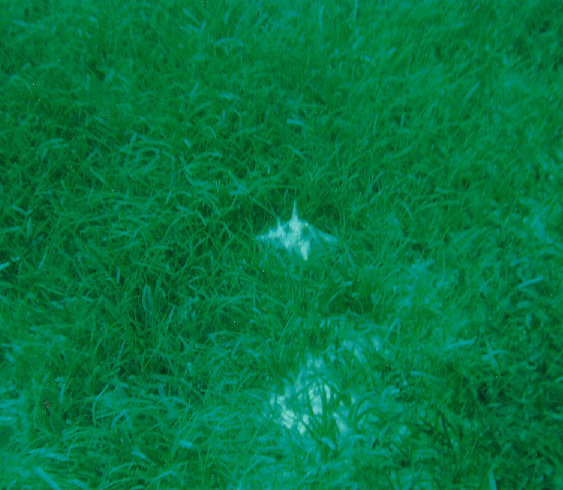
Seagrass bed with dense turtle grass (Thalassia testudinum) and an immature queen conch (Eustrombus gigas)

Seagrass beds/meadows can be either monospecific (made up of a single species) or in mixed beds. In temperate areas, usually one or a few species dominate (like the eelgrass Zostera marina in the North Atlantic), whereas tropical beds usually are more diverse, with up to thirteen species recorded in the Philippines.

Seagrass beds are diverse and productive ecosystems, and can harbour hundreds of associated species from all phyla, for example juvenile and adult fish, epiphytic and free-living macroalgae and microalgae, molluscs, bristle worms, and nematodes. Few species were originally considered to feed directly on seagrass leaves (partly because of their low nutritional content), but scientific reviews and improved working methods have shown that seagrass herbivory is an important link in the food chain, feeding hundreds of species, including green turtles, dugongs, manatees, fish, geese, swans, sea urchins and crabs. Some fish species that visit/feed on seagrasses raise their young in adjacent mangroves or coral reefs.

Seagrasses trap sediment and slow down water movement, causing suspended sediment to settle out. Trapping sediment benefits coral by reducing sediment loads, improving photosynthesis for both coral and seagrass.

Although often overlooked, seagrasses provide a number of ecosystem services. Seagrasses are considered ecosystem engineers. This means that the plants alter the ecosystem around them. This adjusting occurs in both physical and chemical forms. Many seagrass species produce an extensive underground network of roots and rhizome which stabilizes sediment and reduces coastal erosion. This system also assists in oxygenating the sediment, providing a hospitable environment for sediment-dwelling organisms. Seagrasses also enhance water quality by stabilizing heavy metals, pollutants, and excess nutrients. The long blades of seagrasses slow the movement of water which reduces wave energy and offers further protection against coastal erosion and storm surge. Furthermore, because seagrasses are underwater plants, they produce significant amounts of oxygen which oxygenate the water column. These meadows account for more than 10% of the ocean's total carbon storage. Per hectare, it holds twice as much carbon dioxide as rain forests and can sequester about 27.4 million tons of CO_{2} annually.

Seagrass meadows provide food for many marine herbivores. Sea turtles, manatees, parrotfish, surgeonfish, sea urchins and pinfish feed on seagrasses. Many other smaller animals feed on the epiphytes and invertebrates that live on and among seagrass blades. Seagrass meadows also provide physical habitat in areas that would otherwise be bare of any vegetation. Due to this three dimensional structure in the water column, many species occupy seagrass habitats for shelter and foraging. It is estimated that 17 species of coral reef fish spend their entire juvenile life stage solely on seagrass flats. These habitats also act as a nursery grounds for commercially and recreationally valued fishery species, including the gag grouper (Mycteroperca microlepis), red drum, common snook, and many others. Some fish species utilize seagrass meadows and various stages of the life cycle. In a recent publication, Dr. Ross Boucek and colleagues discovered that two highly sought after flats fish, the common snook and spotted sea trout provide essential foraging habitat during reproduction. Sexual reproduction is extremely energetically expensive to be completed with stored energy; therefore, they require seagrass meadows in close proximity to complete reproduction. Furthermore, many commercially important invertebrates also reside in seagrass habitats including bay scallops (Argopecten irradians), horseshoe crabs, and shrimp. Charismatic fauna can also be seen visiting the seagrass habitats. These species include West Indian manatee, green sea turtles, and various species of sharks. The high diversity of marine organisms that can be found on seagrass habitats promotes them as a tourist attraction and a significant source of income for many coastal economies along the Gulf of Mexico and in the Caribbean.

In 2022, scientists reported the discovery of the world's largest known seagrass ecosystem, near the Bahamas. The discovery was made with the help of tiger sharks who between 2016 and 2022 were tagged with cameras so that scientists could see the ocean floor from a different perspective.

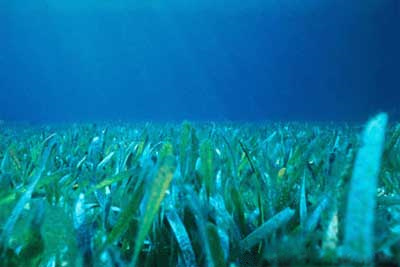
Thalassia testudinum seagrass bed

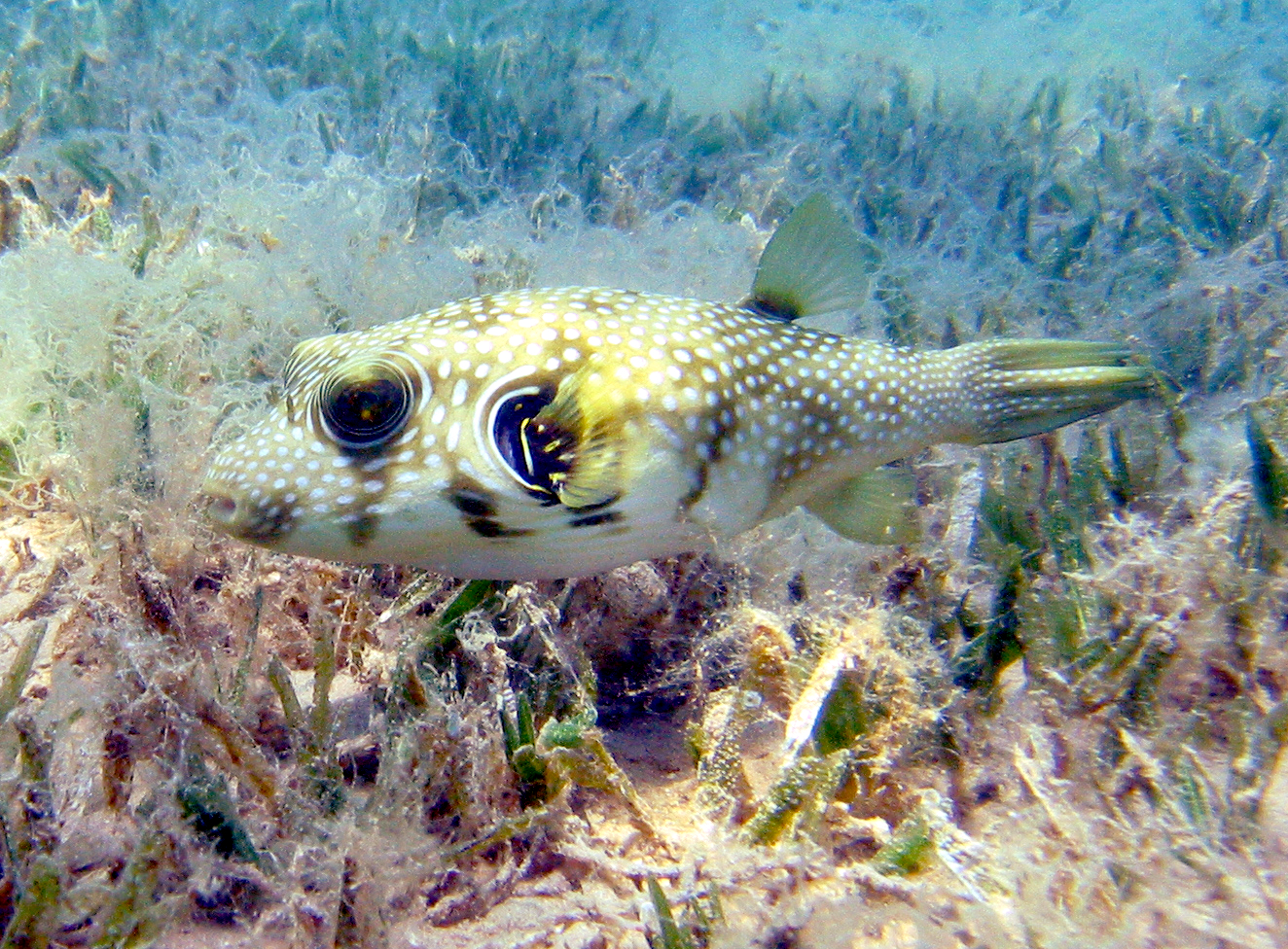
White-spotted puffers, often found in seagrass areas

Underwater footage of seagrass meadow, bull huss and conger eel

== Seagrass microbiome ==
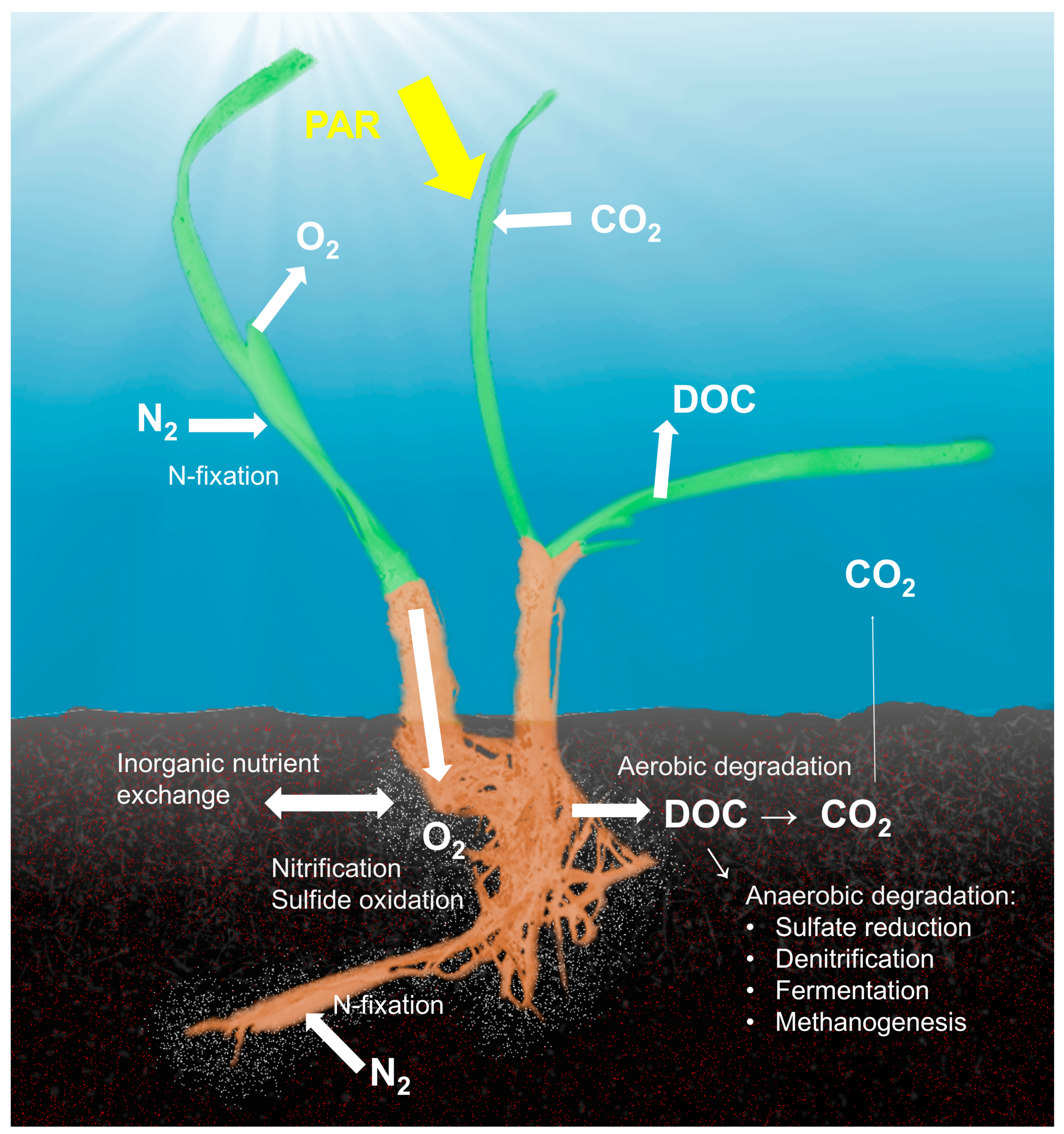
The most important interconnected processes within the seagrass holobiont are related to processes in the carbon, nitrogen and sulfur cycles. Photosynthetically active radiation (PAR) determines the photosynthetic activity of the seagrass plant that determines how much carbon dioxide is fixed, how much dissolved organic carbon (DOC) is exuded from the leaves and root system, and how much oxygen is transported into the rhizosphere. Oxygen transportation into the rhizosphere alters the redox conditions in the rhizosphere, differentiating it from the surrounding sediments that are usually anoxic and sulfidic.

=== Seagrass holobiont ===
The concept of the holobiont, which emphasizes the importance and interactions of a microbial host with associated microorganisms and viruses and describes their functioning as a single biological unit, has been investigated and discussed for many model systems, although there is substantial criticism of a concept that defines diverse host-microbe symbioses as a single biological unit. The holobiont and hologenome concepts have evolved since the original definition, and there is no doubt that symbiotic microorganisms are pivotal for the biology and ecology of the host by providing vitamins, energy and inorganic or organic nutrients, participating in defence mechanisms, or by driving the evolution of the host.

Although most work on host-microbe interactions has been focused on animal systems such as corals, sponges, or humans, there is a substantial body of literature on plant holobionts. Plant-associated microbial communities impact both key components of the fitness of plants, growth and survival, and are shaped by nutrient availability and plant defence mechanisms. Several habitats have been described to harbour plant-associated microbes, including the rhizoplane (surface of root tissue), the rhizosphere (periphery of the roots), the endosphere (inside plant tissue), and the phyllosphere (total above-ground surface area). These distinctions are due to the differences in how the biotic and abiotic factors interact with the plant as the community structure in anoxic sediments will differ from that in a dynamic water column.

=== Microbial associations ===
Most seagrass microbiome studies use Zostera marina as the target species due to its wide distribution and substantial ecosystem services. There is a general vertical shift in the microbial population in seagrasses with Alpha and Gamma proteobacteria dominating the upper leaf microenvironment while Delta and Gamma proteobacteria are the primary phyla in the rhizosphere. While sharing phyla there are significant differences in above and belowground microbial communities on seagrass hosts. The functional roles of microbes in the regions are distinct. The consumption of waste products, pathogen defence, and epiphytic control are primary roles on mature blades. Growth promoting characteristics from specialized taxa have endophytic representation in reproductive tissues and seeds. Nitrogen fixation, sulfur oxidation and compound management are the functions most associated with rhizosphere taxa in which fungal and archaeal OTUs (operational taxonomic units) also have representation.

The microbial community in the Posidonia oceanica rhizosphere shows similar complexity as terrestrial habitats that contain thousands of taxa per gram of soil. In contrast, the chemistry in the rhizosphere of P. oceanica was dominated by the presence of sugars like sucrose and phenolics.

=== Interest in core microbiome ===
There is current interest in the concept of a core seagrass microbiome. The concept faces challenges as there is no consensus on definition or quantification methods as the scale, objectives and resolution of a study vary with research and analysis. Overarchingly it is defined as a consistent set of microbial taxa associated with a given host. Seagrass literature has been interested in defining core microbiomes across populations, species, genera, and geographical regions. The findings are in contention with support for and against the theory of a core microbiome. One of the primary challenges is the vast range of taxonomic resolution in seagrass studies that complicates meaningful comparisons.

=== Microbiome research ===
The history of microbiome research in seagrasses has seen an expansion with the improvement of methods and technology. Research interests first sought to validate the existence of a seagrass holobiont by characterizing consistently present microbes on the plant that are distinct from the surrounding water column and sediment. As this characterization began, high throughput sequencing, a data intensive and cost effective method to analyse DNA and RNA, allowed for an increase of microbiome work in aquatic environments.

The original interests shifted and radiated with studies characterizing seagrass communities by microenvironment (rhizosphere, endosphere, phyllosphere), life stage, and geographic region. Conservation efforts have begun considering microbial communities within rearing methods as they are linked to plant fitness and reproductive success. Microbe-microbe interactions, seagrass microbe colonization and community shifts, disease and pathogenic interactions, and how environmental variables shift communities over time are examples of current fields within modern seagrass work.

Future directions aim to understand the functional mechanisms of seagrass associated microbes but are faced with challenges. Seagrass microbiomes and their interactions can be polymicrobial; which makes isolating and assigning functions difficult. Metagenomics still has lapses as low abundance organisms can be missed by the sequencing process and mechanistic pathways are not always determined with high confidence. Identifying causative agents in seagrass diseases is a growing objective as populations are declining globally.

== Threats and conservation ==
Despite only covering 0.1 - 0.2% of the ocean's surface, seagrasses form critically important ecosystems. Much like many other regions of the ocean, seagrasses have been faced with an accelerating global decline. Since the late 19th century, over 20% of the global seagrass area has been lost, with seagrass bed loss occurring at a rate of 1.5% each year. Of the 72 global seagrass species, approximately one quarter (15 species) could be considered at a Threatened or Near Threatened status on the IUCN's Red List of Threatened Species. Threats include a combination of natural factors, such as storms and disease, and anthropogenic in origin, including habitat destruction, pollution, and climate change.

By far the most common threat to seagrass is human activity. Up to 67 species (93%) of seagrasses are affected by human activity along coastal regions. Activities such as coastal land development, motorboating, and fishing practices like trawling either physically destroy seagrass beds or increase turbidity in the water, causing seagrass die-off. Since seagrasses have some of the highest light requirements of angiosperm plant species, they are highly affected by environmental conditions that change water clarity and block light.

Seagrasses are also negatively affected by changing global climatic conditions. Increased weather events, sea level rise, and higher temperatures as a result of global warming all have the potential to induce widespread seagrass loss. An additional threat to seagrass beds is the introduction of non-native species. For seagrass beds worldwide, at least 28 non-native species have become established. Of these invasive species, the majority (64%) have been documented to infer negative effects on the ecosystem.

Another major cause of seagrass disappearance is coastal eutrophication. Rapidly developing human population density along coastlines has led to high nutrient loads in coastal waters from sewage and other impacts of development. Increased nutrient loads create an accelerating cascade of direct and indirect effects that lead to seagrass decline. While some exposure to high concentrations of nutrients, especially nitrogen and phosphorus, can result in increased seagrass productivity, high nutrient levels can also stimulate the rapid overgrowth of macroalgae and epiphytes in shallow water, and phytoplankton in deeper water. In response to high nutrient levels, macroalgae form dense canopies on the surface of the water, limiting the light able to reach the benthic seagrasses. Algal blooms caused by eutrophication also lead to hypoxic conditions, which seagrasses are also highly susceptible to. Since coastal sediment is generally anoxic, seagrass must supply oxygen to their below-ground roots either through photosynthesis or by the diffusion of oxygen in the water column. When the water surrounding seagrass becomes hypoxic, so too do seagrass tissues. Hypoxic conditions negatively affect seagrass growth and survival with seagrasses exposed to hypoxic conditions shown to have reduced rates of photosynthesis, increased respiration, and smaller growth. Hypoxic conditions can eventually lead to seagrass die-off which creates a positive feedback cycle, where the decomposition of organic matter further decreases the amount of oxygen present in the water column.

Possible seagrass population trajectories have been studied in the Mediterranean sea. These studies suggest that the presence of seagrass depends on physical factors such as temperature, salinity, depth and turbidity, along with natural phenomena like climate change and anthropogenic pressure. While there are exceptions, regression was a general trend in many areas of the Mediterranean Sea. There is an estimated 27.7% reduction along the southern coast of Latium, 18%-38% reduction in the Northern Mediterranean basin, 19%-30% reduction on Ligurian coasts since the 1960s and 23% reduction in France in the past 50 years. In Spain the main reason for regression was due to human activity such as illegal trawling and aquaculture farming. It was found that areas with medium to high human impact suffered more severe reduction. Overall, it was suggested that 29% of known areal seagrass populations have disappeared since 1879. The reduction in these areas suggests that should warming in the Mediterranean basin continue, it may lead to a functional extinction of Posidonia oceanica in the Mediterranean by 2050. Scientists suggested that the trends they identified appear to be part of a large-scale trend worldwide.

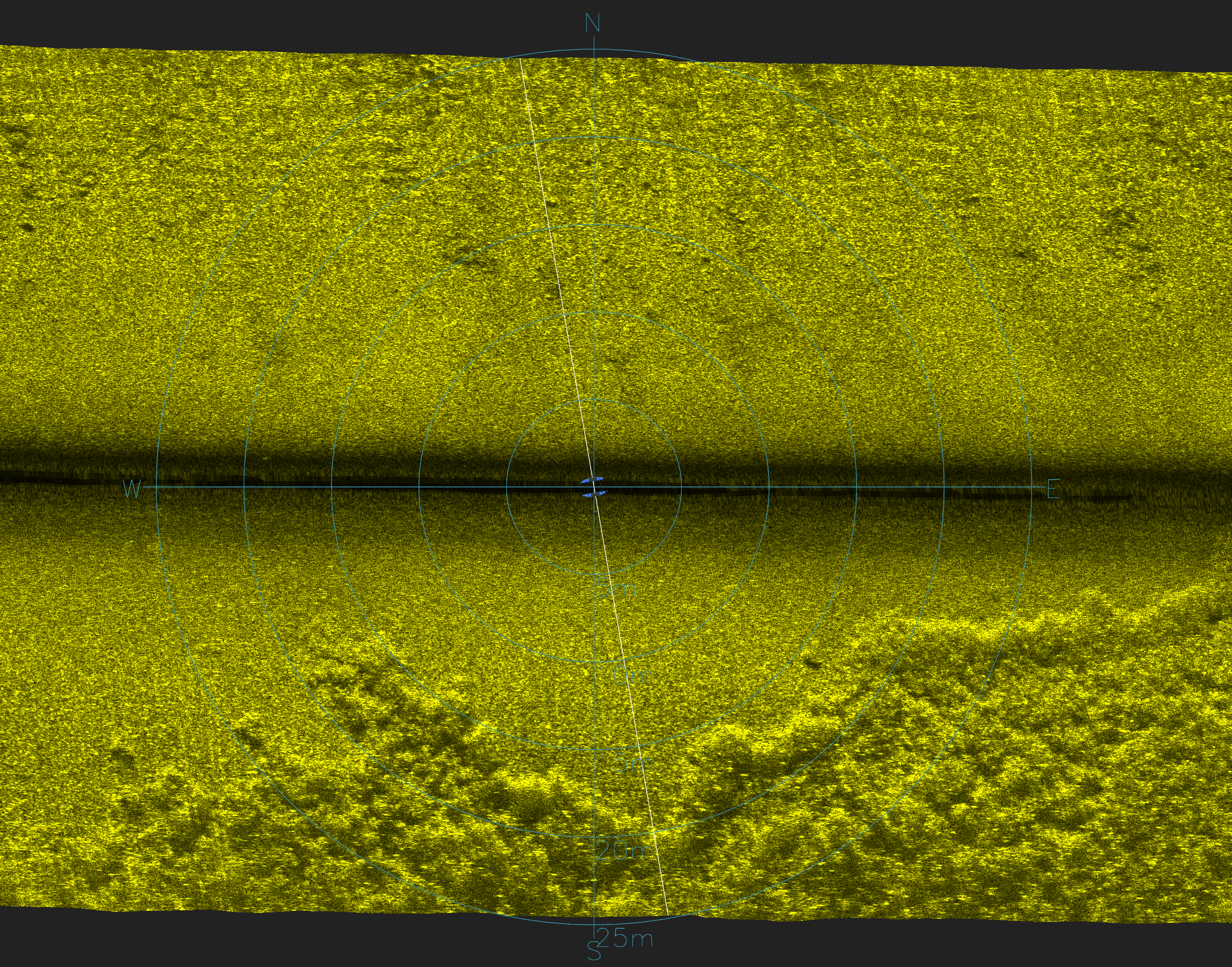
seagrass in Sequim Bay, WA, visible via side-scan sonar in SonarView application, surveying with BlueBoat

Conservation efforts are imperative to the survival of seagrass species. While there are many challenges to overcome with respect to seagrass conservation there are some major ones that can be addressed. Societal awareness of what seagrasses are and their importance to human well-being is incredibly important. As the majority of people become more urbanized they are increasingly more disconnected from the natural world. This allows for misconceptions and a lack of understanding of seagrass ecology and its importance. Additionally, it is a challenge to obtain and maintain information on the status and condition of seagrass populations. With many populations across the globe, it is difficult to map the current populations. Another challenge faced in seagrass conservation is the ability to identify threatening activities on a local scale. Also, in an ever growing human population, there is a need to balance the needs of the people while also balancing the needs of the planet. Lastly, it is challenging to generate scientific research to support conservation of seagrass. Limited efforts and resources are dedicated to the study of seagrasses. This is seen in areas such as India and China where there is little to no plan in place to conserve seagrass populations. However, the conservation and restoration of seagrass may contribute to 16 of the 17 UN Sustainable Development Goals.

In a study of seagrass conservation in China, several suggestions were made by scientists on how to better conserve seagrass. They suggested that seagrass beds should be included in the Chinese conservation agenda as done in other countries. They called for the Chinese government to forbid land reclamation in areas near or in seagrass beds, to reduce the number and size of culture ponds, to control raft aquaculture and improve sediment quality, to establish seagrass reserves, to increase awareness of seagrass beds to fishermen and policy makers and to carry out seagrass restoration. Similar suggestions were made in India where scientists suggested that public engagement was important. Also, scientists, the public, and government officials should work in tandem to integrate traditional ecological knowledge and socio-cultural practices to evolve conservation policies.

World Seagrass Day is an annual event held on March 1 to raise awareness about seagrass and its important functions in the marine ecosystem.

== See also ==
- Alismatales
- Blue carbon
- Salt marsh
- Mangrove
- Sea rewilding
- Nursery habitat
- Ocean Data Viewer: contains the global distribution of seagrasses dataset

== Further references ==
- den Hartog, C. 1970. The Sea-grasses of the World. Verhandl. der Koninklijke Nederlandse Akademie van Wetenschappen, Afd. Natuurkunde, No. 59(1).
- Duarte, Carlos M. and Carina L. Chiscano "Seagrass biomass and production: a reassessment" Aquatic Botany Volume 65, Issues 1–4, November 1999, Pages 159–174.
- Green, E.P. & Short, F.T.(eds). 2003. World Atlas of Seagrasses. University of California Press, Berkeley, CA. 298 pp.
- Hemminga, M.A. & Duarte, C. 2000. Seagrass Ecology. Cambridge University Press, Cambridge. 298 pp.
- Hogarth, Peter The Biology of Mangroves and Seagrasses (Oxford University Press, 2007)
- Larkum, Anthony W.D., Robert J. Orth, and Carlos M. Duarte (Editors) Seagrasses: Biology, Ecology and Conservation (Springer, 2006)
- Orth, Robert J. et al. "A Global Crisis for Seagrass Ecosystems" BioScience December 2006 / Vol. 56 No. 12, Pages 987–996.
- Short, F.T. & Coles, R.G.(eds). 2001. Global Seagrass Research Methods. Elsevier Science, Amsterdam. 473 pp.
- A.W.D. Larkum, R.J. Orth, and C.M. Duarte (eds). Seagrass Biology: A Treatise. CRC Press, Boca Raton, FL, in press.
- A. Schwartz; M. Morrison; I. Hawes; J. Halliday. 2006. Physical and biological characteristics of a rare marine habitat: sub-tidal seagrass beds of offshore islands. Science for Conservation 269. 39 pp.
- Waycott, M, McMahon, K, & Lavery, P 2014, A guide to southern temperate seagrasses, CSIRO Publishing, Melbourne
