= Heidi Nepf =

American engineer

Heidi Margaret Nepf
- Education: Stanford University
- Scientific career
- Thesis: The production and mixing effects of Langmuir circulations (1992)

Heidi Nepf is an American engineer known for her research on fluid flows around aquatic vegetation.

== Education and career ==
Nepf has a B.S. from Bucknell University (1987) and an M.S. from Stanford University (1988). Nepf earned a Ph.D. in Civil Engineering from Stanford University in 1992 with a dissertation titled "The production and mixing effects of Langmuir circulations". Following her Ph.D., Nepf was a postdoctoral scholar at Woods Hole Oceanographic Institution, and then joined the faculty of Massachusetts Institute of Technology in 1993. As of 2021, she is the Donald and Martha Harleman Professor at Massachusetts Institute of Technology.

In 2018, Nepf was named a fellow of the American Geophysical Union and the citation reads:

For seminal contributions to the theory, modeling, and environmental applications of flow and transport through aquatic vegetation.

== Research ==
Nepf is known for her research on the flow of water around aquatic vegetation. In 1999, she developed a model describing how aquatic plants convert kinetic energy into turbulent energy. She has furthered this research by examining the flow of water around plants and characterizing sediment flow through coastal marshes and mangroves. Using artificial seagrass beds, Nepf and her graduate student Judy Yang determined that turbulence is a good predictor of sediment flow through a seagrass bed. Nepf and another graduate student, Jiarui Lei, used similar artificial seagrass reefs to quantify the dissipation of energy by seagrass and their results indicate seagrass can protect coastlines that are vulnerable to erosion. Nepf's research on water flow around logjams informs river restoration projects by theoretically describing the flow of water around wood placed into a stream. Nepf has also worked on fluid flows in urban regions, specifically on how capturing storm water can be used to control urban flood damage.

=== Selected publications ===
- Nepf, H. M. (1999). "Drag, turbulence, and diffusion in flow through emergent vegetation". Water Resources Research. 35 (2): 479–489. Bibcode:1999WRR....35..479N. doi:10.1029/1998WR900069. hdl:1721.1/68641. ISSN 1944-7973. S2CID 15673312.
- Nepf, Heidi M. (2011-12-23). "Flow and Transport in Regions with Aquatic Vegetation". Annual Review of Fluid Mechanics. 44 (1): 123–142. doi:10.1146/annurev-fluid-120710-101048. hdl:1721.1/79046. ISSN 0066-4189.

== Awards ==
- MacVicar Fellow for "excellence in teaching and innovation in education", Massachusetts Institute of Technology (2001)
- Distinguished alumni, Bucknell University (2013)
- Fellow, American Geophysical Union (2018)
- Hunter Rouse Hydraulic Engineering Award, American Society of Civil Engineers (2019)
