= Facilitation cascade =

Beneficial ecological chain reaction

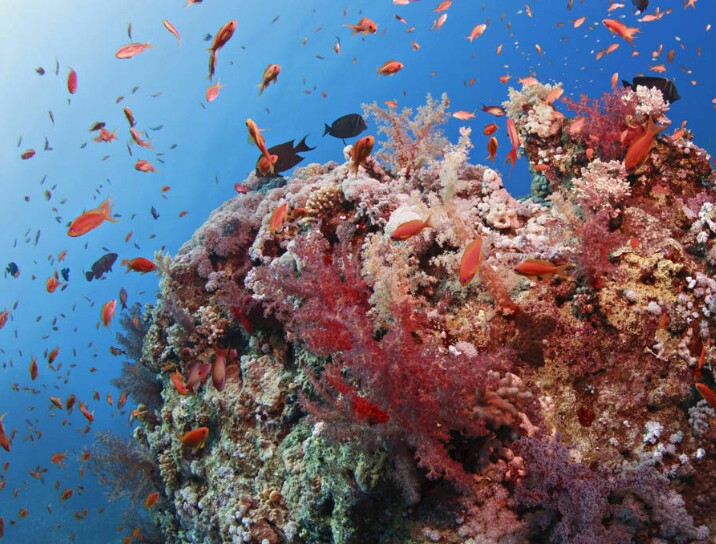
Coral reefs buffer seagrass and mangroves from offshore wave energy, allowing them to establish in relative calm areas, whereas mangroves and seagrass trap terrestrial sediment and nutrients that would otherwise lead to smothering of reefs.

A facilitation cascade is a sequence of ecological interactions that occur when a species benefits a second species that in turn has a positive effect on a third species. These facilitative interactions can take the form of amelioration of environmental stress and/or provision of refuge from predation. Autogenic ecosystem engineering species, structural species, habitat-forming species, and foundation species are associated with the most commonly recognized examples of facilitation cascades, sometimes referred to as a habitat cascades. Facilitation generally is a much broader concept that includes all forms of positive interactions including pollination, seed dispersal, and co-evolved commensalism and mutualistic relationships, such as between cnidarian hosts and Symbiodinium in corals, and between algae and fungi in lichens. As such, facilitation cascades are widespread through all of the earth's major biomes with consistently positive effects on the abundance and biodiversity of associated organisms.

== Overview ==
Facilitation cascades occur when prevalent foundation species, or less abundant but ecologically important keystone species, are involved in a hierarchy of positive interactions and consist of a primary facilitator which positively affects one or more secondary facilitators which support a suite of beneficiary species. Facilitation cascades at a minimum have a primary and secondary facilitator, although tertiary, quaternary, etc. facilitators may be found in some systems.

A typical example of facilitation cascades in a tropical coastal ecosystem

=== Origin of concept and related terms ===
The term facilitation cascade was coined by Altieri, Silliman, and Bertness during a study on New England cobblestone beaches to explain the chain of positive interactions that allow a diverse community to exist in a habitat that is otherwise characterized by substrate instability, elevated temperatures, and desiccation stress. Cordgrass is able to establish independently, and then creates a stable and less stressful habitat for mussels which in turn provide hard substrates and damp crevice spaces to facilitates establishment of a community of invertebrates and algal species. Facilitation cascades differ from the facilitation model of succession because species accumulate in the ecosystem due to the direct and indirect effects of the primary and secondary facilitator, whereas in the succession, early species that play a facilitative role are, over time, replaced by later-stage species. The concept emphasizes the hierarchical organization of nature, in which a foundation species creates the basis for an entire community by building a unique habitat, as seen in coral reefs, kelp beds, or hemlock forests, and then secondary interactions (e.g., competition, predation, facilitation) among inhabitants refine community composition and ecological dynamics. The facilitation cascade concept was also foreshadowed by the observation that multiple ecosystem engineers can interact to have emergent synergistic effects.

Facilitation cascades thus represent a form of indirect interaction occurring over three or more levels, whereby one species impacts another via an intermediate species. Such indirect interactions are an important driver of community structure and ecosystem function that can be as frequent and influential as direct interactions. Facilitation cascades have far-reaching ecological impacts on the diversity and function of the ecosystem as the positive effects of a subset of organisms cascade through the community, as in trophic cascades. The effect size of facilitation cascades can rival or exceed that of trophic cascades, and the main distinction between the indirect positive effects of both facilitation cascades and trophic cascades is that the former is based on positive facilitative interactions whereas the latter is based on negative trophic interactions.

== Classic examples ==
Facilitation cascades are observed in all of earth's major ecosystem types, and representative examples illustrate their widespread importance as well as the diversity of cascades that arise. The significance of facilitation cascades is often apparent through direct observation, however, experimental manipulations with mimics offer strong evidence for the magnitude of interaction importance. For examples, using artificial mimics as replacements for primary and secondary foundation species allows for isolation of specific mechanisms that are hypothesized to underlie the cascading effects of facilitation on local ecosystem dynamics.

=== Marine ===
A classic example of facilitation cascades in the marine environment is the relationship between mangroves, seagrasses, and stony corals that are adjacent to one another in a seascape. These foundation species exchange resources and benefit each other by buffering against sedimentation and nutrient inputs from the terrestrial side, and reducing wave energy from the open ocean. This exemplifies how facilitation cascades can occur over a seascape through foundation species that are found adjacent to one another.

Another common example in marine ecosystems is where seagrass, a primary habitat-forming ecosystem engineer, facilitates bivalves such as mussels by providing them with refuge from predators and stable attachment substrate. In turn, the bivalves act as secondary habitat formers, facilitating epifaunal organisms by providing them with substrate to attach and settle. Since the bivalves can provide nutrient subsidies to the seagrass, this is an example of a common structure of facilitation cascades where the secondary facilitators have a positive effect on primary facilitators, such that there is mutualism within the cascade.

=== Transitional (intertidal) ===
On the cobblestone beaches of New England, cordgrasse ameliorates physical stress for the establishment of ribbed mussels which further facilitating increased diversity within the intertidal ecosystem as secondary foundation species. This is the interaction from which the facilitation cascade concept was formed. This complex habitat has also shown how facilitation cascades can increases invasibility because non-native crabs live on and among ribbed mussels, providing a mechanisms to explain positive relationships between native diversity and invasion success, and the co-existence of native and invasive species through differential use of microhabitats associated with the cascade. In salt marshes, the same species of cordgrass and mussels have also been shown to increase biodiversity, multifunctionality, and resilience to disturbance.

Oyster reefs stabilize the intertidal environment by reducing sediment erosion. This enhances growth of marsh grasses which act as secondary foundation species, facilitating invertebrates including bivalves, insects and birds. The places with oyster reefs and intertidal marshes have been observed to support a higher biodiversity and abundance of inhabitants compared to sites inhabited by only one of those foundation species.

Mangrove forests along the coast of Australia trap drifting seaweed among their pneumatophores, which this seaweed supports many mollusks through habitat creation and shelter from predation. This example is notable because it involves a foundation species (mangroves) increasing their facilitative effect by aggregating a drifting secondary species from nearby rocky reefs.

Another example in transitional environments includes the facilitation of seaweed assemblages in soft-bottom shallow lagoons by gardening tube forming polychaetes that actively incorporate seaweed fragments to reduce predation and increase food-supply. The seaweed subsequently provides habitats and supports the high diversity of small epiphytes, invertebrates, and fish in an otherwise bare soft sediment system. This example is notable because the secondary habitat-forming seaweed is invasive in this region.

=== Terrestrial ===
A classic example of a terrestrial facilitation cascade includes tropical rainforest trees as the facilitating epiphytes which in turn facilitate the abundance of inhabitant invertebrate species by providing a complex, diverse habitat. For example, about half of the invertebrate biomass and abundance of invertebrates was observed to be dependent on secondary epiphyte habitats, suggesting that early estimates of the notably high arthropod diversity in tropical forests may in part be driven by facilitation cascades. This example is notable due to the different taxonomic composition and larger size of insects found in the secondary, intermediate habitat when compared with that of the primary foundation tree species representing the basal habitat. In temperate forests, a similar cascade unfolds in which facilitation of Spanish moss by oak trees increases invertebrate diversity. In this example, the Spanish moss depends on the oak to reduce physical stress and the invertebrates are reliant on the Spanish moss to increase moisture and lower predation stress.

Another terrestrial facilitation cascade includes trees, mistletoe, and birds, where trees are the primary foundation species that facilitates mistletoe, a secondary foundation species, which then facilitates the nesting and feeding of local and migratory birds. This example has been observed in multiple places around the world from pine forests in southeastern Spain to semi-arid southeastern Zimbabwean savannas. The example is notable because mistletoes can be parasitic and have a negative effect on their tree hosts, which is a reminder that the direction and strength of interactions associated with facilitation cascades can be context-dependent.

=== Freshwater ===
A classic freshwater facilitation cascade includes freshwater plants facilitating growth of algal filaments which in turn facilitate snails. Here, the plants act as primary foundation species, while the algal filaments, attached by plant holdfasts, are secondary foundation species, facilitating the snail inhabitant. This example is significant due to the chemical signals sent from secondary foundation species to attract the diversity of inhabitant snail to the cascade habitat.

However, only a few studies appear to have documented freshwater facilitation cascades, and it remains to be determined whether this is a function of the ecosystem structure or simply a reflection of historic research perspectives.

== Scale and ecological feedbacks ==
=== Spatial configuration ===
The primary and secondary foundation species that make up a facilitation cascade can occur in one of two spatial configurations. First are nested configurations in which the two foundation species are found intermixed or with one facilitator living on another, as in a mangrove pneumatophore providing a surface for oyster colonization. Second are adjacent configurations in which the facilitative species are found segregated across the landscape, as in oyster reefs near salt marshes, or coral reefs adjacent to seagrass. Whether foundation species in a cascade are found in adjacent or nested configurations depends on whether competition for resources at some scale drives one foundation species to displace another. The stress gradient hypothesis has proven useful for predicting which configuration is likely to prevail. In some instances there is scale dependence of the interactions, where competition over short distances leads to zonation of foundation species with distinct borders, and facilitation over longer distances occurs between the organisms in these zones. Facilitation cascades can also be structured as patches on the landscape that arise either because a primary and secondary habitat-forming species co-occur in patches, or a secondary habitat-former exists in patches within a large continuous habitat created by the primary habitat-former.

=== Temporal variation ===
The strength of facilitation cascades can also vary across temporal scales. Spatial scale can be influenced by how rapidly a foundation species grows or reproduces, as well as how long the effect of facilitation takes to impact other species within the system. This can be due to the time necessary for a foundation species to reach a minimum individual or patch size to create a facilitative effect for the system, lags in the demographic response in the beneficiary species to the positive effects of a facilitator, or seasonality or some other temporal variability in the stress that the facilitator ameliorates. Phenological matching or mismatching of life cycles may also influence the co-occurrence of participants in a facilitation cascade and therefore the strength of their interaction. For example, hatching of insects that coincides with flowering of the plants they pollinate which are in turn used as habitat for other species later in that year.

=== Dispersal and movement ===
Movement of organisms can mediate the occurrence and importance of facilitation cascades in three ways. First, movement of a facilitative species to a location with another facilitative species can bring together the components for a facilitation cascade. For examples, algae from a rocky shore that drifts into mangrove root habitat together can facilitate a variety of mobile invertebrates. Second, species that benefit from a facilitation cascade may move beyond the cascade habitat (i.e., spillover) and play an ecologically important role in adjacent habitats. On cobble beaches, for example, an invasive shore crabs utilizes a cordgrass-mussel facilitation cascade as a nursery habitat, but then as adults move into adjacent unvegetated intertidal habitats where they compete with native mud crabs. For highly mobile beneficiary species, such as those with more distant ontogenetic habitat shifts, large foraging ranges, or the capability of long-distance migrations, the reach of the facilitation cascade may be quite extensive. Third, mobile organisms may serve as a facilitative link in a cascade that plays across habitats distantly located on a landscape, as in mangroves that may facilitate coral reefs through the movement of parrotfish that use the mangrove as a nursery habitat and then move to a coral reef where they graze nuisance algae that would otherwise smother corals. More generally, these movements of individuals can serve as a biogeochemical or trophic link between ecosystems, leading to nutrient subsidies and feedbacks that sustain the foundation species that form the basis of facilitation cascades and providing the basis for meta-ecosystems.

== Ecological significance ==
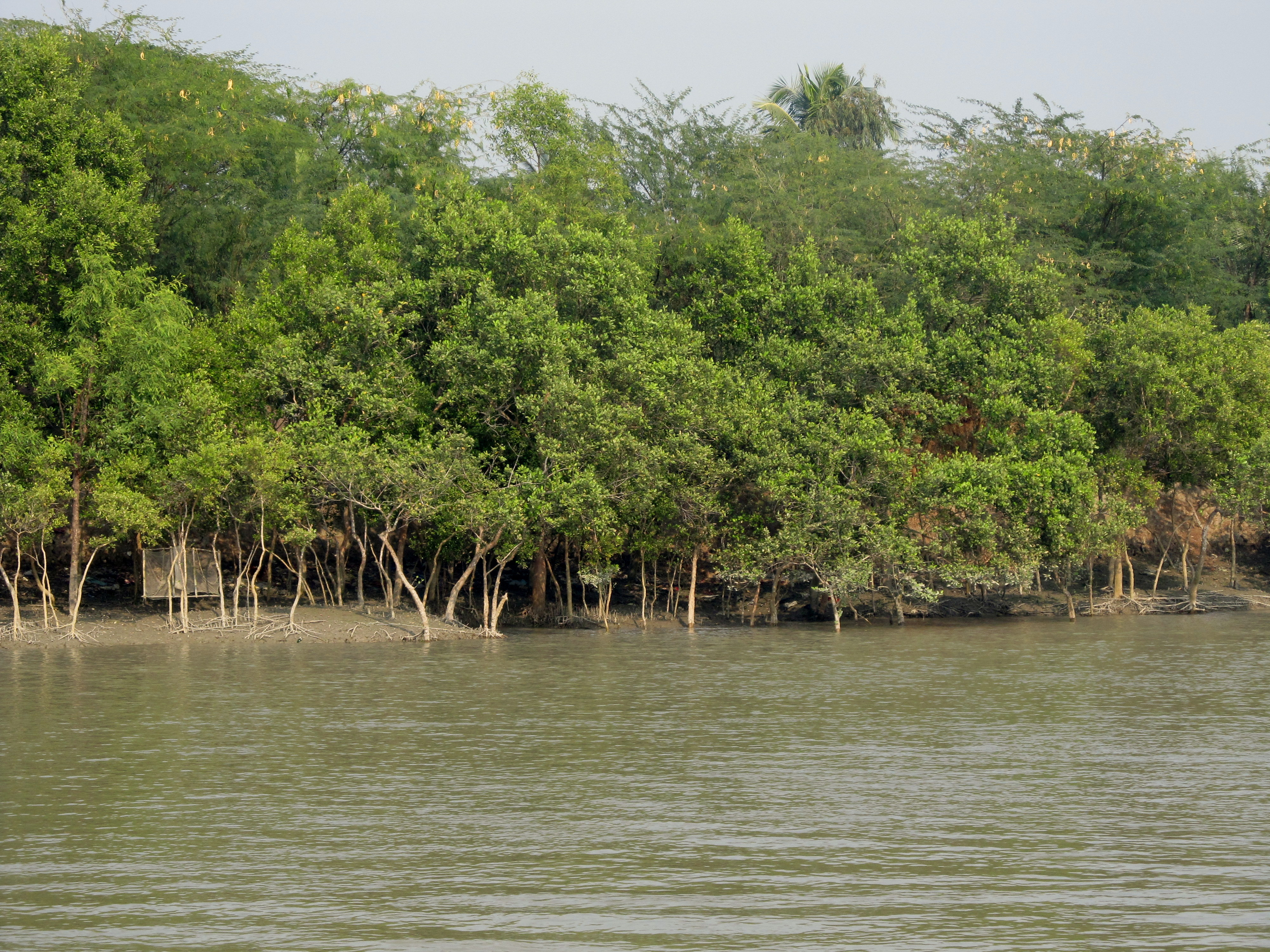
Mangrove forest of the Sundarbans at the Bay of Bengal on the Indian subcontinent; mangroves trap sediment and disperse erosive wave energy

=== Biodiversity ===
Facilitation cascades have strong positive effects on biodiversity at local or patch scale via direct and indirect facilitation. Within a facilitation cascade, primary and secondary foundation can increase organismal survival, species richness, niche diversity, and habitat complexity, in turn enhancing biodiversity. Primary habitat-formers can provide suitable substrate for colonization by secondary habitat-formers unique traits that contribute to increased heterogeneity enhancement of biodiversity.

=== Ecosystem functioning ===
Given the close relationship between biodiversity and ecosystem function, facilitation cascades will have strong indirect effect on ecosystem function due their enhancement of biodiversity. Facilitation cascades can also have a strong direct effect on a number of ecological functions that arise through creation of physical structure. The most immediately obvious benefit is the provision of additional habitat that provides living spaces for more and different organisms. The structure, which is typically more complex than areas outside a facilitation cascade habitat can function as a refuge from predation refuge or physical stresses. Other important functions include soil accretion, altered infiltration rates, and translocation of resources. Through these functions, other emergent ecological properties arise such as increased non-trophic species interaction across multiple trophic levels.

== Challenges ==
=== Threats ===
Facilitation cascades can promote ecosystem stability and resilience through positive species interactions. With increasing stress associated with climate change and other anthropogenic impacts, positive interactions will become increasingly important in maintaining ecosystem stability. However, stresses imposed by a threat may, beyond a certain threshold, have detrimental impacts on foundation species, and thereby lead to breakdown of the facilitation cascade.

==== Natural disasters ====
Natural disasters, such as earthquakes, natural fires, avalanches and volcanic activities can break down facilitation cascades by killing the foundation species. For example, a seismic uplift in New Zealand associated with the Kaikōura 2016 earthquake caused immediate mortality of both primary and secondary foundation seaweeds followed by cascading destruction of invertebrate biodiversity. These foundation species had not recovered by 2021, and large-scale natural disasters could potentially have legacies on facilitation cascades over decades to centuries as a function of recovery rates of habitat forming organisms.

==== Climate change ====
Mutualistic relationships and positive interactions that form the basis of facilitation cascades can ameliorate the impact of increased physical stresses such as drought, temperature extremes, and inundation time associated with climate change. For example, the mutualistic interaction between mussels and cordgrass can increase drought resilience in marsh ecosystems. While these facilitative interactions within a cascade may provide relief from increasing abiotic stresses, they are also vulnerable to the impacts of climate change themselves. Due to interspecific differences in thermotolerance and shifting abundances and distributions of species involved in a cascade, alteration or breakdown of the facilitation cascade may occur due to loss of any component in the cascade. For example, in the marine environment, high temperatures result in coral bleaching and disease, disrupting the relationship between coral host and its symbiotic algae and having downstream impacts on the biodiversity of the system.

==== Pollution ====
The introduction of harmful or toxic substances into the environment is a threat to facilitation cascades. Nutrient pollution may initially appear to benefit facilitation cascades by stimulating growth of habitat forming species, but ultimately negative effects associated with excess biomass, such as physically smothering and biogeochemical stressors including oxygen depletion and sulfide toxicity, can overwhelm the facilitation cascade. For example, excessive amounts of nutrients can stimulate prolific growth of secondary foundation species such as seaweed in otherwise oligotrophic seagrass systems, resulting in altered competitive hierarchies where the seaweed outcompetes the seagrass. In other instances, eutrophication can lead to an outright replacement of habitat dominants, such as when macroalgae replaces corals on reefs, leading to a change or loss in components of a facilitation cascade and there a shift in the broader community.

==== Disease ====
Disease prevalence and severity are predicted to increase in response to global changes, though its impacts on facilitation cascades remain relatively understudied. High endemic biodiversity, such as that favored by a facilitation cascade, generally decreases the risk of pathogen transmission. However, disease outbreaks that impact a facilitator can reduce its density or alter its phenotype, thereby reducing habitat complexity which dampens its facilitative effects with negative effects on biodiversity.

==== Overexploitation ====
Facilitation cascades promote biodiversity and species abundance through positive interactions, which could counteract the consequences of overexploitation. However, harvest of primary or secondary facilitators themselves within the cascade can lead to downstream reductions in species richness, thereby weakening the overexploited species' facilitative effects. For example, harvest of trees can reduce the abundance and diversity of epiphytes that provide shelter and other resources of beneficiary insect communities.

==== Invasive species ====
The successful establishment of a nonnative species into a new habitat may be expedited by the habitat provisioning and physical stress amelioration of the facilitation cascade that also promotes high native biodiversity. Furthermore, invasive species may be able to better exploit the benefits of facilitation cascades over native species, leading to spillover effects into nearby habitats and further contributing to their invasion success. Invasive species may also be habitat-forming foundation species capable of initiating their own facilitation cascades as in invasive seaweeds incorporated into worm tubes or invasive kelps that co-occur with native mussels.

== Applications in conservation and restoration ==
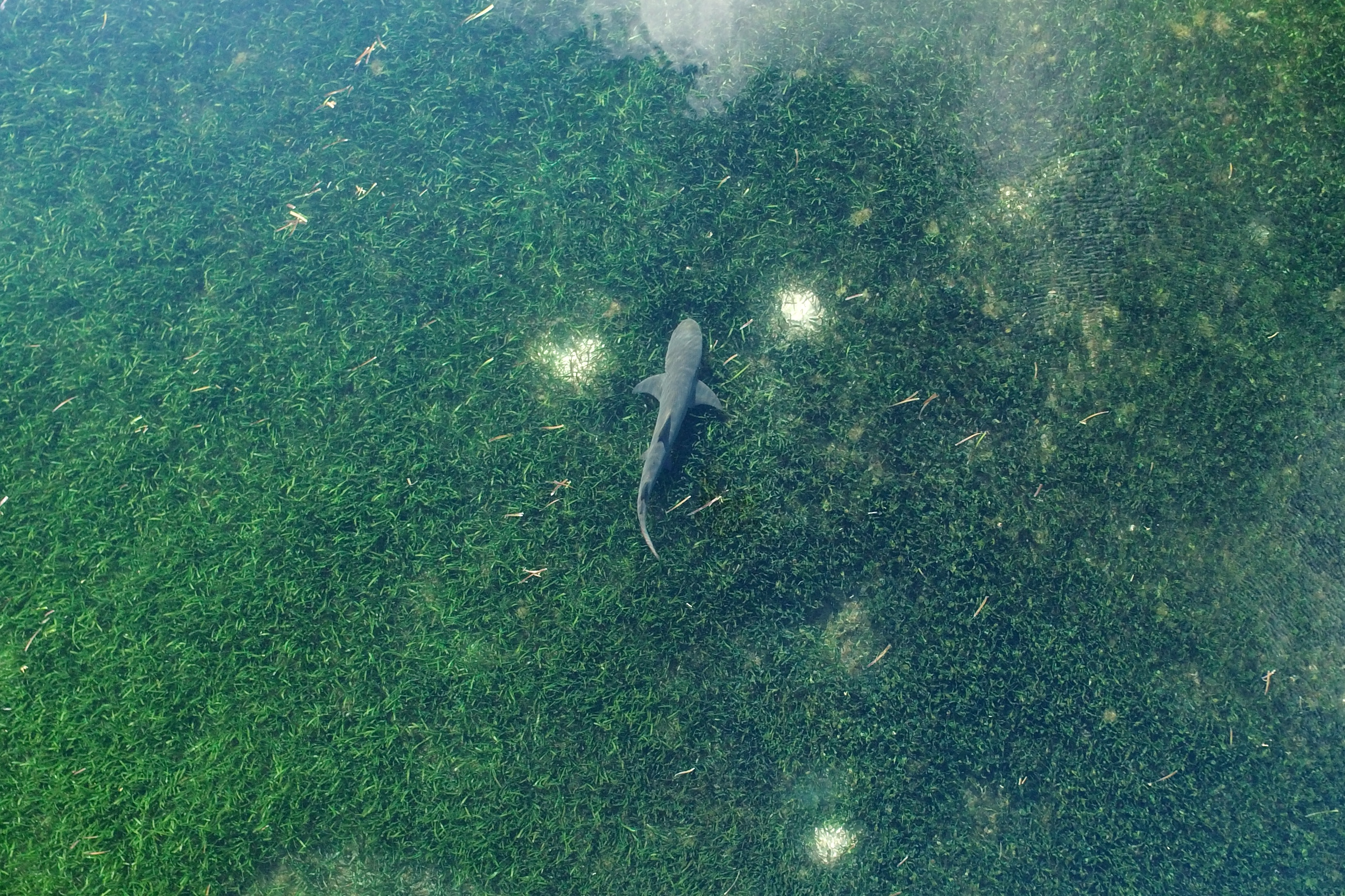
A shark grazes the seagrass meadow at Dongsha Atoll National Park in the South China Sea

Positive interactions can play a critical role in the conservation and restoration of natural systems, and a decision framework to guide practitioners in the incorporation of positive interactions to meet project goals and ecosystem services has been developed. This model can be extended to facilitation cascades which can be harnessed to enhance conservation and restoration. For example, the facilitators within a cascade can be identified as focal or indicator species for monitoring and protection in conservation plans given that these species are likely to support elevated biodiversity and species abundance. Furthermore, the species in a facilitation cascade can be candidate species for restoration due to their ability to initiate community assembly and the complex network of species interactions that underlie important ecosystem properties such as resilience. Finally, engineering with facilitating species in a cascade often provides complementary functions that both enhance the performance of one another and lead to beneficial outcomes that might not be possible with any single species. This is apparent, for example, in shoreline stabilization and enhancement projects where oysters are paired with marsh grasses in which oysters reduce wave energy and erosional stress in adjacent cordgrass zone which in turn builds shoreline and accrete elevational gains.

There are several considerations for practitioners as they incorporate facilitation cascades in their conservation and restoration projects. First, facilitation cascades may occur across multiple habitats through long distance interactions, and so the effectiveness of monitoring and outplanting projects may need to incorporate landscape-scale perspectives or risk failure if essential components of the system are left outside the project scope. Second, while many of the best examples of facilitation cascades in applied contexts come from foundation species or ecosystem engineers that are conspicuous habitat dominants, practitioners should keep in mind that facilitators in a cascade can also include smaller and/or mobile organisms, such as Pollinators that have a positive effect on the reproductive success of habitat-forming vegetation, or mutualists such as Symbiodinium in corals and mycorrhizal fungi in terrestrial plants. Third, facilitation cascades commonly incorporate multiple Trophic levels and/or disparate taxonomic and functional groups, and so restoration projects (or investigations for that matter) need to take a community-wide approach to their design. A 'plant restoration project' is unlikely to meet its management goals without considering the plant interactions with pollinators, invertebrates, epiphytes, etc. Fourth, species mimics may be necessary to jump start a facilitation cascade or replace a living component that may not be practically introduced. Such engineering approaches have already been demonstrated in projects such as seawalls. Finally, the overall importance of facilitation cascades is likely to increase with climate change as associated stressors such as elevated temperature and modified precipitation regimes intensify. Facilitation cascades may suddenly be apparent or important where they were previously undetected, and practitioners may become increasingly dependent on such ecological tools as adaptable and resilient components in their projects.
