= Habitat cascade =

A habitat cascade is a common type of a facilitation cascade. where "indirect positive effects on focal organisms are mediated by successive formation or modification of biogenic habitat".

A habitat cascade is composed of at least three organisms: a primary habitat former or modifier; a secondary habitat former or modifier; and a focal organism that utilizes the secondary habitat former or modifier. For example, primary habitat forming trees can provide habitat for secondary habitat forming epiphytes, lianas, or vines that again can provide habitat to focal organisms like insects and birds.

The primary vs. secondary habitat formers are sometimes referred to as ultimate vs. proximate habitat formers, basal vs. intermediate habitat formers, primary vs. secondary ecosystem engineers, primary vs. secondary foundation species, basibionts vs. epibionts, basizoids (if animal) or basiphytes (if plant) vs. epizooids (if animal) or epiphytes (if plant), or hosts vs. structural parasites. Focal organisms have been referred to as clients, end-users, habitat-users, inhabitants or hyperepibionts

Secondary habitat formers are typically attached to, entangled around, or embedded within the primary habitat former. Habitat cascades are strongest when the secondary habitat former is more effective than the primary habitat former at allowing focal organisms to avoid stress and enemies, and find resources and other facilitators.

Habitat cascades promote increased biodiversity in ecosystems dominated by large and long-lived sessile or slow-moving structural organisms. For example, habitat cascades have been documented in tropical forests, temperate forests, salt marshes, coral reefs, seagrass beds, mangrove stands, polychaete gardens, seaweed covered rocky coasts and mollusc reefs.
