= Seagrass meadow =

Underwater ecosystem

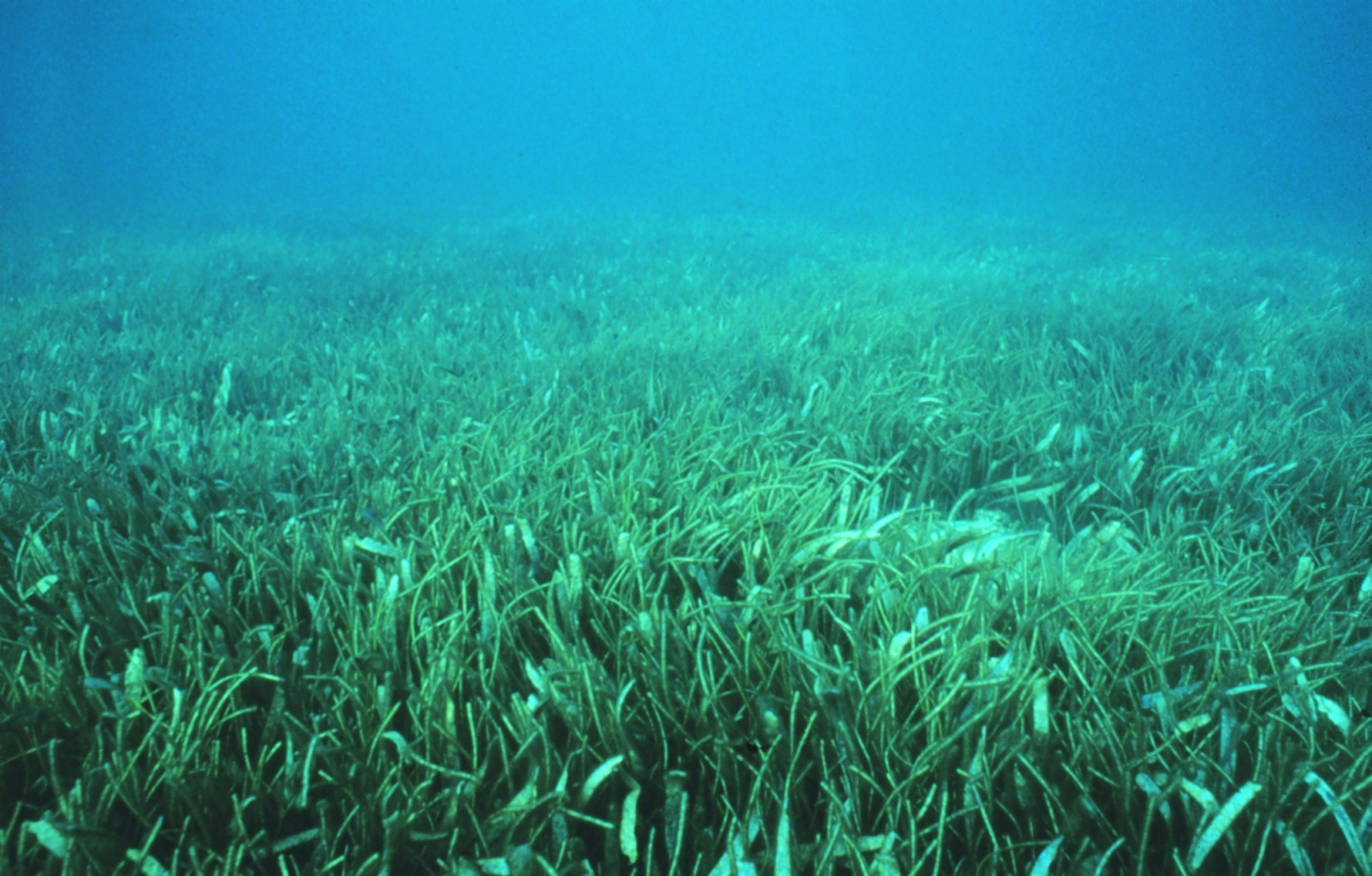
Seagrass meadows are major carbon sinks and highly productive nurseries for many marine species

A seagrass meadow or seagrass bed is an underwater ecosystem formed by seagrasses. Seagrasses are marine (saltwater) plants found in shallow coastal waters and in the brackish waters of estuaries. Seagrasses are flowering plants with stems and long green, grass-like leaves. They produce seeds and pollen and have roots and rhizomes which anchor them in seafloor sand.

Seagrasses form dense underwater meadows which are among the most productive ecosystems in the world. They provide habitats and food for a diversity of marine life comparable to that of coral reefs. This includes invertebrates like shrimp and crabs, cod and flatfish, marine mammals and birds. They provide refuges for endangered species such as seahorses, turtles, and dugongs. They function as nursery habitats for shrimps, scallops and many commercial fish species. Seagrass meadows provide coastal storm protection by the way their leaves absorb energy from waves as they hit the coast. They keep coastal waters healthy by absorbing bacteria and nutrients, and slow the speed of climate change by sequestering carbon dioxide into the sediment of the ocean floor.

Seagrasses evolved from marine algae which colonized land and became land plants, and then returned to the ocean about 100 million years ago. However, today seagrass meadows are being damaged by human activities such as pollution from land runoff, fishing boats that drag dredges or trawls across the meadows uprooting the grass, and overfishing which unbalances the ecosystem. Seagrass meadows are currently being destroyed at a rate of about 3 square metres per second (1,900 sq ft/min).

== Background ==
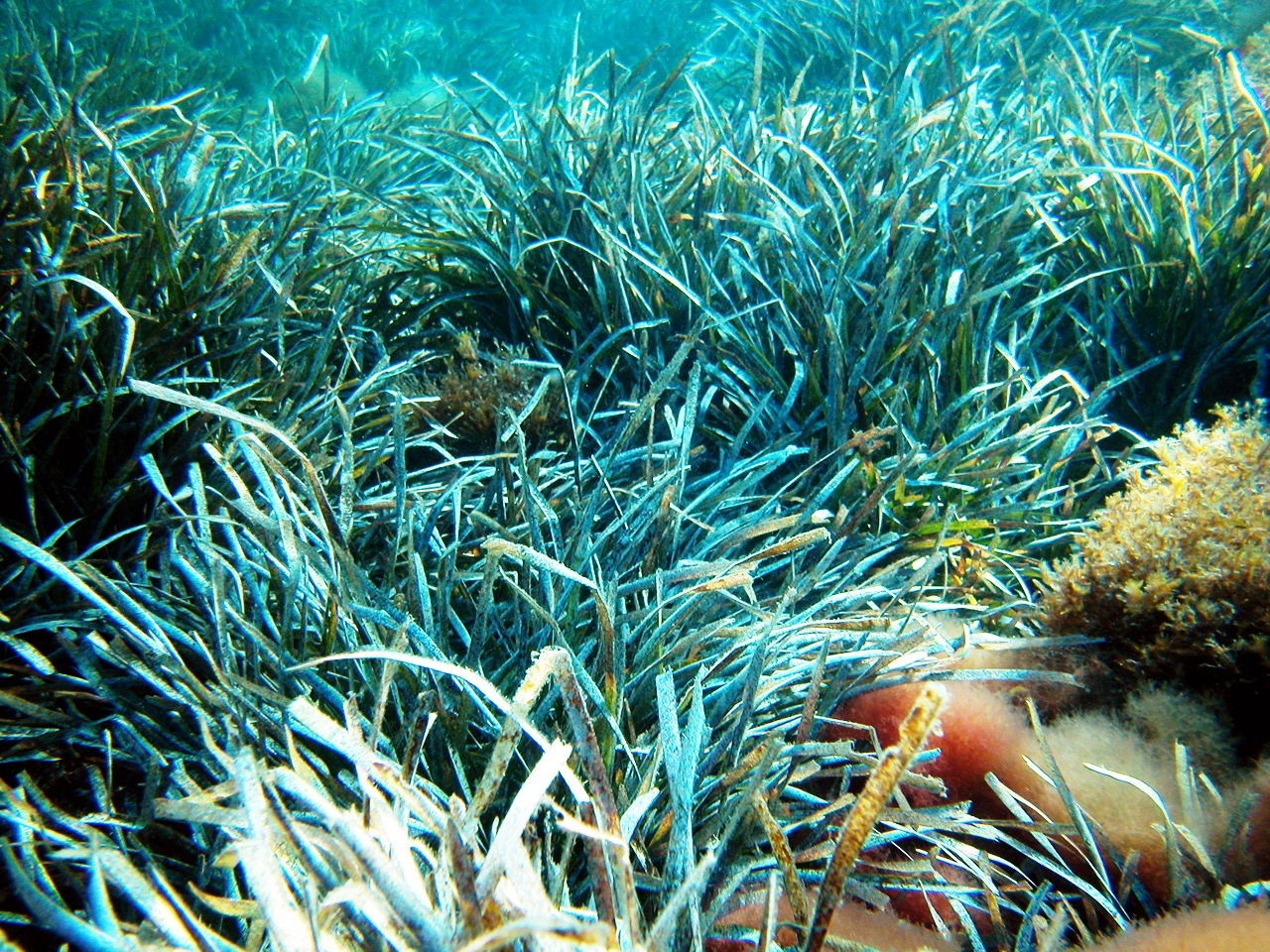
Seagrasses are terrestrial plants that transitioned to the marine environment. They are the only flowering plants that live in the ocean.

Seagrasses are flowering plants (angiosperms) which grow in marine environments. They evolved from terrestrial plants which migrated back into the ocean about 75 to 100 million years ago. In the present day they occupy the sea bottom in shallow and sheltered coastal waters anchored in sand or mud bottoms.

There are four lineages of seagrasses containing relatively few species (all in a single order of monocotyledon). They occupy shallow environments on all continents except Antarctica: their distribution also extends to the High Seas, such as on the Mascarene Plateau.

Seagrasses are formed by a polyphyletic group of monocotyledons (order Alismatales), which recolonised marine environments about 80 million years ago. Seagrasses are habitat-forming species because they are a source of food and shelter for a wide variety of fish and invertebrates, and they perform relevant ecosystem services.

There are about 60 species of fully marine seagrasses belonging to four families (Posidoniaceae, Zosteraceae, Hydrocharitaceae and Cymodoceaceae), all in the order Alismatales (in the class of monocotyledons). Seagrasses beds or meadows can be made up of either a single species (monospecific) or mixed. In temperate areas one or a few species usually dominate (like the eelgrass Zostera marina in the North Atlantic), whereas tropical beds are usually more diverse, with up to thirteen species recorded in the Philippines. Like all autotrophic plants, seagrasses photosynthesize, in the submerged photic zone. Most species undergo submarine pollination and complete their life cycle underwater.

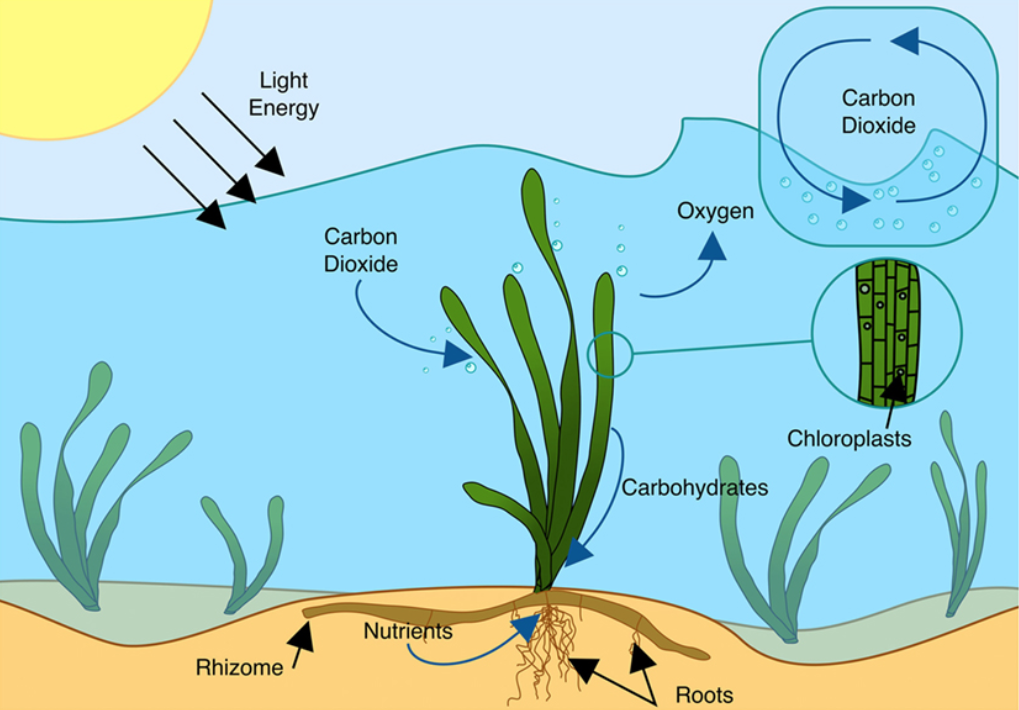
Carbon uptake and photosynthesis in a seagrass meadow. Special cells within the seagrass, called chloroplasts, use energy from the sun to convert carbon dioxide and water into carbohydrates (or sugar) and oxygen through photosynthesis. Seagrass roots and rhizomes absorb and store nutrients and help to anchor the seagrass plants in place.

Seagrass meadows are found in depths up to about 50 metres (160 ft), depending on water quality and light availability. These seagrass meadows are highly productive habitats that provide many ecosystem services, including protecting the coast from storms and big waves, stabilising sediment, providing safe habitats for other species and encouraging biodiversity, enhancing water quality, and sequestering carbon and nutrients.

Seagrass meadows are sometimes called prairies of the sea. They are diverse and productive ecosystems sheltering to and harbouring species from all phyla, such as juvenile and adult fish, epiphytic and free-living macroalgae and microalgae, mollusks, bristle worms, and nematodes. Few species were originally considered to feed directly on seagrass leaves (partly because of their low nutritional content), but scientific reviews and improved working methods have shown that seagrass herbivory is an important link in the food chain, feeding hundreds of species, including green turtles, dugongs, manatees, fish, geese, swans, sea urchins and crabs. Some fish species that visit or feed on seagrasses raise their young in adjacent mangroves or coral reefs.

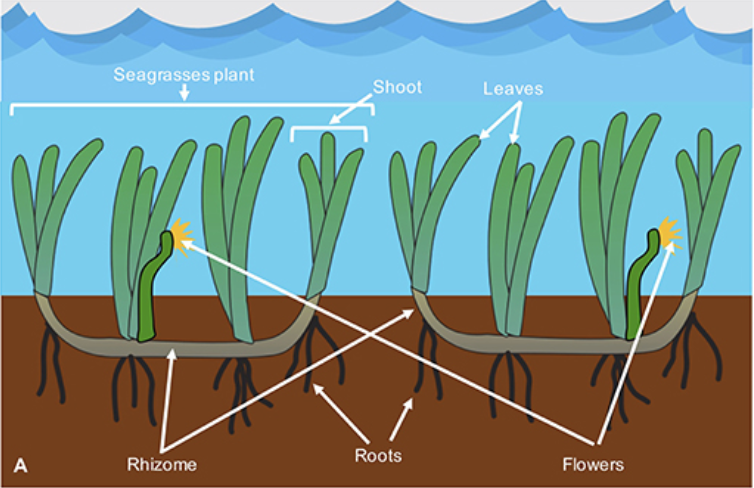
Seagrasses differ from seaweeds. Where seaweeds use holdfasts to secure them to the seafloor and internally transport nutrients by diffusion, seagrasses are flowering plants with a rhizome and root system connecting them to the seafloor and a vascular system for internal transport.

Seagrass meadows are rich biodiverse ecosystems that occur all over the globe, in both tropical and temperate seas. They contain complex food webs that provide trophic subsidy to species and habitats way beyond the extent of their distribution. Given the wide variety of food sources provided by this productive habitat, it is no surprise that seagrass meadows support an equally wide array of grazers and predators. However, despite its importance for sustaining biodiversity and many other ecosystem services, the global distribution of seagrass is a fraction of what was historically present. Recent estimates from where records exist indicate that at least 20% of the world's seagrass has been lost. Seagrasses also provide other services in the coastal zone such as preventing coastal erosion, storing and trapping carbon and filtering the water column.

The true ecosystem-level consequences of such decline and the benefits that can be afforded through habitat restoration are poorly understood. Given the relatively high-per-unit area costs of marine habitat restoration, making the case for such work requires a thorough examination of the ecosystem service benefits of such new habitat creation.

== Global distribution ==
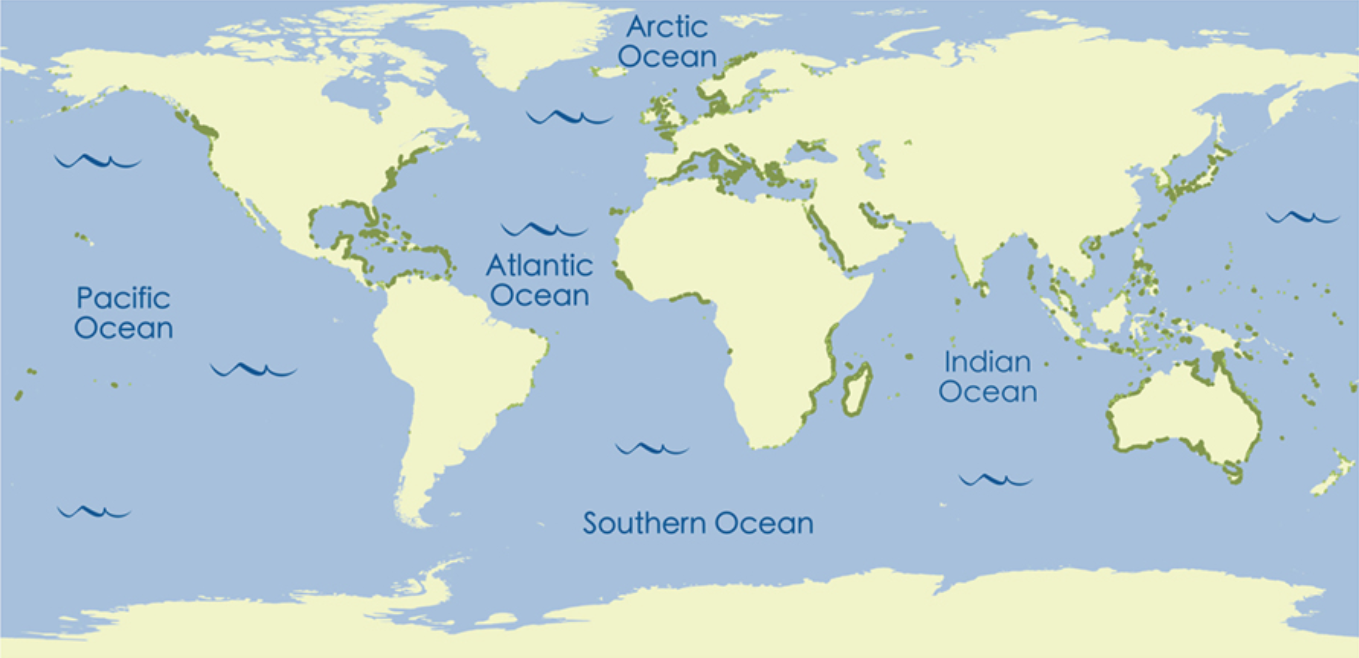
Global distribution of seagrass meadows

Seagrass meadows are found in the shallow seas of the continental shelves of all continents except Antarctica. Continental shelves are underwater areas of land surrounding each continent, creating areas of relatively shallow water known as shelf seas. The grasses live in areas with soft sediment that are either intertidal (uncovered daily by seawater, as the tide goes in and out) or subtidal (always under the water). They prefer sheltered places, such as shallow bays, lagoons, and estuaries (sheltered areas where rivers flow in to the sea), where waves are limited and light and nutrient levels are high.

Seagrasses can survive to maximum depths of about 60 metres. However, this depends on the availability of light, because, like plants on the land, seagrass meadows need sunlight if photosynthesis is to occur. Tides, wave action, water clarity, and low salinity (low amounts of salt in the water) control where seagrasses can live at their shallow edge nearest the shore; all of these things must be right for seagrass to survive and grow.

The current documented seagrass area is 177,000 km^{2} (68,000 sq mi), but is thought to underestimate the total area since many areas with large seagrass meadows have not been thoroughly documented. Most common estimates are 300,000 to 600,000 km^{2}, with up to 4,320,000 km^{2} suitable seagrass habitat worldwide.

== Ecosystem services ==
Seagrass meadows provide coastal zones with significant ecosystem goods and services. They enhance water quality by stabilizing heavy metals and other toxic pollutants, as well as cleansing the water of excess nutrients, and lowering acidity levels in coastal waters. Further, because seagrasses are underwater plants, they produce significant amounts of oxygen which oxygenate the water column. Their root systems also assist in oxygenating the sediment, providing hospitable environments for sediment-dwelling organisms. Additionally, the conservation of seagrass meadows contributes to 16 of the 17 UN Sustainable Development Goals.

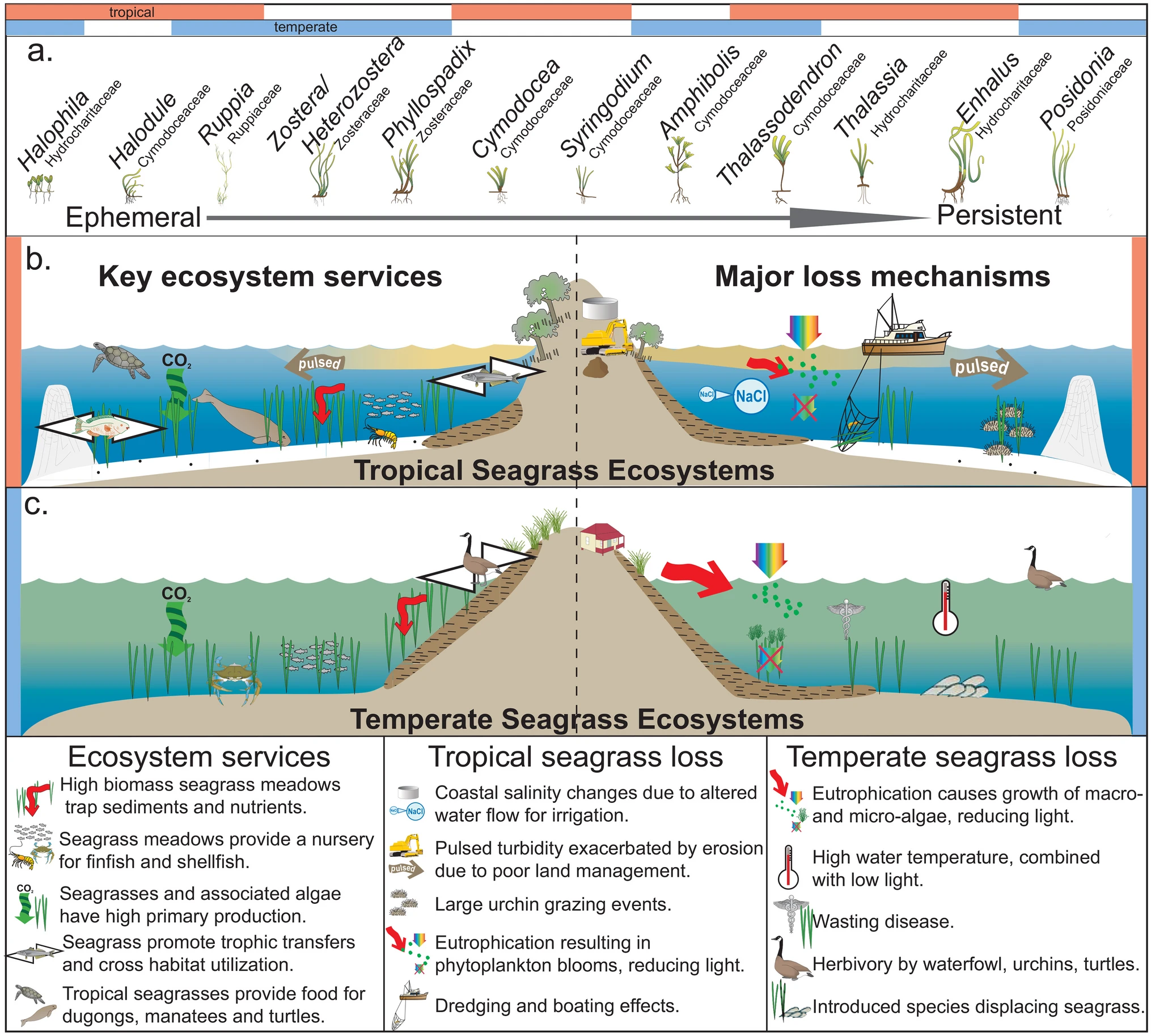
Seagrass ecosystem services and loss mechanisms

Many epiphytes can grow on the leaf blades of seagrasses, and algae, diatoms and bacterial films can cover the surface. The grass is eaten by turtles, herbivorous parrotfish, surgeonfish, and sea urchins, while the leaf surface films are a food source for many small invertebrates.

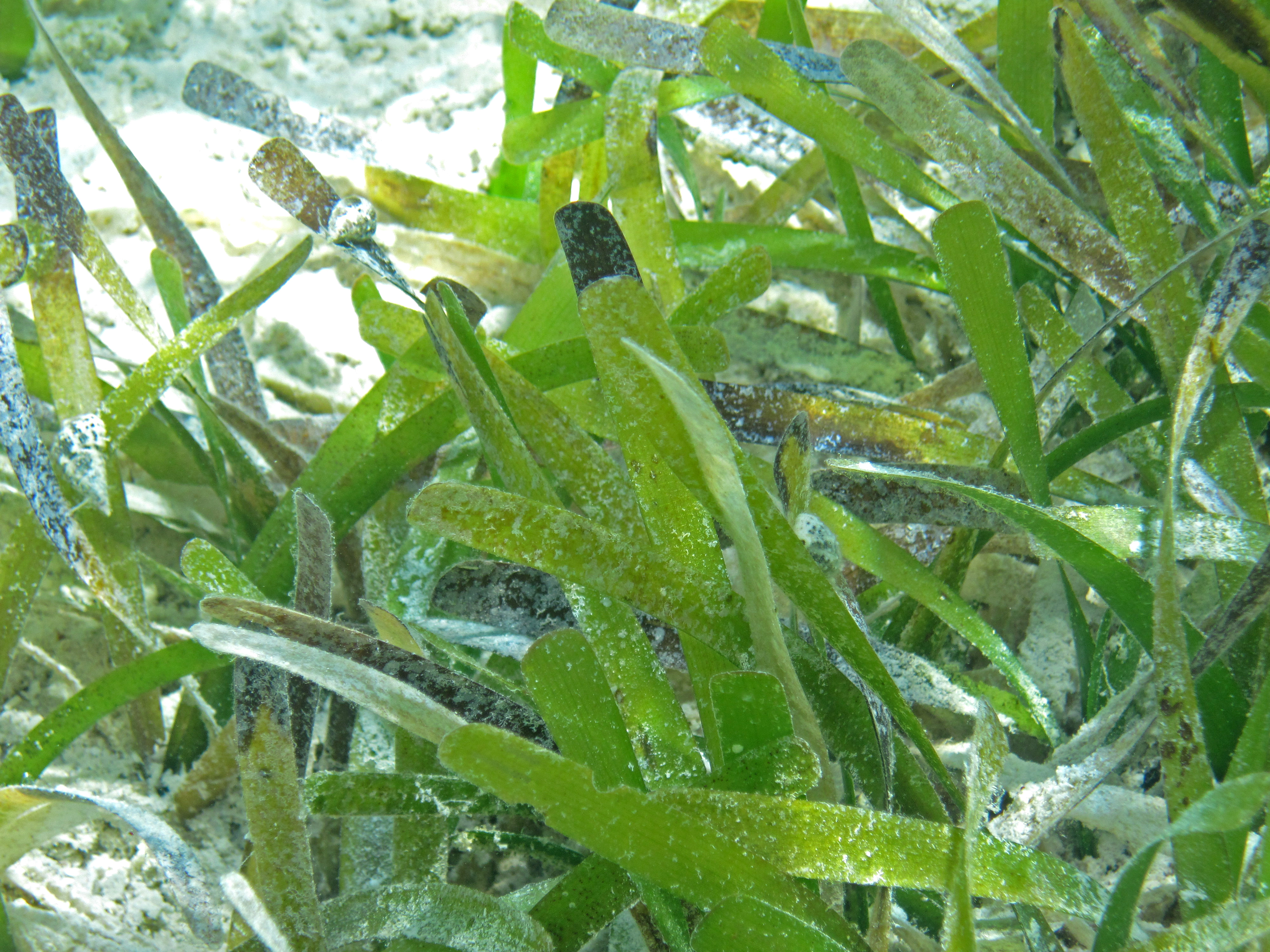
Epiphytes growing on the leaf blades of turtle grass

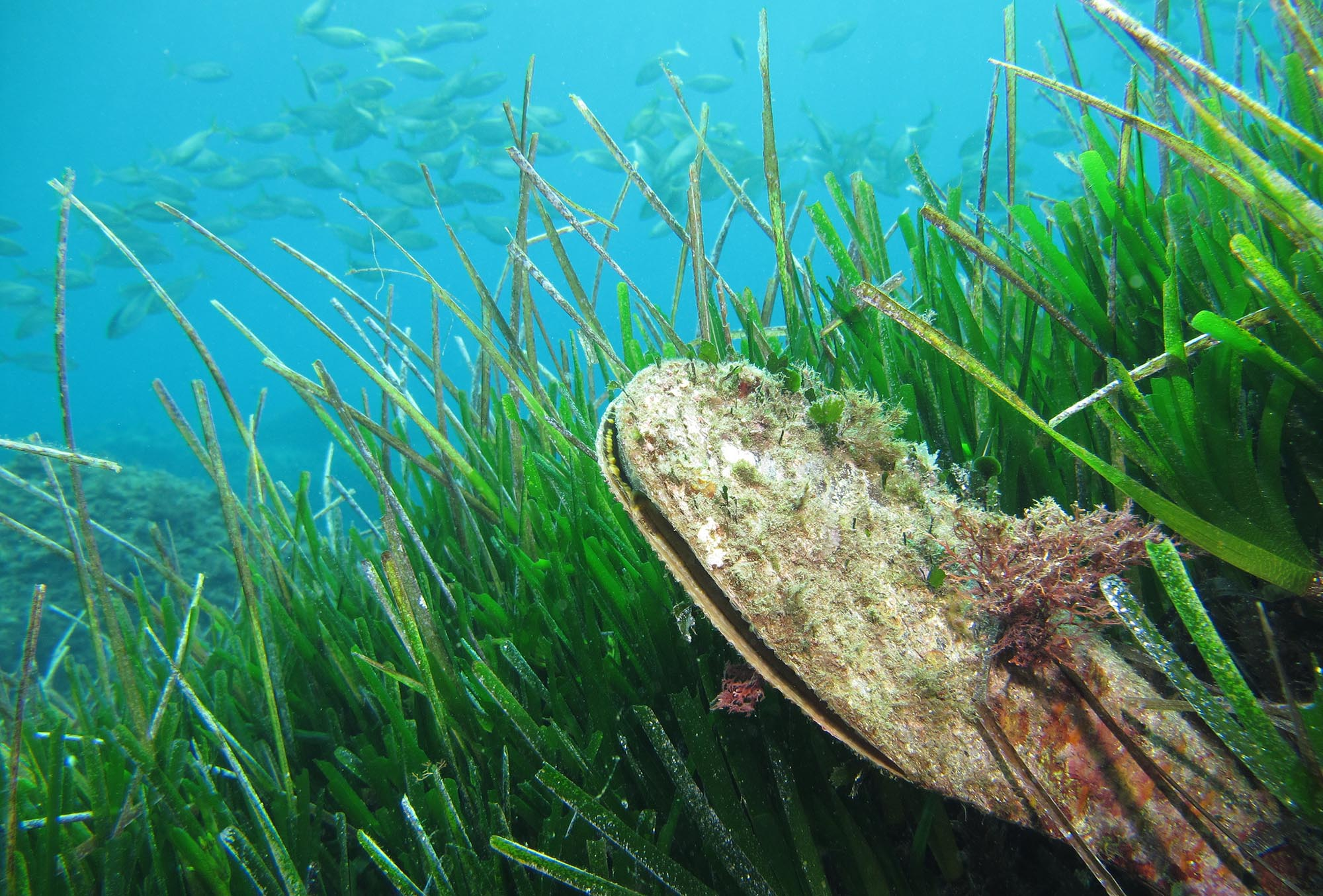
Fan mussel in a Mediterranean seagrass meadow

=== Blue carbon ===
The meadows also account for more than 10% of the ocean's total carbon storage. Per hectare, they hold twice as much carbon dioxide as rain forests and can sequester about 27 million tons of CO_{2} annually. This ability to store carbon is important as atmospheric carbon levels continue to rise.

Blue carbon refers to carbon dioxide removed from the atmosphere by the world's coastal marine ecosystems, mostly mangroves, salt marshes, seagrasses and potentially macroalgae, through plant growth and the accumulation and burial of organic matter in the sediment.

Although seagrass meadows occupy only 0.1% of the area of the ocean floor, they account for 10–18% of the total oceanic carbon burial. Currently global seagrass meadows are estimated to store as much as 19.9 Pg (petagrams or gigatons, equals a billion tons) of organic carbon. Carbon primarily accumulates in marine sediments, which are anoxic and thus continually preserve organic carbon from decadal-millennial time scales. High accumulation rates, low oxygen, low sediment conductivity and slower microbial decomposition rates all encourage carbon burial and carbon accumulation in these coastal sediments. Compared to terrestrial habitats that lose carbon stocks as CO_{2} during decomposition or by disturbances like fires or deforestation, marine carbon sinks can retain C for much longer time periods. Carbon sequestration rates in seagrass meadows vary depending on the species, characteristics of the sediment, and depth of the habitats, but on average the carbon burial rate is about 140 g C m^{−2} yr^{−1}.

=== Coastal protection ===
Seagrasses are also ecosystem engineers, which means they alter the ecosystem around them, adjusting their surroundings in both physical and chemical ways. The long blades of seagrasses slow the movement of water which reduces wave energy and offers further protection against coastal erosion and storm surge. Many seagrass species produce an extensive underground network of roots and rhizome which stabilizes sediment and reduces coastal erosion. Seagrasses are not only affected by water in motion; they also affect the currents, waves and turbulence environment.

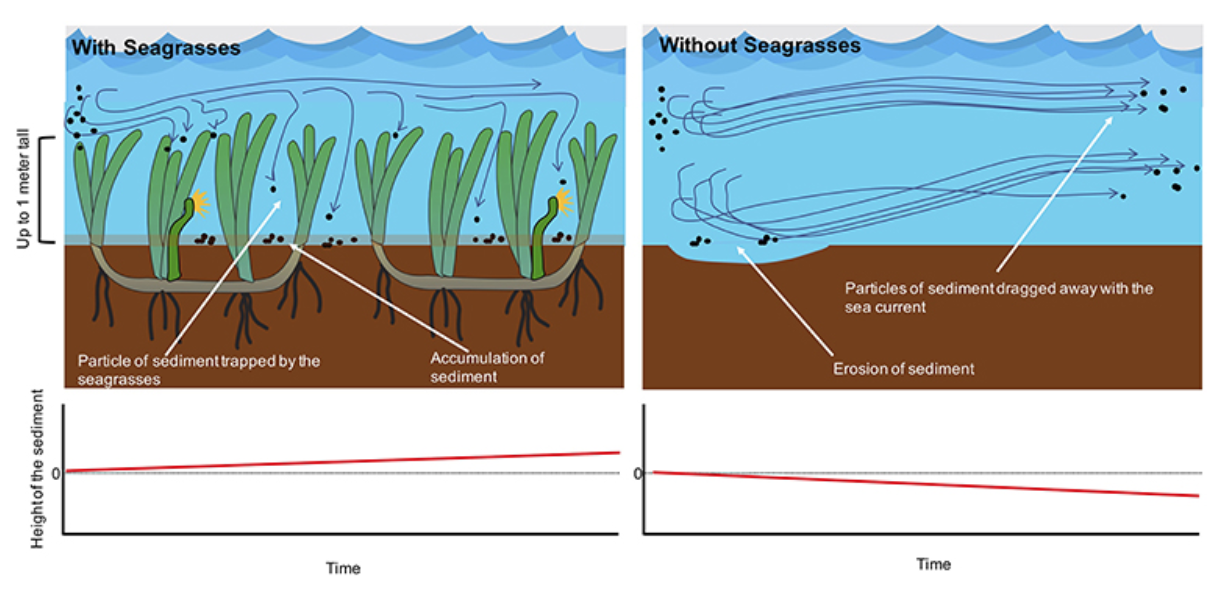
Seagrasses help trap sediment particles transported by sea currents.

Seagrasses help trap sediment particles transported by sea currents. The leaves, extending toward the sea surface, slow down the water currents. The slower current is not able to carry the particles of sediment, so the particles drop down and become part of the seafloor, eventually building it up. When seagrasses are not present, the sea current has no obstacles and carries the sediment particles away, lifting them and eroding the seafloor.

Simulation of wave attenuation by quasi-flexible, seagrass-like coastal vegetation

Seagrasses prevent erosion of the seafloor to the point that their presence can raise the seafloor. They contribute to coast protection by trapping rock debris transported by the sea. Seagrasses reduce erosion of the coast and protect houses and cities from both the force of the sea and from sea-level rise caused by global warming. They do this by reducing the wave energy with their leaves, and helping sediment transported in the seawater to accumulate on the seafloor. Seagrass leaves and their epiphytes act as baffles in turbulent water that slow down water movement and encourage particulate matter to settle out.

Archaeologists have learned from seagrasses how to protect underwater archaeological sites, like a site in Denmark where dozens of ancient Roman and Viking shipwrecks have been discovered. The archaeologists use seagrass-like covers as sediment traps, to build up sediment so that it buries the ships. Burial creates low-oxygen conditions and keeps the wood from rotting.

=== Links to seabirds ===
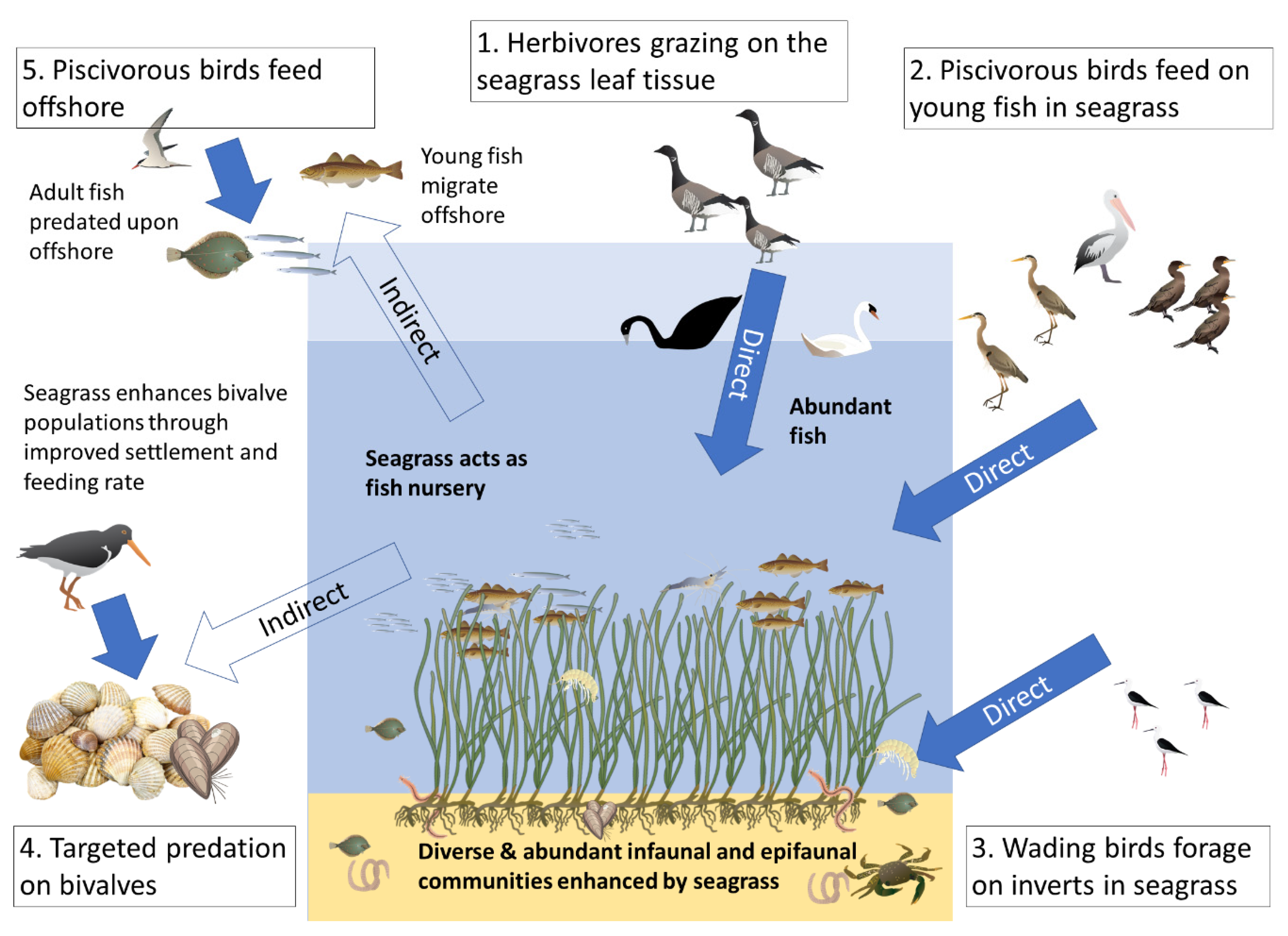
Hypothesised links in NE Atlantic coastal seas (1) direct consumption of seagrass (2,3) seagrass-associated fauna (4,5) indirect links from consumption of populations benefitting from seagrass

Birds are an often-overlooked part of marine ecosystems, not only are they crucial to the health of marine ecosystems, but their populations are also supported by the productivity and biodiversity of marine and coastal ecosystems. The links of birds to specific habitat types such as seagrass meadows are largely not considered except in the context of direct herbivorous consumption by wildfowl. This is despite the fact that both bottom-up and top-down processes have been considered as pathways for the population maintenance of some coastal birds.

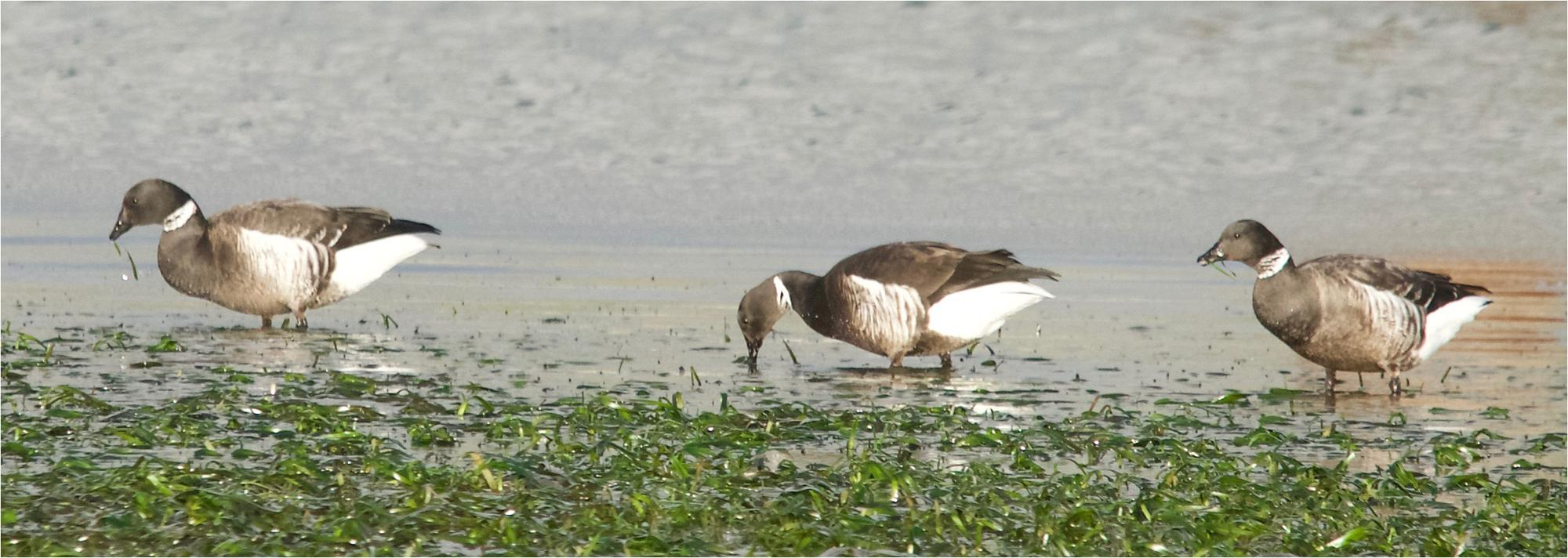
Pacific brant geese feeding on Zostera marina

Given the long-term decline in the population of many coastal and seabirds, the known response of many seabird populations to fluctuations in their prey, and the need for compensatory restorative actions to enhance their populations, there is a need for understanding the role of key marine habitats such as seagrass in supporting coastal and seabirds.

=== Nursery habitats for fisheries ===
Seagrass meadows provide nursery habitats for many commercially important fish species. It's estimated that about half of the global fisheries get their start because they are supported by seagrass habitats. If the seagrass habitats are lost, then the fisheries are lost as well. According to a 2019 paper by Unsworth et al, the significant role seagrass meadows play in supporting fisheries productivity and food security across the globe is not adequately reflected in the decisions made by authorities with statutory responsibility for their management. They argue that: (1) Seagrass meadows provide valuable nursery habitat to over 1/5th of the world's largest 25 fisheries, including walleye pollock, the most landed species on the planet. (2) In complex small‐scale fisheries from around the world (poorly represented in fisheries statistics), there is evidence that many of those in proximity to seagrass are supported to a large degree by these habitats. (3) Intertidal fishing activity in seagrass is a global phenomenon, often directly supporting human livelihoods. According to the study, seagrasses should be recognized and managed to maintain and maximize their role in global fisheries production. In 2022, Jones et al showed seagrass associated small-scale fisheries can provide a safety net for the poor, and are used more commonly than reef-associated fisheries across the Indo-Pacific. Nearly half the people interviewed in the study preferred fishing in seagrass, since their function as a nursery habitat could result in large and reliable catches of fish.

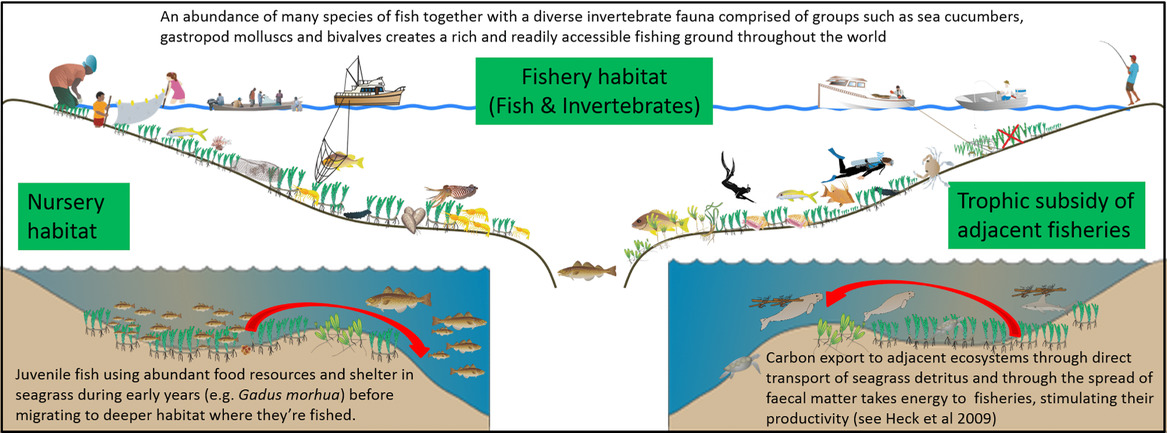
Seagrass meadows support global food security by (1) providing nursery habitat for fish stocks in adjacent and deep water habitats, (2) creating expansive fishery habitat rich in fauna, and (3) by providing trophic support to adjacent fisheries. They also provide support by promoting the health of fisheries associated with connected habitats, such as coral reefs.

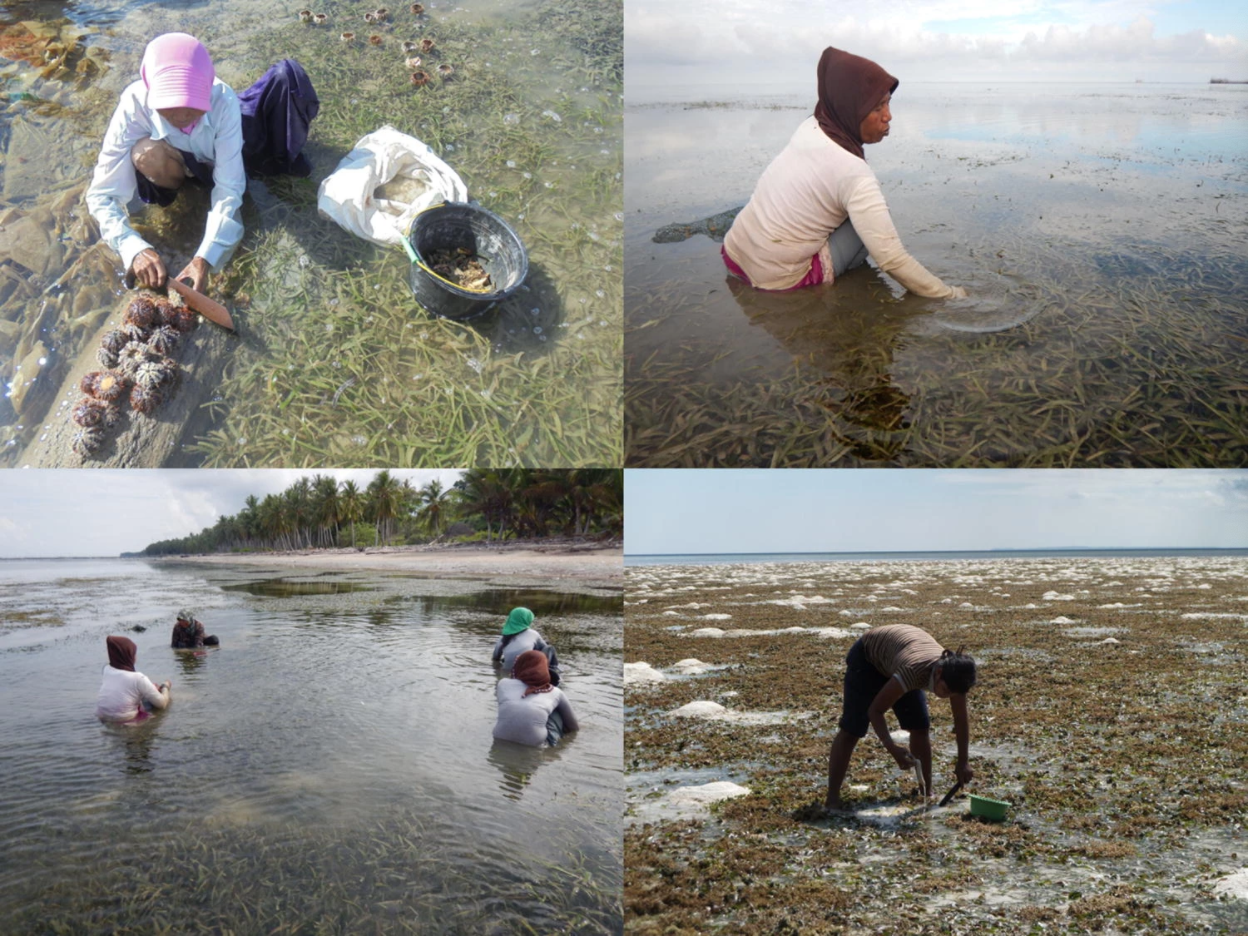
Gleaning a seagrass meadow

In the oceans, gleaning can be defined as fishing with basic gear, including bare hands, in shallow water not deeper than that one can stand. Invertebrate gleaning (walking) fisheries are common within intertidal seagrass meadows globally, contributing to the food supply of hundreds of millions of people, but understanding of these fisheries and their ecological drivers are extremely limited. A 2019 study by Nessa et al. analysed these fisheries using a combined social and ecological approach. Catches were dominated by bivalves, sea urchins and gastropods. The catch per unit effort (CPUE) in all sites varied from 0.05 to 3 kg per gleaner per hour, with the majority of fishers being women and children. Landings were of major significance for local food supply and livelihoods at all sites. Local ecological knowledge suggests seagrass meadows are declining in line with other regional trends. Increasing seagrass density significantly and positively correlated with CPUE of the invertebrate gleaning highlighting the importance of conserving these threatened habitats.

=== Gallery of species habitats ===
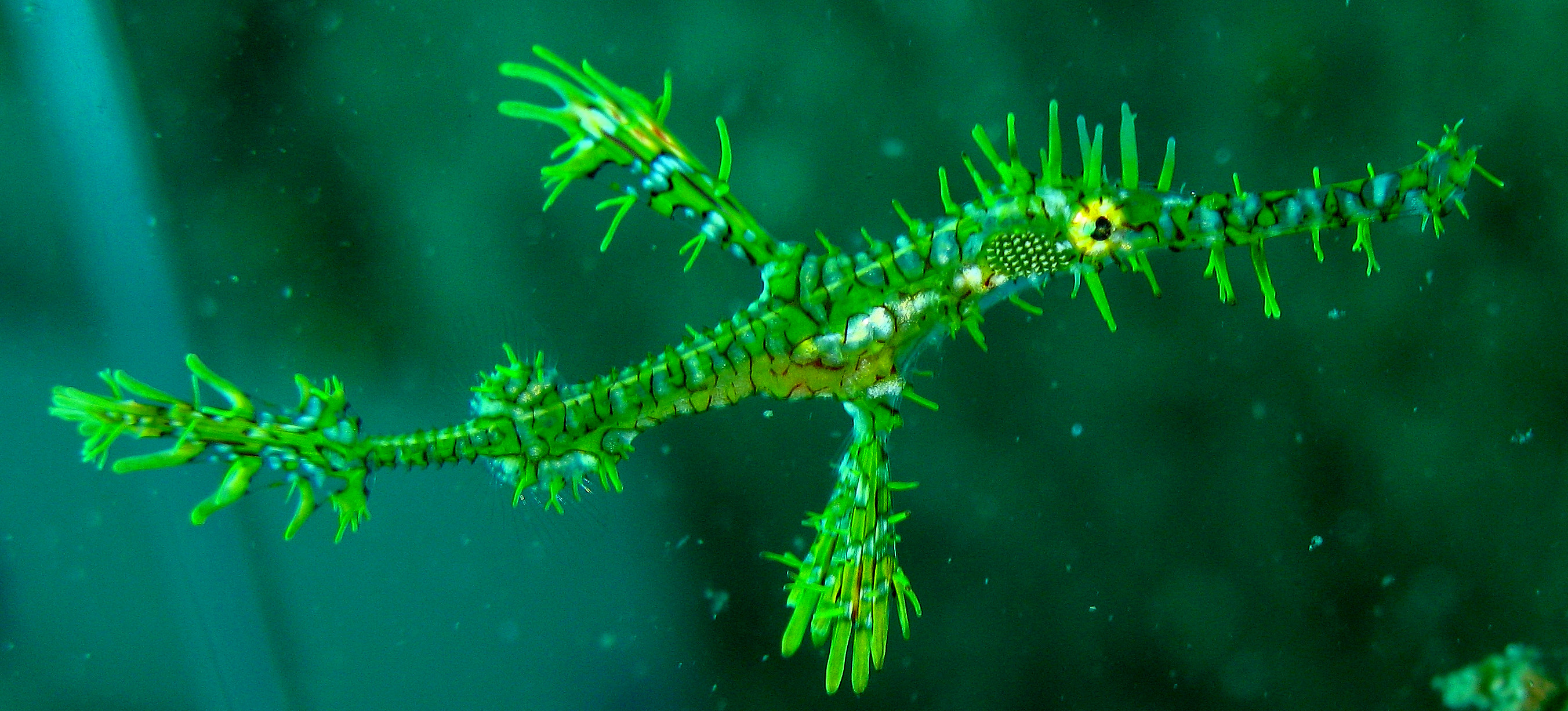
Ghost pipefish usually swim in pairs

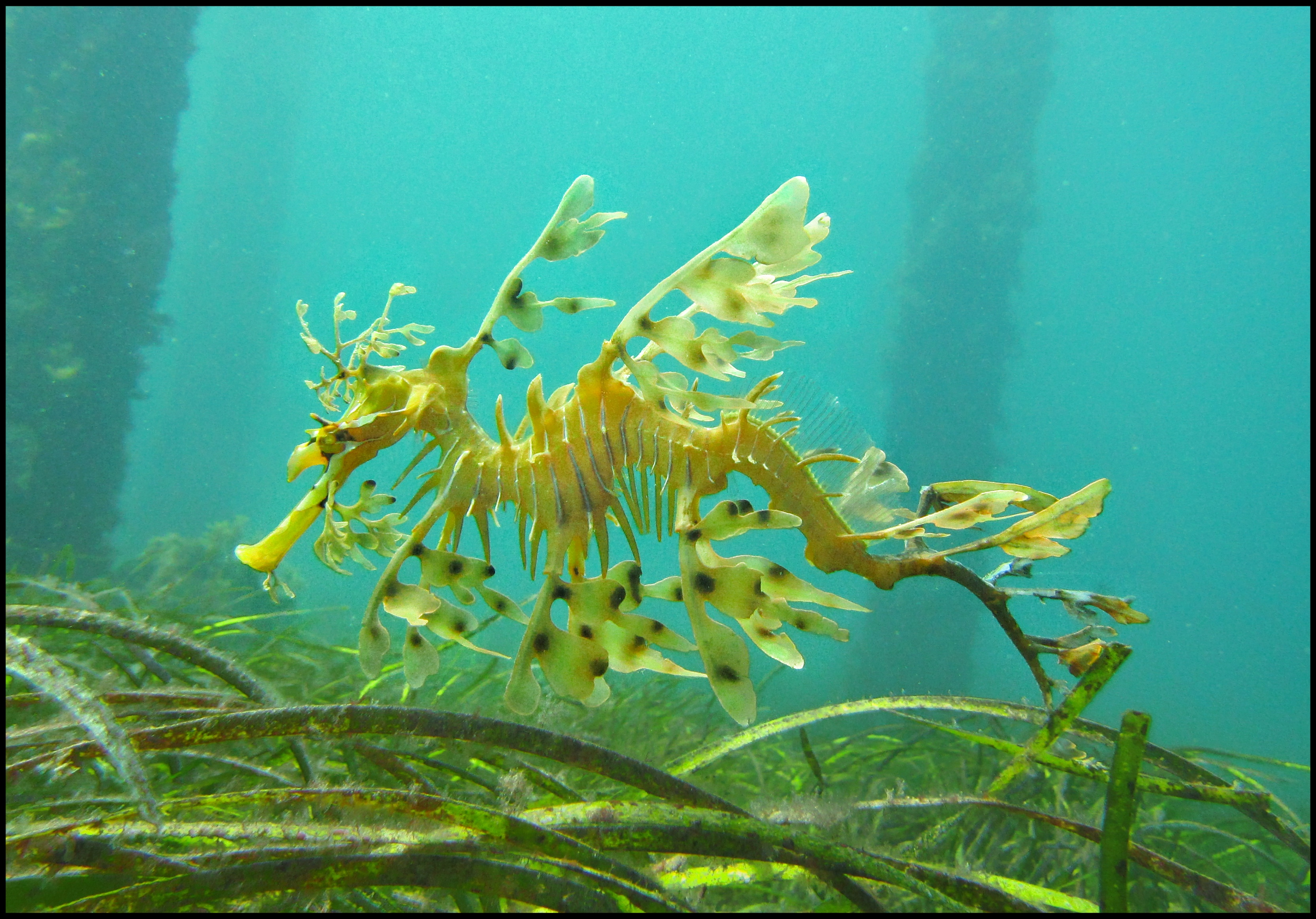
Leafy seadragon

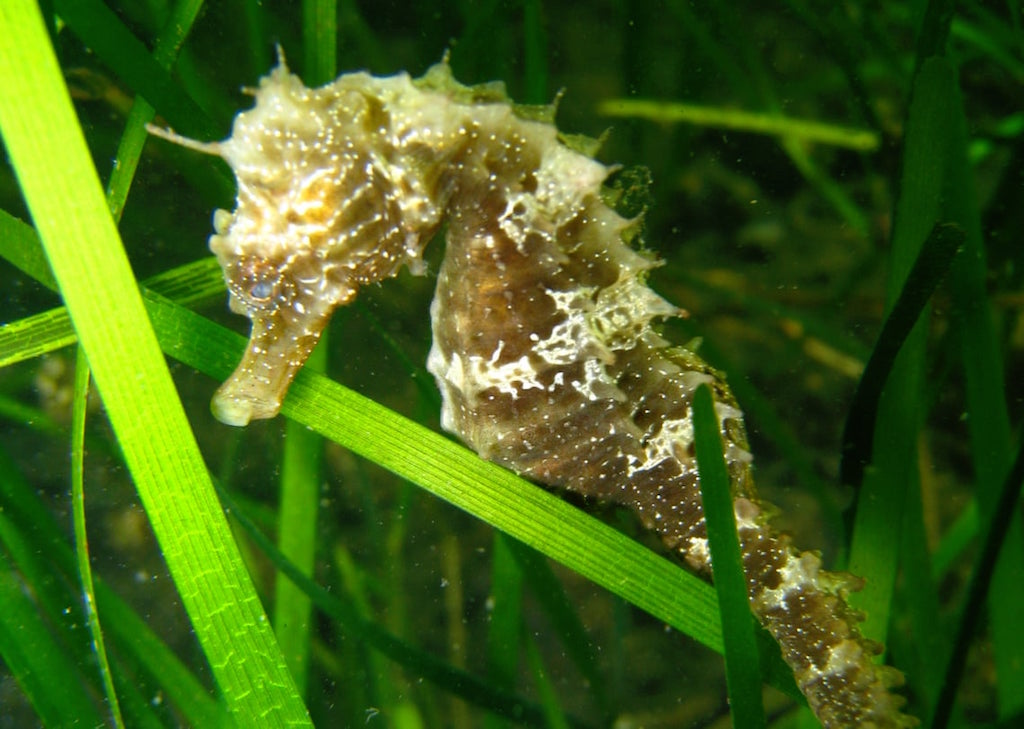
Seahorse

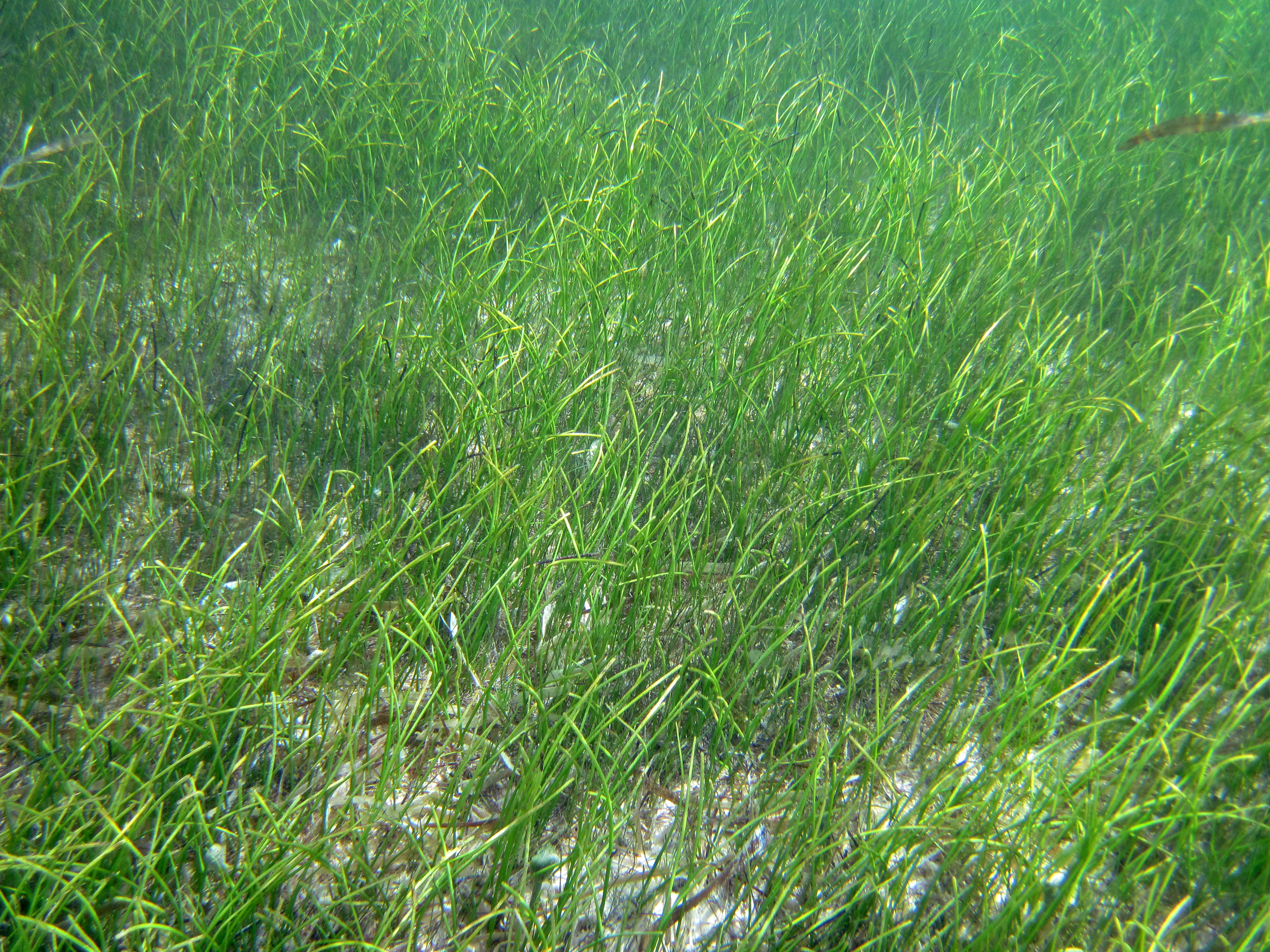
Manatee grass

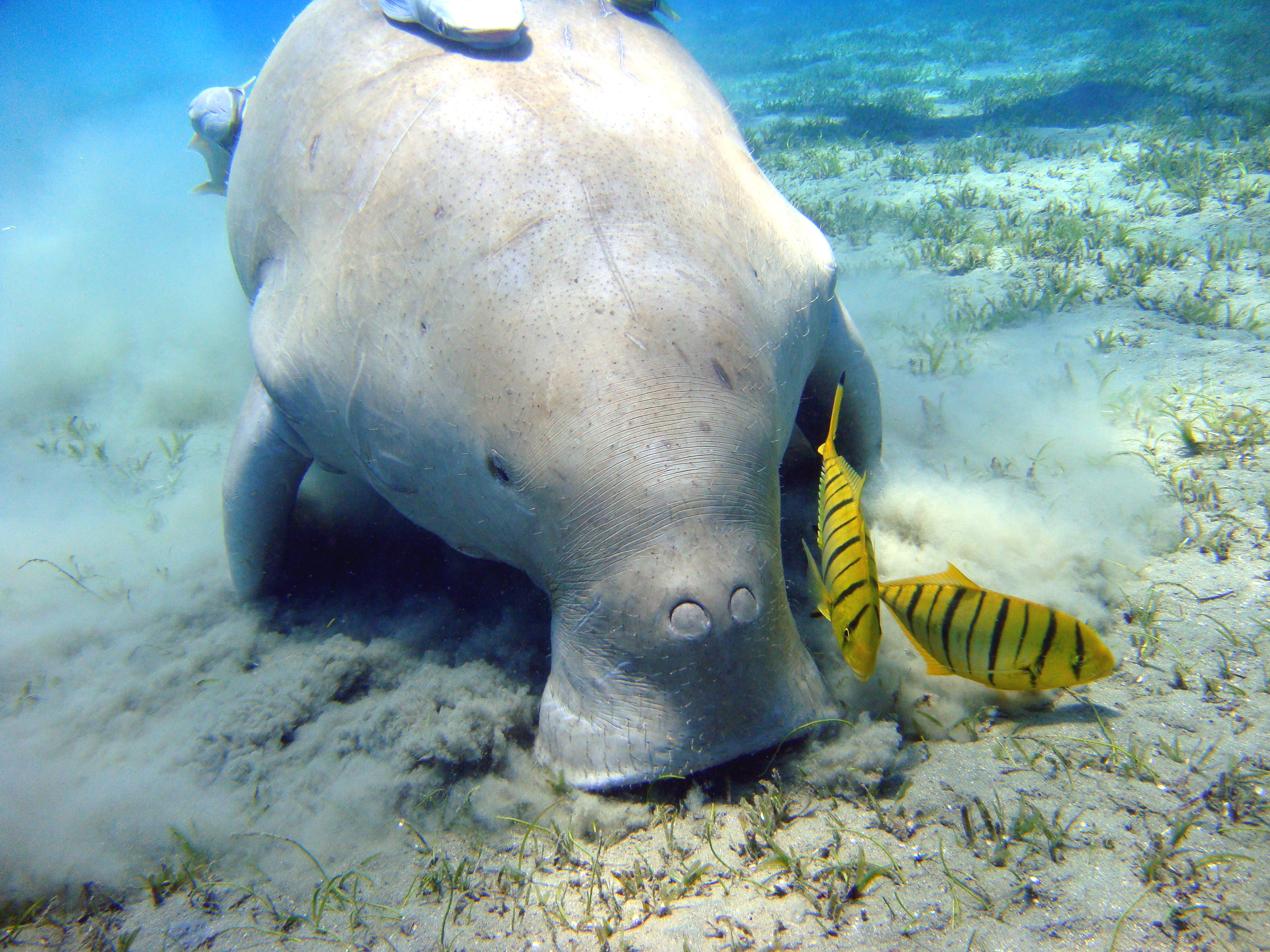
Manatee (sea cow)

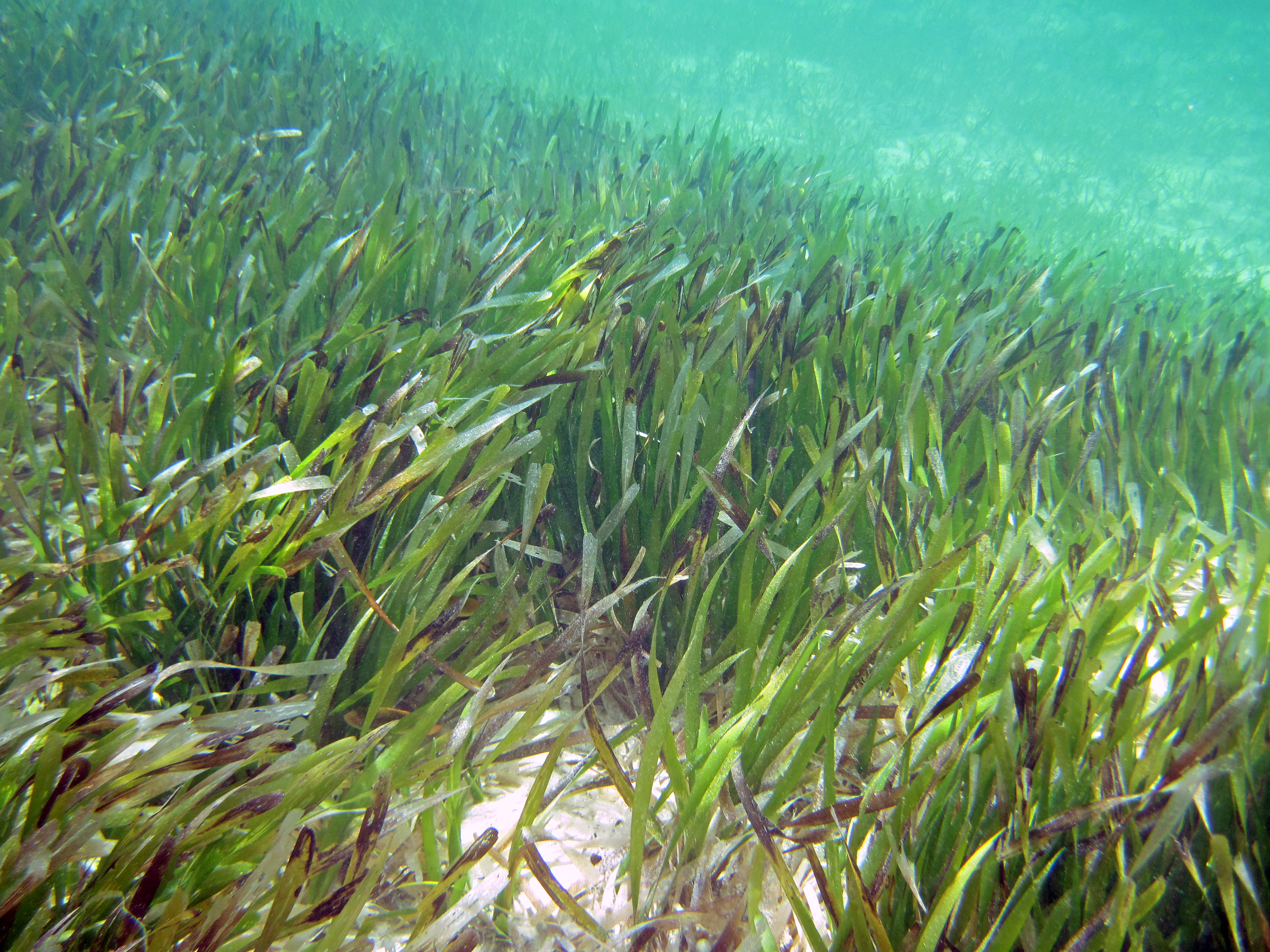
Turtle grass

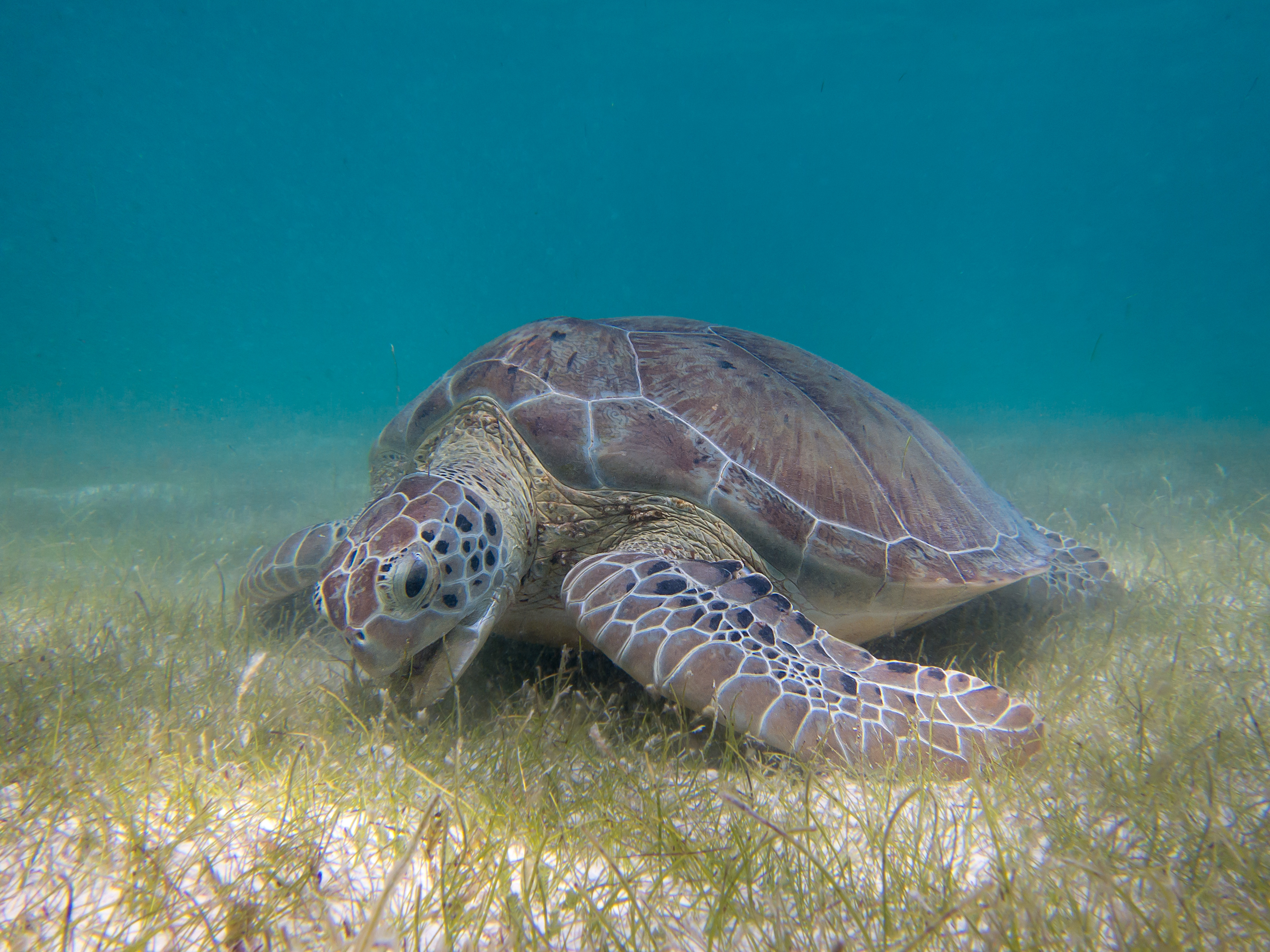
Green sea turtle grazing

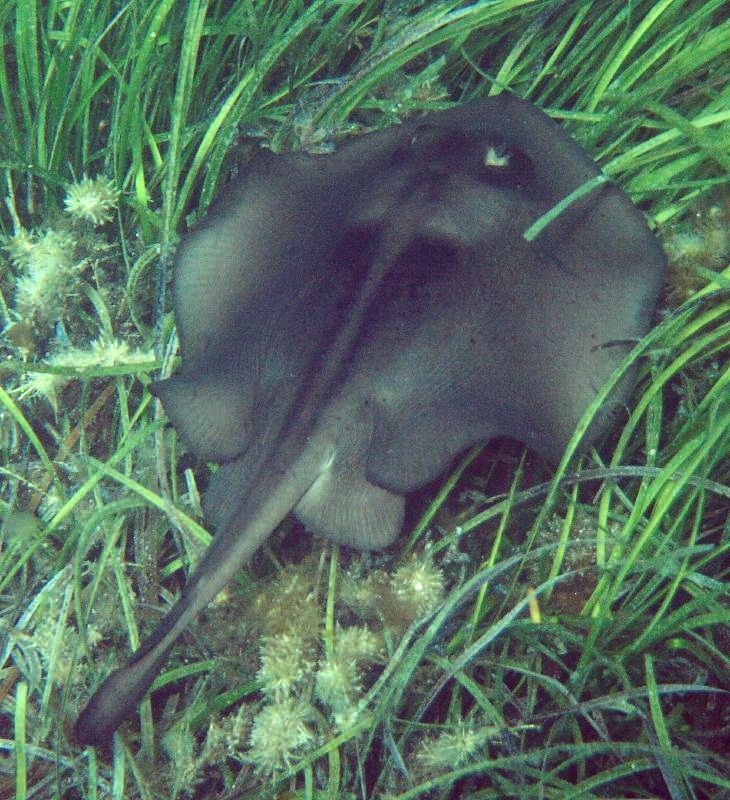
Stingray in seagrass

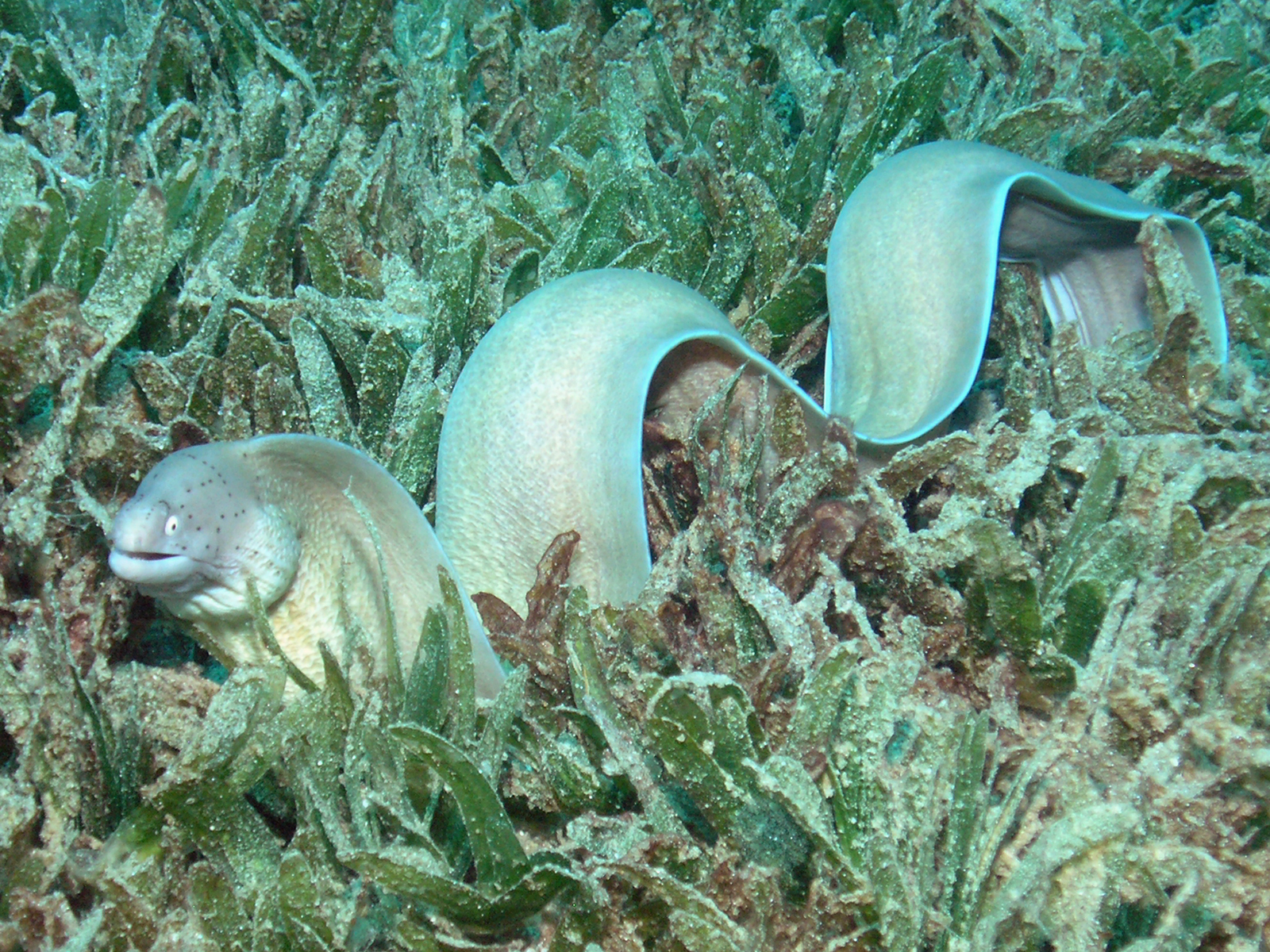
Peppered moray in seagrass

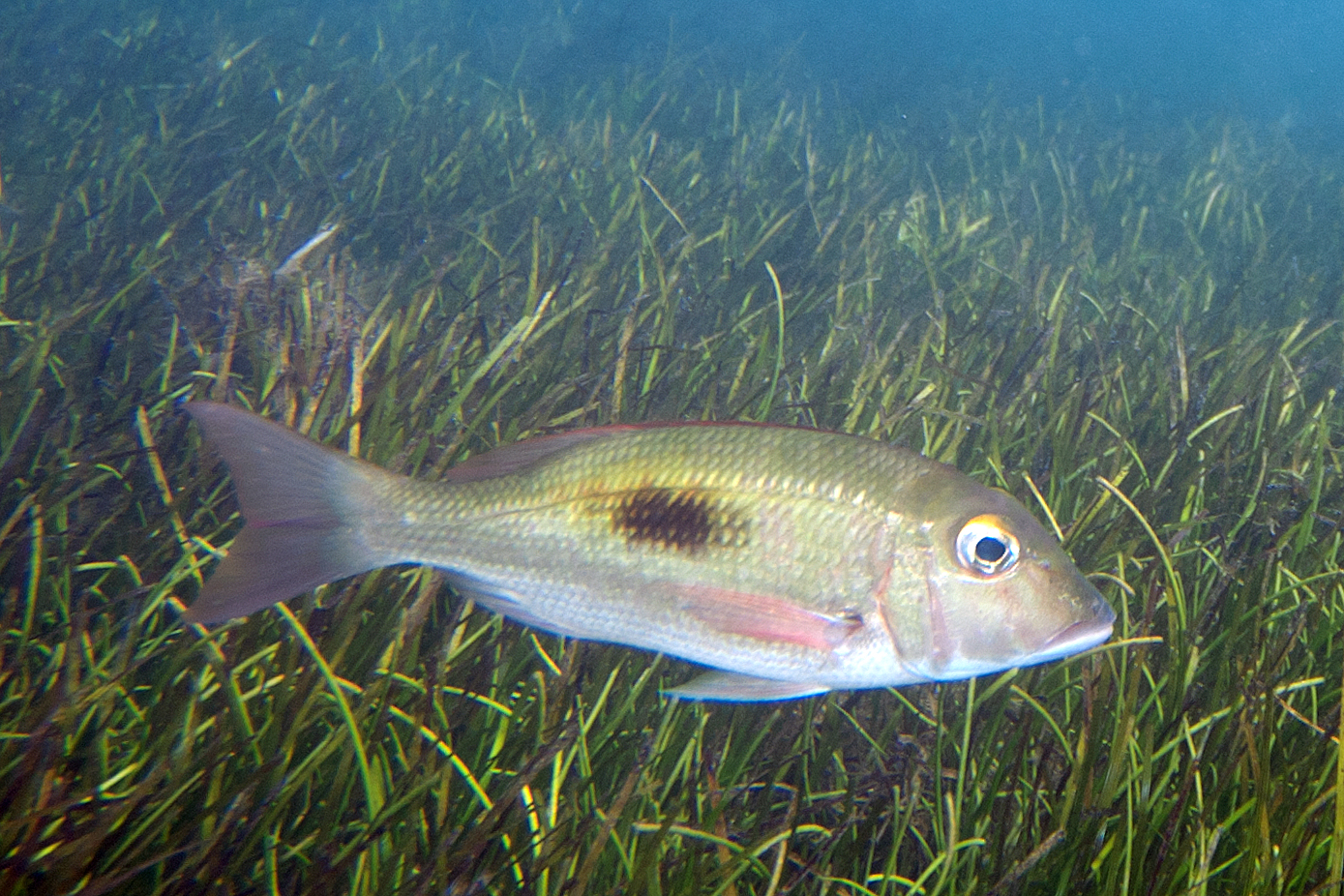
Blackspot emperor in seagrass

External videos
- Grazing sea turtle
- Grazing manatee

=== Other services ===
Historically, seagrasses were collected as fertilizer for sandy soil. This was an important use in the Aveiro Lagoon, Portugal, where the plants collected were known as moliço. In the early 20th century, in France and, to a lesser extent, the Channel Islands, dried seagrasses were used as a mattress (paillasse) filling – such mattresses were in high demand by French forces during World War I. It was also used for bandages and other purposes.

In February 2017, researchers found that seagrass meadows may be able to remove various pathogens from seawater. On small islands without wastewater treatment facilities in central Indonesia, levels of pathogenic marine bacteria – such as Enterococcus – that affect humans, fish and invertebrates were reduced by 50 percent when seagrass meadows were present, compared to paired sites without seagrass, although this could be a detriment to their survival.

== Movement ecology ==
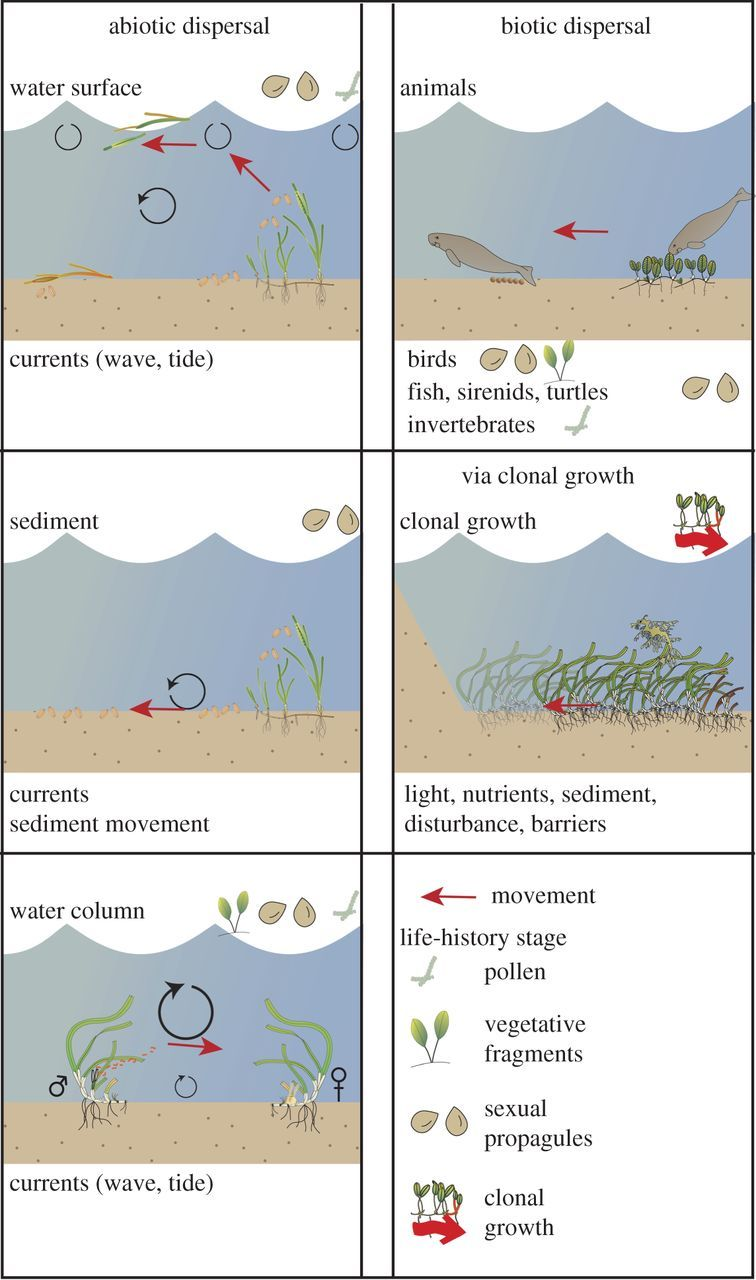
Five types of seagrass motion capacity Three influenced by abiotic vectors, one by biotic vectors and the final via clonal growth

Understanding the movement ecology of seagrasses provides a way to assess the capacity of populations to recover from impacts associated with existing and future pressures. These include the (re)-colonization of altered or fragmented landscapes, and movement associated with climate change.

The marine environment acts as an abiotic dispersal vector and its physical properties significantly influence movement, presenting both challenges and opportunities that differ from terrestrial environments. Typical flow speeds in the ocean are around 0.1 m s^{−1}, generally one to two orders of magnitude weaker than typical atmospheric flows (1–10 m s^{−1}), that can limit dispersal. However, as seawater density is approximately 1000 times greater than air, momentum of a moving mass of water at the same speed is three orders of magnitude greater than in air. Therefore, drag forces acting on individuals (proportional to density) are also three orders of magnitude higher, enabling relatively larger-sized propagules to be mobilized. But most importantly, buoyancy forces (proportional to the density difference between seawater and the propagule) significantly reduce the effective weight of submerged propagules. Within seagrasses, propagules can weakly settle (negatively buoyant), remain effectively suspended in the interior of the water column (neutrally buoyant), or float at the surface (positively buoyant).

With positive buoyancy (e.g. floating fruit), ocean surface currents freely move propagules, and dispersal distances are only limited by the viability time of the fruit, leading to exceptionally long single dispersal events (more than 100 km), which is rare for passive abiotic movement of terrestrial fruit and seeds.

There are a variety of biotic dispersal vectors for seagrasses, as they feed on or live in seagrass habitat. These include dugongs, manatees, turtles, waterfowl, fish and invertebrates. Each biotic vector has its own internal state, motion capacity, navigation capacity and external factors influencing its movement. These interact with plant movement ecology to determine the ultimate movement path of the plant.

For example, if a waterbird feeds on a seagrass containing fruit with seeds that are viable after defecation, then the bird has the potential to transport the seeds from one feeding ground to another. Therefore, the movement path of the bird determines the potential movement path of the seed. Particular traits of the animal, such as its digestive passage time, directly influence the plant's movement path.

== Biogeochemistry ==
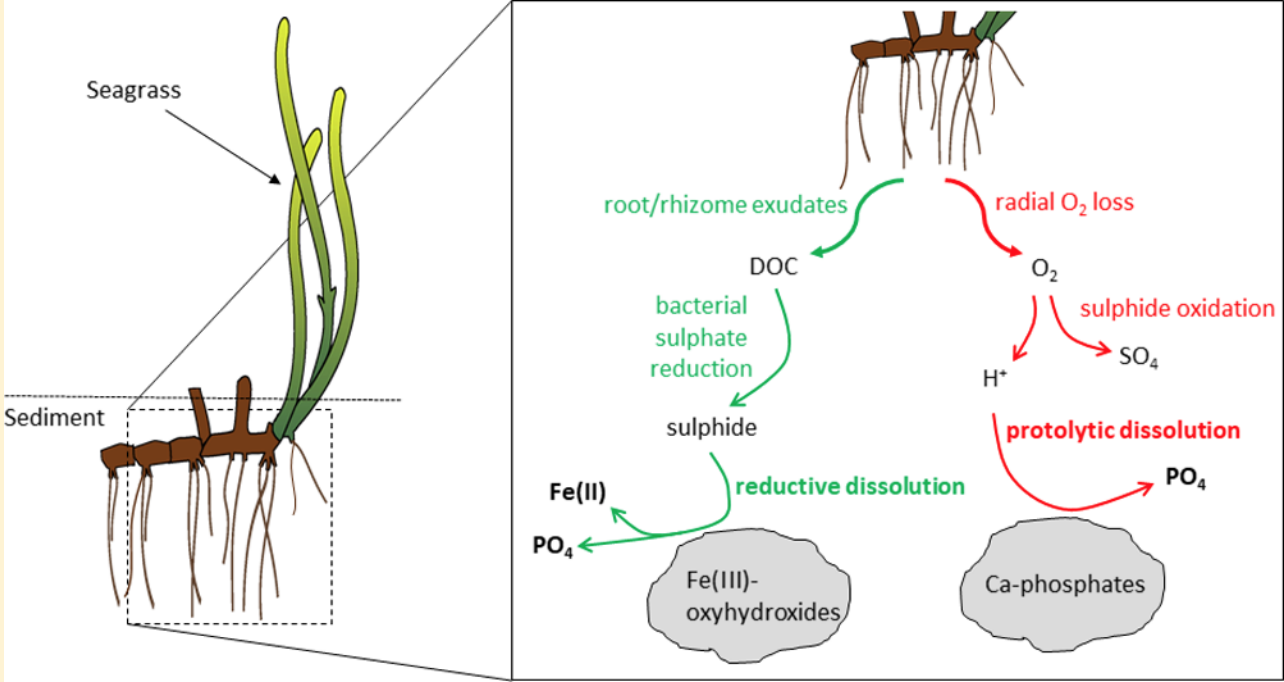
Why seagrasses are widely distributed in oligotrophic tropical waters It is to do with how tropical seagrasses mobilise phosphorus and iron. Tropical seagrasses are nutrient-limited owing to the strong phosphorus fixation capacity of carbonate-rich sediments, yet they form densely vegetated, multispecies meadows in oligotrophic tropical waters. Tropical seagrasses are able to mobilize the essential nutrients iron and phosphorus in their rhizosphere via multiple biogeochemical pathways. They can mobilise phosphorus and iron within their rhizosphere via plant-induced local acidification, leading to dissolution of carbonates and release of phosphate, and via local stimulation of microbial sulfide production. These mechanisms have a direct link to seagrass-derived radial oxygen loss and secretion of dissolved organic carbon from the below-ground tissue into the rhizosphere. This demonstration of seagrass-derived rhizospheric phosphorus and iron mobilization explains why seagrasses are widely distributed in oligotrophic tropical waters.

The primary nutrients determining seagrass growth are carbon (C), nitrogen (N), phosphorus (P), and light for photosynthesis. Nitrogen and phosphorus can be acquired from sediment pore water or from the water column, and sea grasses can uptake N in both ammonium (NH^{4+}) and nitrate (NO^{3−}) form.

A number of studies from around the world have found that there is a wide range in the concentrations of C, N, and P in seagrasses depending on their species and environmental factors. For instance, plants collected from high-nutrient environments had lower C:N and C:P ratios than plants collected from low-nutrient environments. Seagrass stoichiometry does not follow the Redfield ratio commonly used as an indicator of nutrient availability for phytoplankton growth. In fact, a number of studies from around the world have found that the proportion of C:N:P in seagrasses can vary significantly depending on their species, nutrient availability, or other environmental factors. Depending on environmental conditions, seagrasses can be either P-limited or N-limited.

An early study of seagrass stoichiometry suggested that the Redfield balanced ratio between N and P for seagrasses is approximately 30:1. However, N and P concentrations are strictly not correlated, suggesting that seagrasses can adapt their nutrient uptake based on what is available in the environment. For example, seagrasses from meadows fertilized with bird excrement have shown a higher proportion of phosphate than unfertilized meadows. Alternately, seagrasses in environments with higher loading rates and organic matter diagenesis supply more P, leading to N-limitation. P availability in Thalassia testudinum is the limiting nutrient. The nutrient distribution in Thalassia testudinum ranges from 29.4 to 43.3% C, 0.88-3.96% N, and 0.048-0.243% P. This equates to a mean ratio of 24.6 C:N, 937.4 C:P, and 40.2 N:P. This information can also be used to characterize the nutrient availability of a bay or other water body (which is difficult to measure directly) by sampling the seagrasses living there.

Light availability is another factor that can affect the nutrient stoichiometry of seagrasses. Nutrient limitation can only occur when photosynthetic energy causes grasses to grow faster than the influx of new nutrients. For example, low light environments tend to have a lower C:N ratio. Alternately, high-N environments can have an indirect negative effect to seagrass growth by promoting growth of algae that reduce the total amount of available light.

Nutrient variability in seagrasses can have potential implications for wastewater management in coastal environments. High amounts of anthropogenic nitrogen discharge could cause eutrophication in previously N-limited environments, leading to hypoxic conditions in the seagrass meadow and affecting the carrying capacity of that ecosystem.

A study of annual deposition of C, N, and P from Posidonia oceanica seagrass meadows in northeast Spain found that the meadow sequestered 198 g C m^{−2} yr^{−1}, 13.4 g N m^{−2} yr^{−1}, and 2.01 g P m^{−2} yr^{−1} into the sediment. Subsequent remineralization of carbon from the sediments due to respiration returned approximately 8% of the sequestered carbon, or 15.6 g C m^{−2} yr ^{−1}.

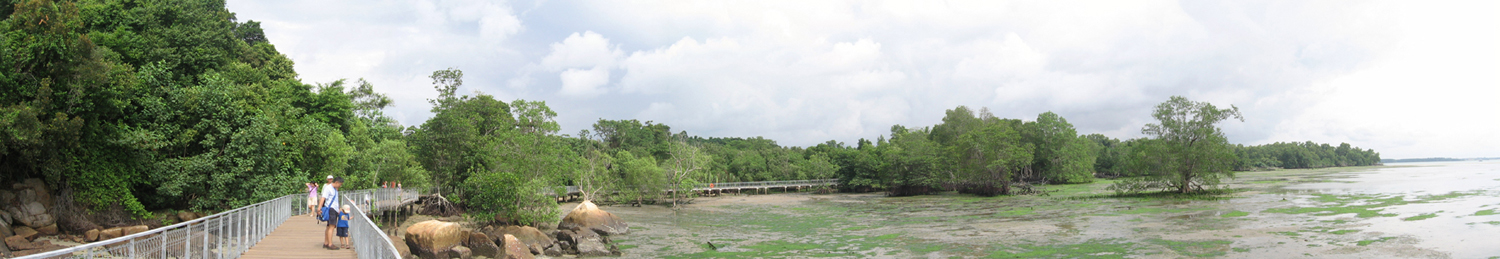
Seagrass lagoon, Chek Jawa, Singapore

== Threats ==
Seagrasses are in global decline, with some 30,000 km^{2} (12,000 sq mi) lost during recent decades. Seagrass loss has accelerated over the past few decades, from 0.9% per year prior to 1940 to 7% per year in 1990.

Natural disturbances, such as grazing, storms, ice-scouring and desiccation, are an inherent part of seagrass ecosystem dynamics. Seagrasses display a high degree of phenotypic plasticity, adapting rapidly to changing environmental conditions. Human activities, on the other hand, have caused significant disturbance and are accountable for the majority of the losses.

The seagrass can be damaged from direct mechanical destruction of habitat through fishing methods that rely on heavy nets that are dragged across the sea floor, putting this important ecosystem at serious risk. When humans drive motor boats over shallow seagrass areas, the propeller blade can also damage the seagrass.

Seagrass habitats are threatened by coastal eutrophication, which is caused by excessive input of nutrients (nitrogen, phosphorus). That excessive input is directly toxic to seagrasses, but most importantly, it stimulates the growth of epiphytic and free-floating macro- and micro-algae. Known as nuisance species, macroalgae grow in filamentous and sheet-like forms and form thick unattached mats over seagrass, occurring as epiphytes on seagrass leaves. Eutrophication leads to the forming of algal blooms, causing the attenuation of light in the water column, which eventually leads to anoxic conditions for the seagrass and organisms living in/around the plant(s). In addition to the direct blockage of light to the plant, benthic macroalgae have low carbon/nitrogen content, causing their decomposition to stimulate bacterial activity, leading to sediment resuspension, an increase in water turbidity, and further light attenuation. When the seagrass does not get enough sunlight, it reduces the photosynthesis that nourishes the seagrass and the primary production results, and then decaying seagrass leaves and algae fuel algal blooms even further, resulting in a positive feedback loop. This can cause the decline and eradication of seagrasses to algal dominance.

Accumulating evidence also suggests that overfishing of top predators (large predatory fish) could indirectly increase algal growth by reducing grazing control performed by mesograzers, such as crustaceans and gastropods, through a trophic cascade.

Increased seawater temperatures, increased sedimentation, and coastal development have also had a significant impact in the decline of seagrasses.

The most-used methods to protect and restore seagrass meadows include nutrient and pollution reduction, marine protected areas, and restoration using seagrass transplanting. Seagrass is not seen as resilient to the impacts of future environmental change.

=== Ocean deoxygenation ===
Globally, seagrass has been declining rapidly. Hypoxia that leads to eutrophication caused from ocean deoxygenation is one of the main underlying factors of these die-offs. Eutrophication causes enhanced nutrient enrichment which can result in seagrass productivity, but with continual nutrient enrichment in seagrass meadows, it can cause excessive growth of microalgae, epiphytes and phytoplankton resulting in hypoxic conditions.

Seagrass is both a source and a sink for oxygen in the surrounding water column and sediments. At night, the inner part of seagrass oxygen pressure is linearly related to the oxygen concentration in the water column, so low water column oxygen concentrations often result in hypoxic seagrass tissues, which can eventually kill off the seagrass. Normally, seagrass sediments must supply oxygen to the below-ground tissue through either photosynthesis or by diffusing oxygen from the water column through leaves to rhizomes and roots. However, with the change in seagrass oxygen balances, it can often result in hypoxic seagrass tissues. Seagrass exposed to this hypoxic water column show increased respiration, reduced rates of photosynthesis, smaller leaves, and reduced number of leaves per shoot. This causes insufficient supply of oxygen to the belowground tissues for aerobic respiration, so seagrass must rely on the less-efficient anaerobic respiration. Seagrass die-offs create a positive feedback loop in which the mortality events cause more death as higher oxygen demands are created when dead plant material decomposes.

Because hypoxia increases the invasion of sulfides in seagrass, this negatively affects seagrass through photosynthesis, metabolism and growth. Generally, seagrass is able to combat the sulfides by supplying enough oxygen to the roots. However, deoxygenation causes the seagrass to be unable to supply this oxygen, thus killing it off. Deoxygenation reduces the diversity of organisms inhabiting seagrass beds by eliminating species that cannot tolerate the low oxygen conditions. Indirectly, the loss and degradation of seagrass threatens numerous species that rely on seagrass for either shelter or food. The loss of seagrass also effects the physical characteristics and resilience of seagrass ecosystems. Seagrass beds provide nursery grounds and habitat to many harvested commercial, recreational, and subsistence fish and shellfish. In many tropical regions, local people are dependent on seagrass associated fisheries as a source of food and income.

=== Seagrass Wasting Disease ===
Seagrass Wasting Disease is (SWD) is a marine illness that affects eelgrass (Zostera marina), which is the most widely distributed of all seagrasses. It globally affects temperate and subtropical meadows across both the Atlantic and Pacific coasts of North America and Europe, extending from Alaska to California in the Pacific and throughout northern European coastal waters. SWD is caused by the pathogen Labyrinthula zosterae, which is a pathogenic species commonly known as marine slime mold. The pathogen invades healthy eelgrass leaf tissue, impairs photosynthesis, and causes enzymatic degradation of eelgrass cells. Symptoms of SWD on eelgrass include blackened or brown spots, streaks, and or patches on eelgrass leaves. Transmission of marine slime mold occurs through direct contact with diseased floating blades or waterborne transmission. A highly infectious transmission method, waterborne transmission allows for marine slime mold to increase its genetic diversity and spread rapidly and widely across the water column, with only 6 cells of marine slime mold per mL of water needed to infect an eelgrass shoot. SWD infection severity directly impairs eelgrass productivity, as rapidly expanding lesions outpace healthy leaf growth and significantly reduce overall blade elongation. Furthermore, infection limits below-ground non-structural carbon storage essential for long-term shoot survival and meadow resilience.

Research has shown that warming sea surface temperatures fuel summer wasting disease outbreaks. One study found that that warmer sea surface temperatures fueled summer epidemics of eelgrass wasting disease during and after the 2015–2016 northeast Pacific marine heatwave, with disease prevalence rising from 5–70% in 2013 to 60–90% by 2017 and severity roughly doubling each year from 2015 to 2017. Over the same period, eelgrass shoot density declined by 60%. SWD outbreaks exacerbate the broader global decline of 2% to 7% per year; therefore, management and restoration strategies should consider resiliency to the disease. Low or absent wasting disease can serve as a practical signal of climate-resilient refugia, helping managers prioritize eelgrass meadows that are more likely to persist under warming and pathogen pressure. Even in stressed or declining habitats, disease monitoring can still reveal especially resilient plants or meadows that are good candidates for restoration and long-term protection.

=== Diminishing meadows ===
The storage of carbon is an essential ecosystem service as we move into a period of elevated atmospheric carbon levels. However, some climate change models suggest that some seagrasses will go extinct – Posidonia oceanica is expected to go extinct, or nearly so, by 2050.

The UNESCO World Heritage Site around the Balearic islands of Mallorca and Formentera includes about 55,000 hectares (140,000 acres) of Posidonia oceanica, which has global significance because of the amount of carbon dioxide it absorbs. However, the meadows are being threatened by rising temperatures, which slows down its growth, as well as damage from anchors.

== Restoration ==
=== Using propagules ===
Seagrass propagules are materials that help propagate seagrass. Seagrasses pollinate by hydrophily, that is, by dispersing in the water. Sexually and asexually produced propagules are important for this dispersal.

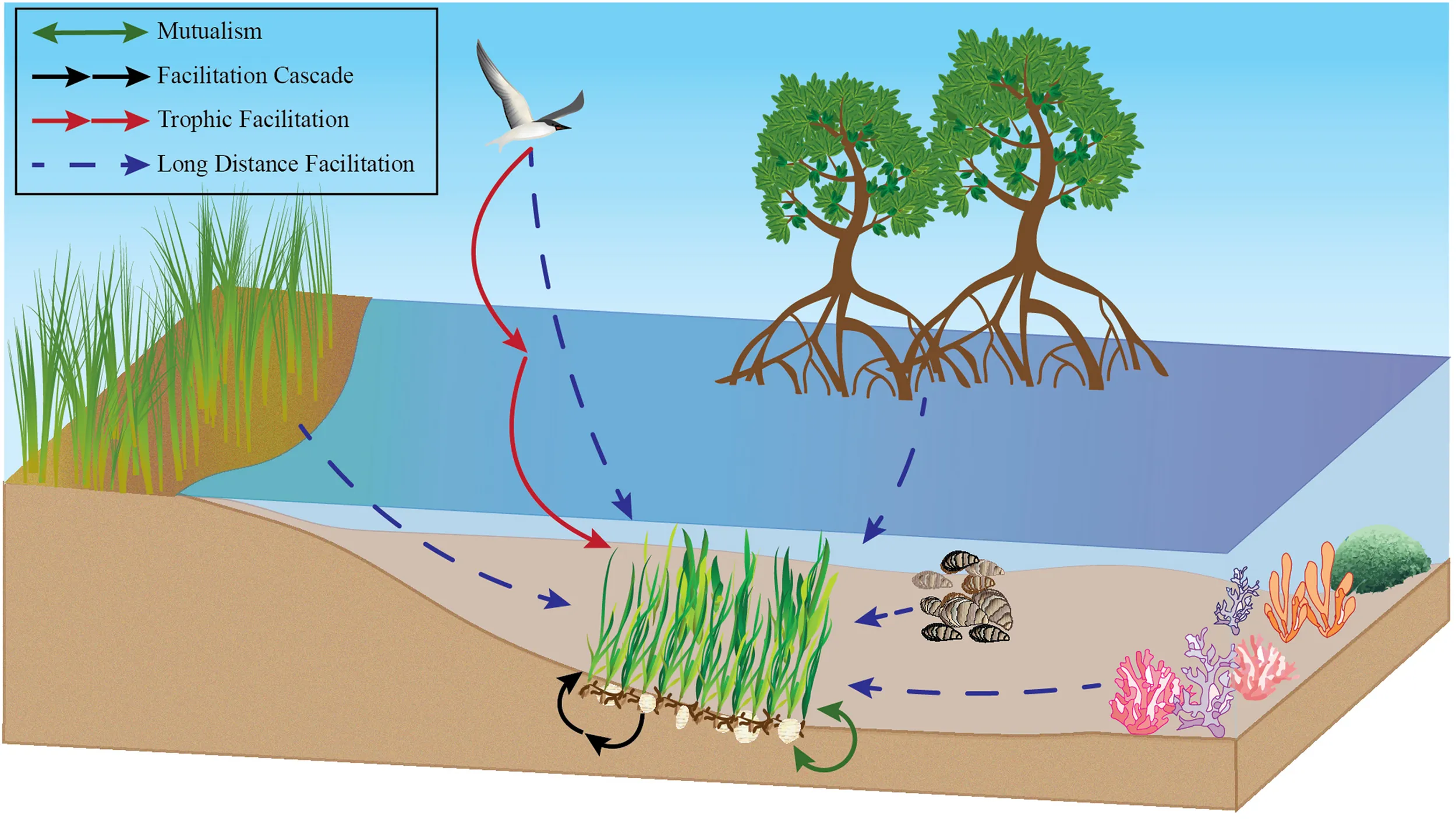
Positive interactions impacting seagrass. This includes but is not limited to long distance facilitation with corals, oysters, mangroves, seabirds, and salt marshes, mutualisms between seagrass and lucinid clams, and facilitation cascades of bivalves in seagrasses as examples.

Species from the genera Amphibolis and Thalassodendron produce viviparous seedlings. Most others produce seeds, although their characteristics vary widely; some species produce seeds or fruit that are positively buoyant and have potential for long-distance dispersal (e.g., Enhalus, Posidonia, and Thalassia). Others produce seeds that are negatively buoyant with limited dispersal potential (e.g., Zostera and Halophila). although long-distance dispersal can still occur via transport of detached fragments carrying spathes (modified leaves which enclose the flower cluster); e.g., Zostera spp. Nearly all species are also capable of asexual reproduction through rhizome elongation or the production of asexual fragments (e.g., rhizome fragments, pseudoviviparous plantlets). Sexually derived propagules of some species lack the ability to be dormant (e.g., Amphibolis and Posidonia), while others can remain dormant for long periods. These differences in biology and ecology of propagules strongly influence patterns of recruitment and dispersal, and the way they can be used effectively in restoration.

Seagrass restoration has primarily involved using asexual material (e.g., cuttings, rhizome fragments or cores) collected from donor meadows. Relatively few seagrass restoration efforts have used sexually derived propagules. The infrequent use of sexually derived propagules is probably in part due to the temporal and spatial variability of seed availability, as well as the perception that survival rates of seeds and seedlings are poor. Although survival rates are often low, recent reviews of seed-based research highlight that this is probably because of limited knowledge about availability and collection of quality seed, skills in seed handling and delivery, and suitability of restoration sites.

Methods for collecting and preparing propagules vary according to their characteristics and typically harness their natural dispersal mechanisms. For example, for viviparous taxa such as Amphibolis, recently detached seedlings can be collected by placing fibrous and weighted material, such as sand-filled hessian bags, which the seedlings' grappling structures attach to as they drift past. In this way thousands of seedlings can be captured in less than a square meter. Typically, sandbags are deployed in locations where restoration is required, and are not collected and re-deployed elsewhere.

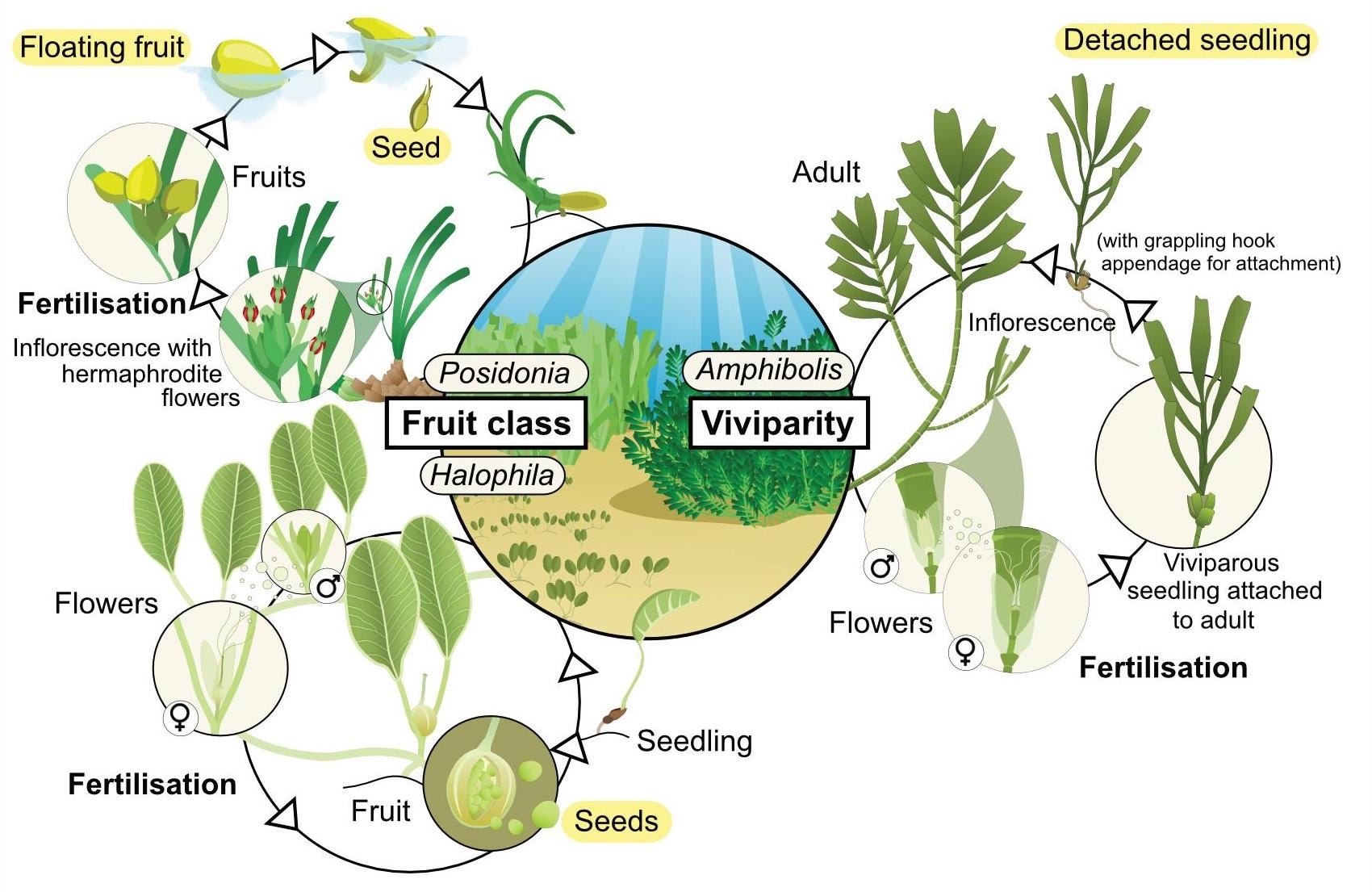
Life history of the main habitat-forming taxa in seagrass meadows

For species which have seeds contained within spathes (e.g., Zostera spp.), these can be harvested using divers or mechanical harvesters. In Chesapeake Bay several million Zostera marina seeds have been collected each year during the peak reproductive season using a mechanical harvester. Seeds are extracted from spathes after harvesting, but the methods of extraction and delivery vary. For example, some methods involve keeping the spathes within large holding tanks where they eventually split open and release the (negatively buoyant) seeds, which are then collected from the tank bottom. The seeds are then placed in a flume to determine seed quality based on settling velocity, after which they are scattered by hand from boats over recipient habitats. Alternatively, using buoys anchored in place, Z. marina spathes can be suspended over restoration sites in mesh bags; the spathes release and deliver the seeds to the seafloor.

For species that release seeds from fruits that float (Posidonia spp., Halophila spp.), fruits can be detached from the parent plant by shaking; they then float to the surface where they are collected in nets. Seeds are then extracted from the fruit via vigorous aeration and water movement from pumps at stable temperatures (25 °C) within tanks. The negatively buoyant seeds are then collected from the tank bottom and scattered by-hand over recipient habitats. Other methods have been trialed with limited success, including direct planting of seeds by hand, injecting seeds using machinery, or planting and deploying within hessian sandbags.

Restoration using seagrass propagules has so far demonstrated low and variable outcomes, with more than 90% of propagules failing to survive. Field experiments have shown that seed-based restoration outcomes can be affected by seed delivery method, seed losses, and local environmental conditions. For propagules to be successfully incorporated within seagrass restoration programs, there will need to be a reduction in propagule wastage (which includes mortality, but also failure to germinate or dispersal away from the restoration site), to facilitate higher rates of germination and survival. A major barrier to effective use of seeds in seagrass restoration is knowledge about seed quality. Seed quality includes aspects such as viability, size (which can confer energy reserves available for initial growth and establishment), damage to the seed coat or seedling, bacterial infection, genetic diversity and ecotype (which may influence a seeds ability to respond to the restoration environment). Nevertheless, the diversity of propagules and species used in restoration is increasing and understanding of seagrass seed biology and ecology is advancing. To improve chances of propagule establishment, better understanding is needed about the steps that precede seed delivery to restoration sites, including seed quality, as well as the environmental and social barriers that influence survival and growth.

=== Other efforts ===
In various locations, communities are attempting to restore seagrass beds that were lost to human action, including in the US states of Virginia, Florida and Hawaii, as well as the United Kingdom. Such reintroductions have been shown to improve ecosystem services.

Dr. Fred Short of the University of New Hampshire developed a specialized transplant methodology known as "Transplanting Eelgrass Remotely with Frames" (TERF). This method involves using clusters of plants which are temporarily tied with degradable crepe paper unto a weighted frame of wire mesh. The method has already been tried out by Save The Bay.

In 2001, Steve Granger, from the University of Rhode Island Graduate School of Oceanography used a boat-pulled sled that is able to deposit seeds below the sediment surface. Together with colleague Mike Traber (who developed a Knox gelatin matrix to encase the seeds in), they conducted a test planting at Narragansett Bay. They were able to plant a 400 m^{2} (480 sq yd) area in less than two hours.

As of 2019 the Coastal Marine Ecosystems Research Centre of Central Queensland University has been growing seagrass for six years and has been producing seagrass seeds. They have been running trials in germination and sowing techniques.
