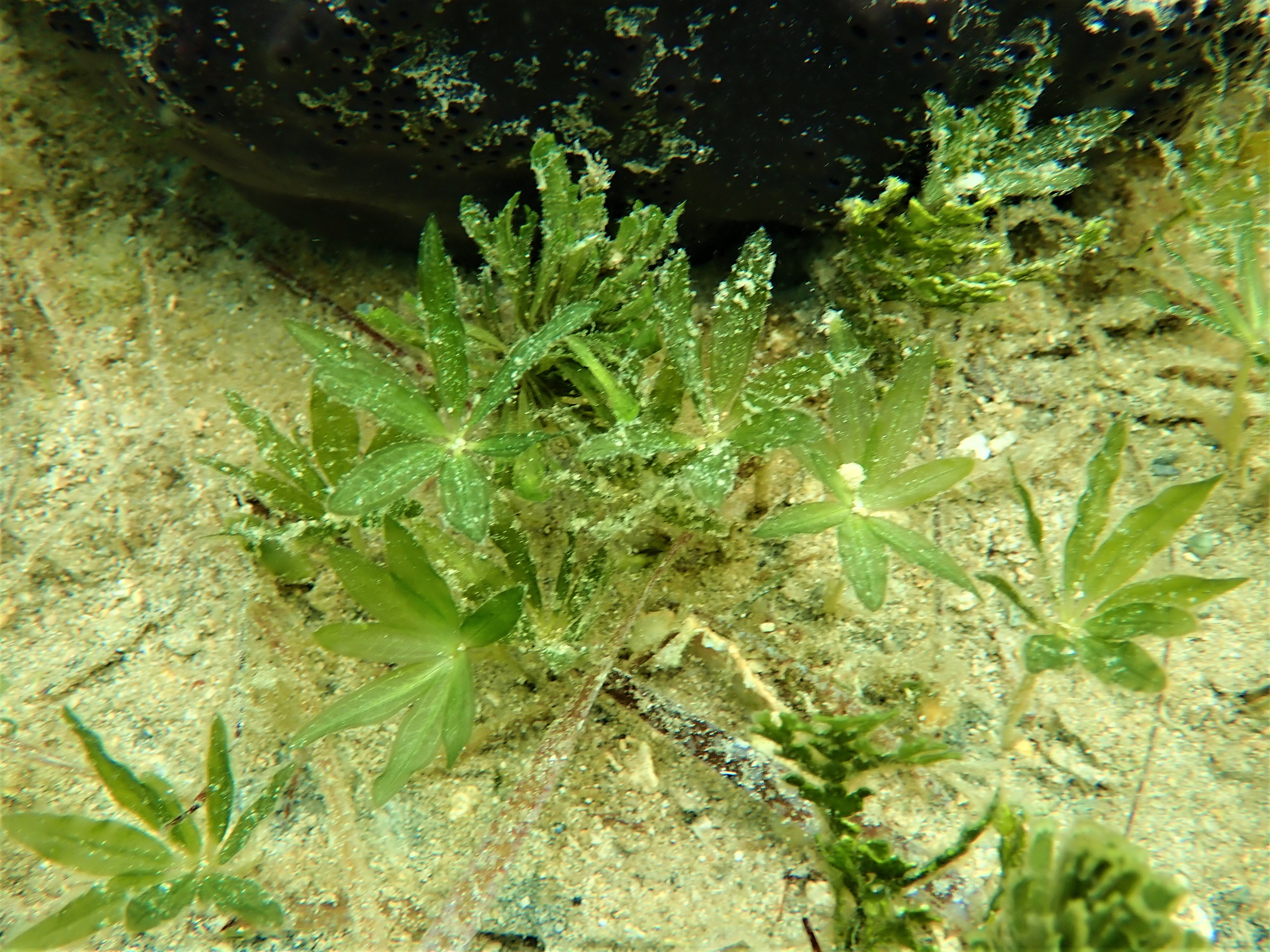

Conservation status
- Apparently Secure (NatureServe)

Scientific classification
- Kingdom: Plantae
- Clade: Tracheophytes
- Clade: Angiosperms
- Clade: Monocots
- Order: Alismatales
- Family: Hydrocharitaceae
- Genus: Halophila
- Species: H. engelmannii

Binomial name
- Halophila engelmannii Asch., 1875

= Halophila engelmannii =

Species of aquatic plant

Halophila engelmannii is a species of seagrass in the Hydrocharitaceae family. It is referred to by the common names star grass and Engelmann's seagrass and grows underwater on shallow sandy or muddy sea floors. It is native to the Bahamas, the Cayman Islands, Costa Rica, Cuba, the Gulf Coast of the United States, the Gulf Coast of Mexico, Puerto Rico, and Trinidad and Tobago.

== Description ==
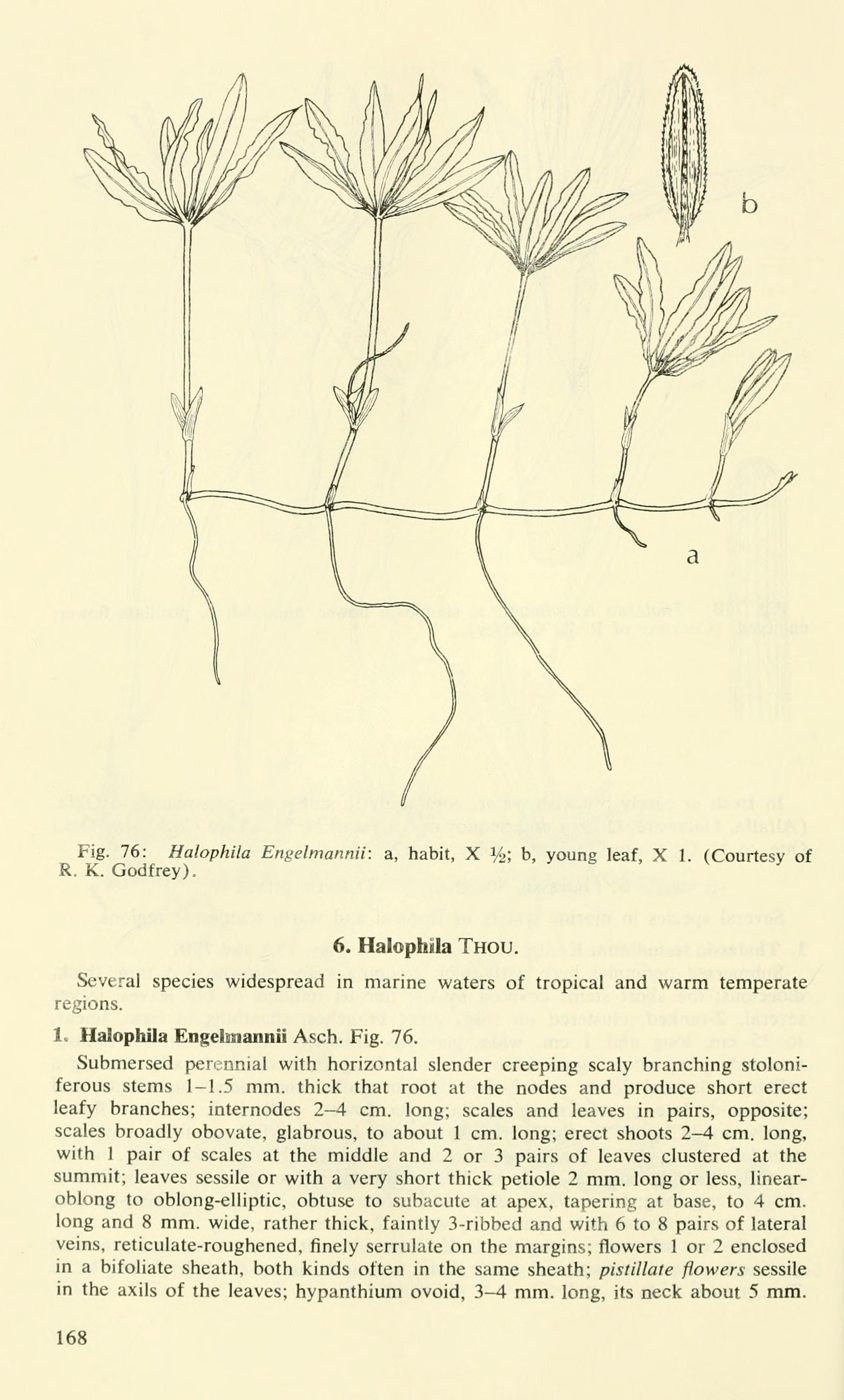
Botanical illustration of Halophila engelmannii

Halophila is the only genus of seagrass lacking basal sheaths on the leaf stems. Like other seagrasses, Halophila engelmannii has rhizomes that run along near the surface of sand or mud, with roots at the nodes to anchor them in place. Each leaf stem grows from a node and has a pair of scales halfway up and another pair at the base of the leaf blades. There are 4 to 8 blades on each stem, each of which is up to 30 millimetres (1.2 in) long and 6 millimetres (0.24 in) wide. Each blade is oval, has 6 to 8 veins and a finely serrated margin.

== Distribution ==
Halophila engelmannii is found on the coasts of Florida, Texas, the Bahamas, Cuba and the West Indies. It can grow in deeper waters than do some other species of seagrass, at depths down to 14.4 metres (47 ft). It is one of three species of Halophila found in the Indian River Lagoon, Florida, the others being Halophila decipiens and Halophila ovalis in the form of Johnson's seagrass. They often form mixed seagrass meadows at greater depths than other seagrasses normally grow.

== Biology ==
Flowering occurs in the early summer when the water temperature reaches at least 22 °C (72 °F). Fragments of the plant that become detached are able to grow into new plants. The seagrass meadow acts as habitat and food source for many invertebrates and fish. In the Indian River Lagoon, animals that feed on Halophila engelmannii include sea turtles, sea urchins, parrotfish, surgeonfish and possibly pinfish. The sea slug Elysia serca preferentially feeds on it by sucking sap.
