= Lampi (disambiguation) =

Lampi is a municipality on Crete, Greece.

Lampi may also refer to:

- Lampi (surname)
- Lampius, a 4th-century bishop of Barcelona
- Lanbi Kyun, also known as Lampi Island, Mergui Archipelago, Myanmar
  - Lampi Island Marine National Park, Myanmar
  - Lampi Kyun Wildlife Reserve, Myanmar
- Langpih, also spelled Lampi or Lumpi, a village in northeast India
