= Lampi Island Marine National Park =

Marine national park in Myanmar

- IUCN category II (national park)
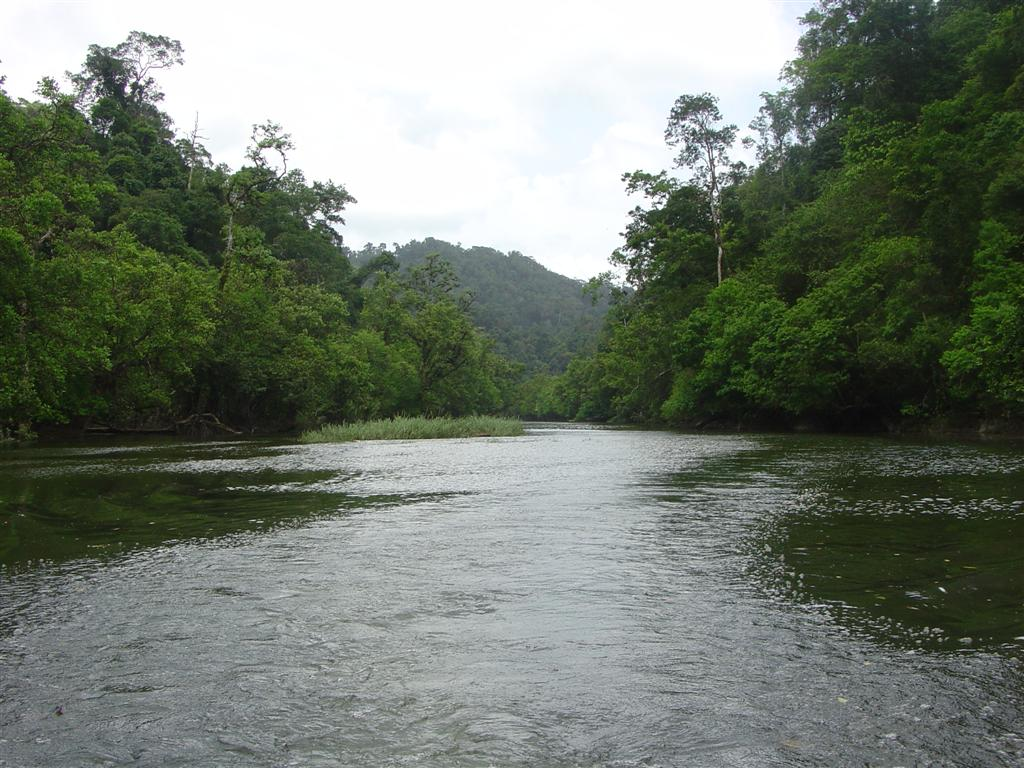
- Riverine habitat in Lanbi Island

- Location within Myanmar
- Location: Bokpyin Township, Tanintharyi Region, Myanmar
- Nearest city: Tanintharyi Township
- Coordinates: 10°50′00″N 98°12′00″E
- Area: 79.09 mi^{2} (204.8 km^{2})
- Established: 1996
- Governing body: Myanmar Nature and Wildlife Conservation Division
- Website: www.lampipark.org

The Lampi Island Marine National Park is a marine national park in Myanmar covering 79.09 mi^{2} (204.8 km^{2}). It was established in 1996. It encompasses Lanbi Island and several smaller islands in the Mergui Archipelago, comprising coral reefs, seagrass beds, mangroves, sand dunes and tropical evergreen forest up to an elevation of 1,493 ft (455 m). The national park is an Important Bird Area and one of the ASEAN Heritage Parks. The characteristics of the Marine National Park are the tropical evergreen rainforest, the vast coral reef systems that protect a wide range of aquatic ecosystems, and significant biodiversity in this area. Access is restricted to daytime visits.

== Geography ==
Lampi Island Marine National Park is generally flat, rising steeply from the sea level to 270 m (890 ft) and includes a few beaches and sand-covered inlets. There are vast caves and many freshwater sources in the park.

== Flora ==
Lampi Island Marine National Park is home to mangrove forests growing along rivers and fresh water sources. Coral reefs provide habitat to a variety of marine organisms. Lowland forests harbour Dipterocarpus alatus, epiphytes including lianas, stands of Casuarina equisetifolia, Dillenia and Calophyllum, wild orchids and ferns. In addition, 17 endangered trees were discovered, 50 mangrove species, 6 types of seagrasses, and 60 different species of corals. Seagrass present around the eastern part of the island comprises Thalassianthus hemprichi, Cymodocea rotundata, Halodule uninervis, H. pinifolia and dugong grass (Halophila ovalis).

== Fauna ==
The presence of dugong (Dugong dugon) on Lampi island was confirmed for the first time in March 2008. Since then, trails left by dugong to dugong grass patches were observed repeatedly. During a survey in 2013, carapaces of leatherback sea turtle (Dermochelys coriacea), green sea turtle (Chelonia mydas), hawksbill sea turtle (Eretmochelys imbricata) and Oldham’s leaf turtle (Cyclemys oldhamii) were found on Lampi Island. Pope’s tree pitviper (Trimeresurus popeiorum), water monitor (Varanus salvator) and Tokay gecko (Gekko gecko) were observed. Reticulated python (Python reticulatus) occurs as well.

A camera trapping survey between November 2015 and May 2017 revealed the presence of smooth-coated otter (Lutrogale perspicillata), Asian palm civet (Paradoxurus hermaphroditus), small-toothed palm civet (Arctogalidia trivirgata), long-tailed macaque (Macaca fascicularis), northern pig-tailed macaque (M. leonina), dusky langur (Trachypithecus obscurus), Bengal slow loris (Nycticebus bengalensis), lesser mouse deer (Tragulus kanchil lampensis), wild boar (Sus scrofa), Sunda pangolin (Manis javanica), northern treeshrew (Tupaia belangeri), red giant flying squirrel (Petaurista petaurista), black giant squirrel (Ratufa bicolour), grey-bellied squirrel (Callosciurus caniceps), Pallas's squirrel (C. erythraeus), Berdmore's ground squirrel (Menetes berdmorei), long-tailed giant rat (Leopoldamys sabanus) and red spiny rat (Maxomys surifer).

Bird species observed include Nicobar pigeon (Caloenas nicobarica) and Edible-nest swiftlet (Callocalia fuciphaga).

== Threats to wildlife ==
The primary hazards facing sea turtles in Lampi include habitat deterioration and fishing gear as well as direct removal of the turtles from their natural habitats by fishermen and locals for their consumption and commercial gain. The main source of income in the area is fishing, but hunting appears to be very profitable. This is especially true for individuals who travel from outside the island to hunt and sell mouse deer, pangolins, wild pigs, and common water monitors to fishing boats or to inland markets. Locals, on the other hand, typically hunt primarily for subsistence purposes.
