= Halophila baillonis =

Conservation status
- Vulnerable (IUCN 3.1)

Scientific classification
- Kingdom: Plantae
- Clade: Embryophytes
- Clade: Tracheophytes
- Clade: Spermatophytes
- Clade: Angiosperms
- Clade: Monocots
- Order: Alismatales
- Family: Hydrocharitaceae
- Genus: Halophila
- Species: H. baillonis

Binomial name
- Halophila baillonis Asch. ex Dickie

Synonyms
- Halophila aschersonii Ostenf. Serpicula quadrifolia Balb. ex Asch.

Species of aquatic plant

Halophila baillonis is a species of aquatic plant in the family Hydrocharitaceae. It is referred to by the common name clover grass. It is native to Brazil, Cayman Islands, Colombia, Costa Rica, Jamaica, Leeward Islands, Netherlands Antilles, Panama, Puerto Rico, Trinidad and Tobago, and Venezuela. It is listed on the IUCN Red List as "vulnerable" due to its naturally rare occurrence and fragmented populations.

== Description ==
This seagrass has fragile rhizomes with a single stem and a single root at each node. The shoots are erect and up to 24 mm (1 in) long, each with two obovate, keeled, scales in the central portion and a pseudo-whirl of four leaves at the tip. The leaf-blades are oblong to lanceolate, 7 to 12 mm (0.28 to 0.47 in) long by 3 to 4 mm (0.12 to 0.16 in) wide, with pronounced midribs and fine marginal serrations. There may be as many as 2,500 shoots per square metre.

== Distribution and habitat ==
Clover grass is native to the Caribbean area. It is known from several sites in the Greater Antilles, Lesser Antilles, Colombia, Venezuela and Belize, but its distribution is very patchy. It was previously known from Guanacaste Province on the Pacific coast of Costa Rica, but has not been seen there since a severe storm in 1996 and is not known from elsewhere in the Pacific. It grows on sandy or muddy bottoms and its depth range is down to about 15 m (50 ft). In 2015 it was found on the coast of Brazil in the state of Paraíba on a sheltered bar at the mouth of the Mamanguape River.

== Ecology ==
Where it is plentiful, as in Belize, it is sometimes found growing among the prop roots of mangroves, intermingled with Thalassia testudinum, Halophila decipiens, Halodule wrightii and Caulerpa spp.. It provides food for the West Indian manatee and concealment for young nurse sharks. The scorched mussel lives in the seagrass meadows and fish such as the flag-fin mojarra and the permit feed on the mussels and consume the seagrass while doing so.

== Status ==
This is a rare species of sea grass with a very fragmented distribution. Its greatest abundance is in the Placencia Lagoon in Belize, where it grows in dense monospecific stands. In several places, such as in Colombia and Puerto Rico, its presence has been confirmed in the past but it has not been found recently. Its total population seems to be in decline; its total area of occupancy is about 2,000 km^{2} (770 mi^{2}) and it is known from about seven locations. For these reasons, the International Union for Conservation of Nature has assessed its conservation status as being "vulnerable".
