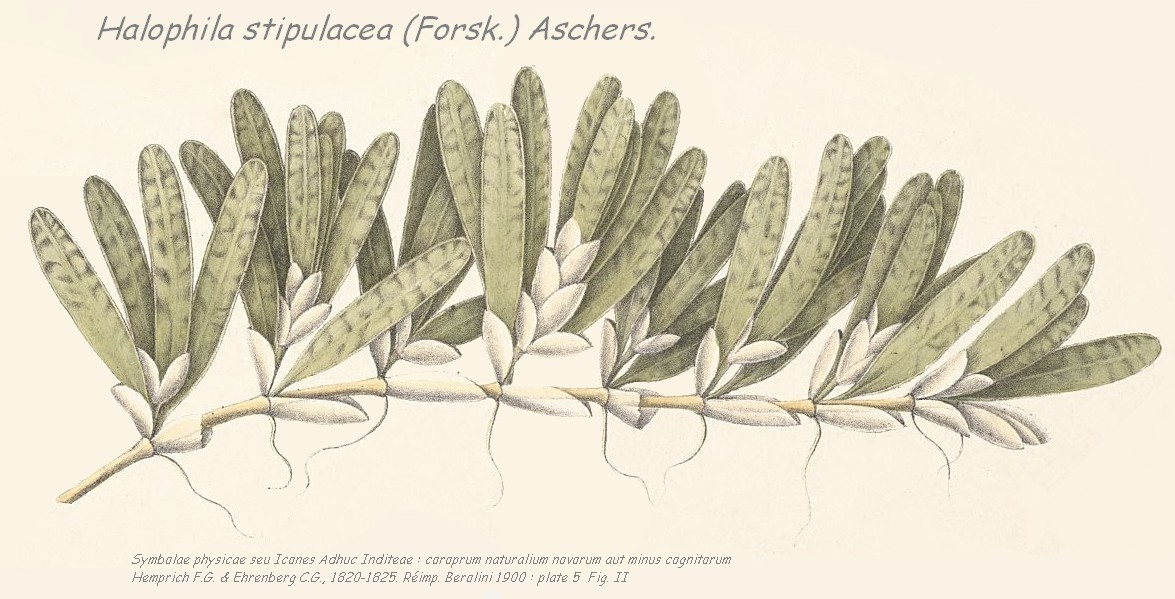

Conservation status
- Least Concern (IUCN 3.1)

Scientific classification
- Kingdom: Plantae
- Clade: Embryophytes
- Clade: Tracheophytes
- Clade: Angiosperms
- Clade: Monocots
- Order: Alismatales
- Family: Hydrocharitaceae
- Genus: Halophila
- Species: H. stipulacea

Binomial name
- Halophila stipulacea (Forssk.) Asch.

Synonyms
- Zostera stipulacea Forssk.; Thalassia stipulacea (Forssk.) K.D.Koenig; Barkania stipulacea (Forssk.) Zanardini ex Pritz.; Zostera bullata Delile; Barkania bullata (Delile) Ehrenb.; Thalassia bullata (Delile) Kunth; Halophila balfourii Soler.; Halophila madagascariensis Doty & B.C.Stone

= Halophila stipulacea =

Species of aquatic plant

Halophila stipulacea is a species of seagrass in the Hydrocharitaceae family. It is native to the Indian Ocean that spread into the Mediterranean after the opening of the Suez Canal. This seagrass is widespread through the Gulf of Aqaba. Recently it has arrived in the Caribbean where it is also spreading.

It is suggested that the expansion of H. stipulacea from the Red Sea into the Mediterranean Sea was a result of the opening of the Suez Canal in 1869. The invasion into the Mediterranean was first documented in 1894.

This species was first reported in the Caribbean in Grenada, Dominica, and St. Lucia in 2002, 2007, and 2008 respectively. By 2017, H. stipulacea had expanded to nineteen other Caribbean islands. In the United States Virgin Islands, H. stipulacea was first observed in 2012 along the northeast coast of St. John, followed by St. Thomas and St. Croix in 2013 and 2016 respectively. H. stipulacea was observed for the first time on the Venezuelan coast at Playa Mansa, near Naiguatá in Vargas state.

H. stipulacea has been classified as an invasive species because of its ability to displace native species. It can do this by forming thick mats, adapt to changes in environmental conditions, and exist along an extreme depth gradient.
