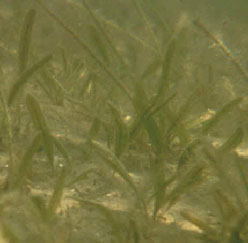
- Closeup of a bed of Johnson's seagrass

Scientific classification
- Kingdom: Plantae
- Clade: Tracheophytes
- Clade: Angiosperms
- Clade: Monocots
- Order: Alismatales
- Family: Hydrocharitaceae
- Genus: Halophila
- Species: H. ovalis
- Clone: H. o. Johnson's seagrass

Trionomial name
- Halophila ovalis Johnson's seagrass

Synonyms
- Halophila johnsonii Eiseman

= Johnson's seagrass =

Halophila ovalis Johnson's seagrass

Population of aquatic plant

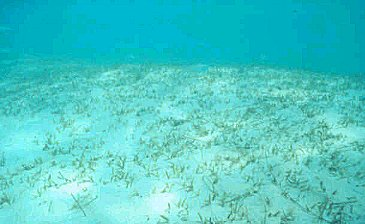
Bed of Johnson's seagrass

Johnson's seagrass is a small, asexual seagrass in the family Hydrocharitaceae (the "tape-grasses"). It has been called Halophila johnsonii, but is now considered to be a clone of the widespread species Halophila ovalis. As of March 2024, Plants of the World Online treats Halophila johnsonii as a synonym of Halophila ovalis subsp. ovalis. Johnson's seagrass occurs only on the southeastern coast of Florida, in lagoons along roughly 200 km of the Florida coastline between Sebastian Inlet and the northern part of Biscayne Bay, where it grows in small patches of a few centimeters to a few meters in diameter at depths ranging from the intertidal zone down to 3 meters. It was the first marine plant listed on the United States endangered species list, though it was removed from the listing in April 2022.

== Description ==
Johnson's seagrass has pairs of linearly shaped petiolate leaves, each generally 2-5 cm long including the petiole. The leaves grow from the nodes of a horizontally creeping rhizome found at or just below the surface of the sediment and held down by unbranched roots. The distance between the nodes of the rhizomes rarely exceeds 3-5 cm, making this species appear relatively small. Female flowers have been seen, but even with decade-long observational studies, neither male flowers nor seed have ever been observed.

== Conservation ==
Johnson's seagrass was the first marine plant listed on the United States endangered species list. However, in 2022 the National Marine Fisheries Service (NMFS) and National Oceanic and Atmospheric Administration (NOAA) ruled to remove Halophila johnsonii (Johnson's seagrass) from the Federal Endangered Species Act (ESA). This ruling was based on data that showed that Johnson's seagrass is not a genetically unique taxon. Johnson's seagrass is genetically similar to the Indo-Pacific species, H. ovalis, based on multiple published research. As Johnson's seagrass is not genetically diverse, it no longer meets the requirements set by the ESA to be considered a species. The ESA defines a species as "any subspecies of fish or wildlife or plants, and any distinct population segment of any species of vertebrate fish or wildlife which interbreeds when mature 16 U.S.C. 1532". All gene samples of Johnson's seagrass from Indian River Lagoon over a 17 year study were genetically uniform. In the same study it was determined that due to the lack of genetic diversity, Johnson's seagrass was a clone of H. ovalis, closely related to populations in Africa and Antigua. The clone may be derived from a recent introduction from one of those regions.

Both the green sea turtle and the West Indian manatee are known to feed upon the plant, as well as some herbivorous fish. However, the main threat to its survival is probably human activity. Processes that threaten the plant include eutrophication, dredging, turbidity, and thermal pollution.
