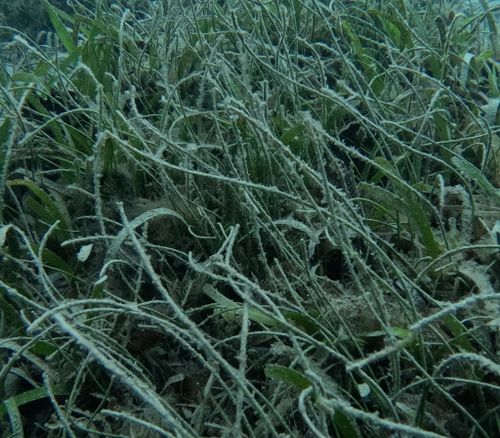

Conservation status
- Least Concern (IUCN 3.1)

Scientific classification
- Kingdom: Plantae
- Clade: Tracheophytes
- Clade: Angiosperms
- Clade: Monocots
- Order: Alismatales
- Family: Cymodoceaceae
- Genus: Halodule
- Species: H. pinifolia

Binomial name
- Halodule pinifolia (Miki) Hartog

= Halodule pinifolia =

Species of seagrass

Halodule pinifolia is a species of seagrass in the genus Halodule. It is found in shallow sea waters in the western Pacific ocean.

== Distribution and habitat ==
Halodule pinifolia is a common seagrass in Asian tropical coasts. It forms homogenous patches in intertidal zones, or it is occasionally intermixed with other seagrasses such as Halodule uninervis. Halodule pinifolia grows in sandy or muddy sand substrates from upper littoral to subtidal areas. It is ephemeral with rapid turn-over and high seed set and is well adapted to high levels of disturbance. This species is can grow rapidly and is a fast coloniser, often heavily epiphytised.

Halodule pinifolia has been studied at Laucala Bay on the island of Viti Levu, Fiji.

== Description ==
Compared with the closely related Halodule uninervis, Halodule pinifolia has a narrower blade size (1 mm versus 4 mm). Its fine, delicate leaves are up to 20 cm long, with one black central vein that splits into two at the rounded leaf tip. It usually has a pale rhizome, with clean black leaf scars.

In Fiji, Halodule pinifolia was observed to undergo hydrophilous pollination, in which pollen disperses directly on the water surface. Prior to dehiscence during low spring tides, the long filaments bearing the anthers become erect above the mass of filiform leaves. Once exposed to air, the 32 mm long filaments burst, releasing a cotton-like mass of filiform pollen which assemble into floating rafts on the water surface. Halodule pinifolia was found to be strictly dioecious.

== Ecology ==
This species is known to be hybridized to Halodule uninervis in Okinawa, Japan.
