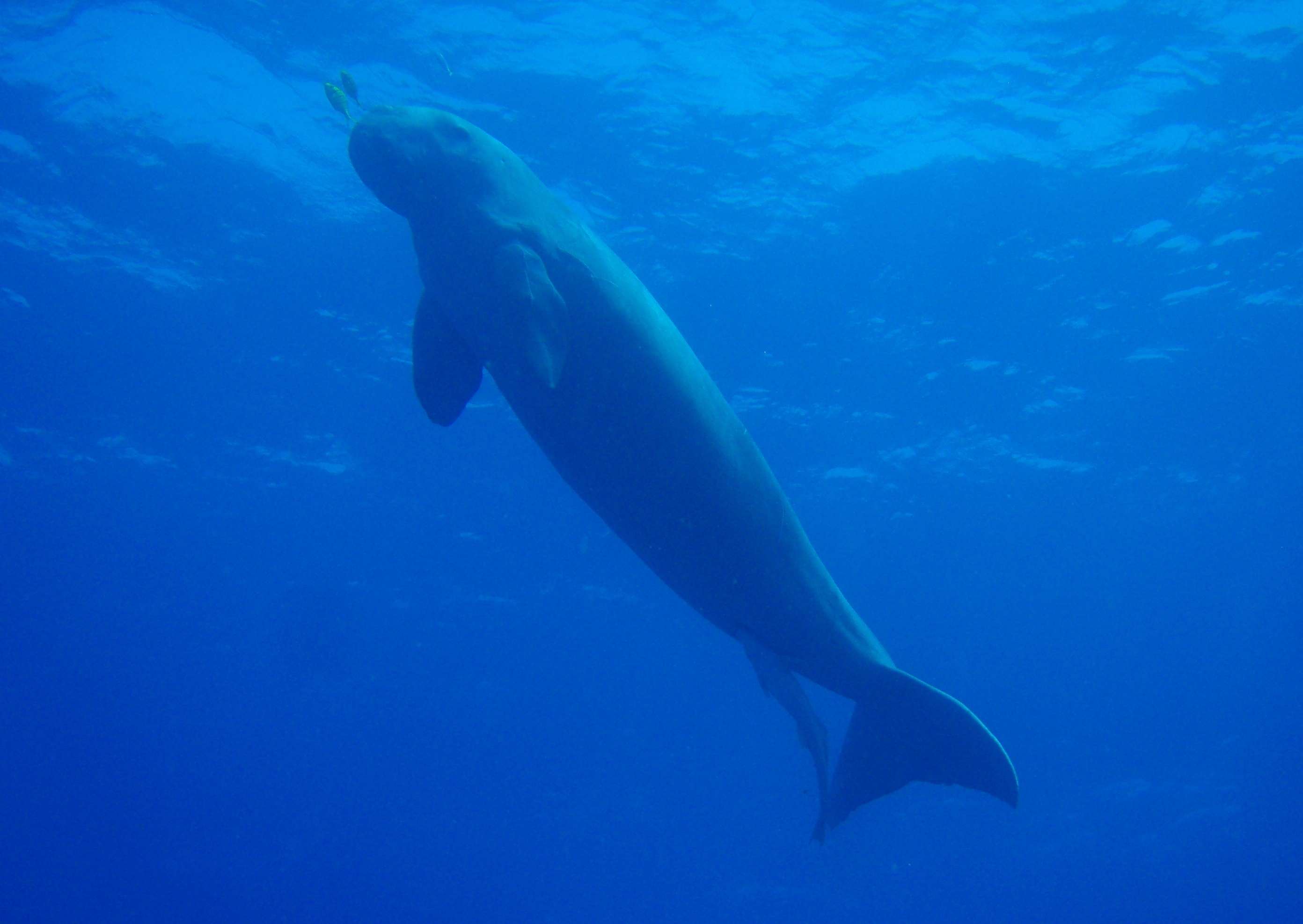
- A dugong photographed underwater

Conservation status
- Vulnerable (IUCN 3.1)
- CITES Appendix I

Scientific classification
- Kingdom: Animalia
- Phylum: Chordata
- Class: Mammalia
- Order: Sirenia
- Family: Dugongidae
- Subfamily: Dugonginae
- Genus: Dugong; Lacépède, 1799
- Species: D. dugon

Binomial name
- Dugong dugon (Müller, 1776)
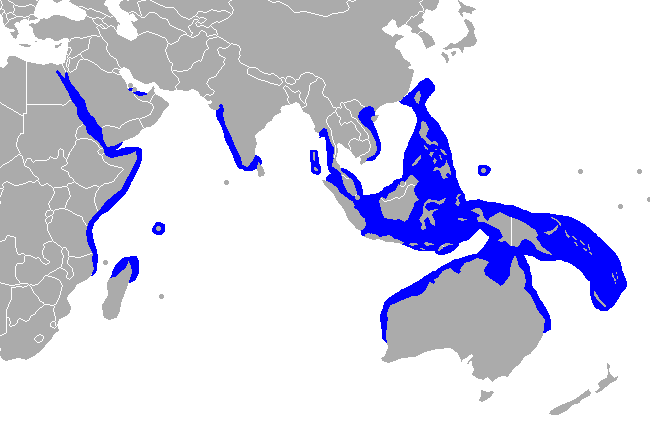
- Dugong range

= Dugong =

Dugong Temporal range: Miocene–recent

Species of marine mammal

The dugong (/ˈd(j)uːɡɒŋ/; Dugong dugon) is a marine mammal. It is one of four living species of the order Sirenia, which also includes three species of manatees. It is the only living representative of the once-diverse family Dugongidae; its closest modern relative, Steller's sea cow (Hydrodamalis gigas), was hunted to extinction in the 18th century.

The dugong is the only sirenian in its range, which spans the waters of some 40 countries and territories throughout the Indo-West Pacific. The dugong is largely dependent on seagrass communities for subsistence and is thus restricted to the coastal habitats that support seagrass meadows, with the largest dugong concentrations typically occurring in wide, shallow, protected areas, such as bays, mangrove channels, the waters of large inshore islands, and inter-reefal waters. The northern waters of Australia between Shark Bay and Moreton Bay are believed to be the dugong's contemporary stronghold.

Like all modern sirenians, the dugong has a fusiform body with no dorsal fin or hind limbs. The forelimbs or flippers are paddle-like. The dugong is easily distinguishable from the manatees by its fluked, dolphin-like tail; it also possesses a unique skull and teeth. Its snout is sharply downturned, an adaptation for feeding in benthic seagrass communities. The molar teeth are simple and peg-like, unlike the more elaborate molar dentition of manatees.

The dugong has been hunted for thousands of years for its meat and oil. Traditional hunting still has great cultural significance in several parts of its modern range, particularly northern Australia and the Pacific Islands. The dugong's current distribution is fragmented, and many populations are believed to be close to extinction. The IUCN lists the dugong as a species vulnerable to extinction, while the Convention on International Trade in Endangered Species limits or bans the trade of derived products. Despite it being legally protected in many countries, the main causes of population decline remain anthropogenic and include fishing-related fatalities, habitat degradation, and hunting. With its long lifespan of 70 years or more and slow rate of reproduction, the dugong is especially vulnerable to extinction.

== Evolution ==
Dugongs are part of the Sirenia order of placental mammals which comprises modern "sea cows" (manatees as well as dugongs) and their extinct relatives. Sirenia are the only extant herbivorous marine mammals and the only group of herbivorous mammals to have become completely aquatic. Sirenians are thought to have a 50-million-year-old fossil record (early Eocene-recent). They attained modest diversity during the Oligocene and Miocene but subsequently declined as a result of climatic cooling, oceanographic changes, and human interference.

== Etymology and taxonomy ==
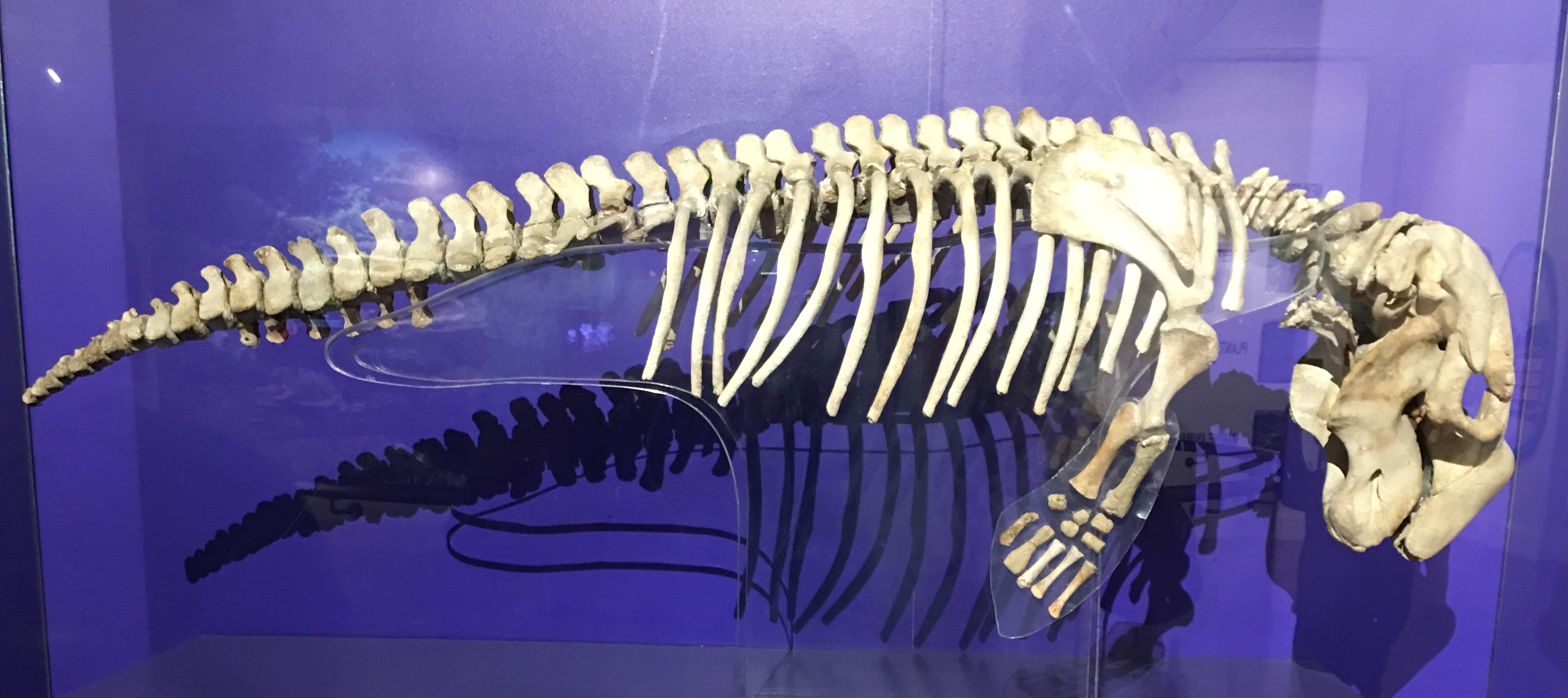
Dugong skeleton displayed at Philippine National Museum

3D model of dugong skeleton

The word "dugong" derives from the Visayan (probably Cebuano) dugung. The name was first adopted and popularized by the French naturalist Georges-Louis Leclerc, Comte de Buffon, as "dugon" in Histoire Naturelle (1765), after descriptions of the animal from the island of Leyte in the Philippines. The name ultimately derives from Proto-Malayo-Polynesian *duyuŋ. Despite a common misconception, the term does not come from Malay duyung and it does not mean "lady of the sea" (mermaid).

Other common local names include "sea cow", "sea pig", and "sea camel". It is known as the balguja by the Wunambal people of the Mitchell Plateau area in the Kimberley, Western Australia.

Dugong dugon is the only extant species of the family Dugongidae, and one of only four extant species of the Sirenia order, the others forming the manatee family. It was first classified by Müller in 1776 as Trichechus dugon, a member of the manatee genus previously defined by Linnaeus. It was later assigned as the type species of Dugong by Lacépède and further classified within its own family by Gray and subfamily by Simpson.

Dugongs and other sirenians are not closely related to other marine mammals, being more closely related to elephants. Sirenians and elephants share a monophyletic group with hyraxes and the aardvark, one of the earliest offshoots of eutherians. The fossil record shows sirenians appearing in the Eocene, when they most likely lived in the Tethys Ocean. The two extant families of sirenians are thought to have diverged in the mid-Eocene, after which the dugongs and their closest relative, the Steller's sea cow, split off from a common ancestor in the Miocene. The Steller's sea cow became extinct in the 18th century. No fossils exist of other members of the Dugongidae.

Molecular studies have been conducted on dugong populations using mitochondrial DNA. The results have suggested that the population in Southeast Asia is distinct from the others. Australia has two distinct maternal lineages, one of which also contains the dugongs from Africa and Arabia. Limited genetic mixing has taken place between those in Southeast Asia and those in Australia, mostly around Timor. One of the lineages stretches from Moreton Bay to Western Australia, while the other only stretches from Moreton Bay to the Northern Territory. There is not yet sufficient genetic data to make clear the boundaries between distinct groups.

== Anatomy and morphology ==
The dugong's body is large with a cylindrical shape that tapers at both ends. It has thick, smooth skin that is a pale cream colour at birth but darkens dorsally and laterally to brownish-to-dark-grey with age. The colour of a dugong can change due to the growth of algae on the skin.

An adult's length rarely exceeds 3 metres (10 ft). An individual this long is expected to weigh around 420 kilograms (930 lb). Weight in adults is typically more than 250 kilograms (550 lb) and less than 900 kilograms (1,980 lb). The largest individual recorded was 4.06 metres (13 ft 4 in) long and weighed 1,016 kilograms (2,240 lb), and was found off the Saurashtra coast of west India. Females tend to be larger than males.

The body is sparsely covered in short hair, a common feature among sirenians which may allow for tactile interpretation of their environment. These hairs are most developed around the mouth, which has a large horseshoe-shaped upper lip forming a highly mobile muzzle. This muscular upper lip aids the dugong in foraging.

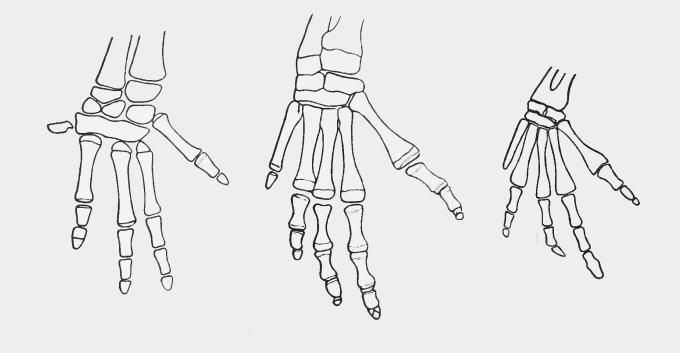
Bones in the forelimb can fuse variously with age.

The dugong's tail flukes and flippers are similar to those of dolphins. These flukes are raised up and down in long strokes to move the animal forward and can be twisted to turn. The forelimbs are paddle-like flippers which aid in turning and slowing. The dugong lacks nails on its flippers, which are only 15% of a dugong's body length. The tail has deep notches.

A dugong's brain weighs a maximum of 300 g (11 oz), about 0.1% of the animal's body weight. With very small eyes, dugongs have limited vision, but acute hearing within narrow sound thresholds. Their ears, which lack pinnae, are located on the sides of their head. The nostrils are located on top of the head and can be closed using valves. Dugongs have two teats, one located behind each flipper. There are few differences between the sexes; the body structures are almost the same. A male's testes are not externally located, and the main difference between males and females is the location of the genital aperture to the umbilicus and the anus. The lungs in a dugong are very long, extending almost as far as the kidneys, which are also highly elongated to cope with the saltwater environment. If the dugong is wounded, its blood will clot rapidly.

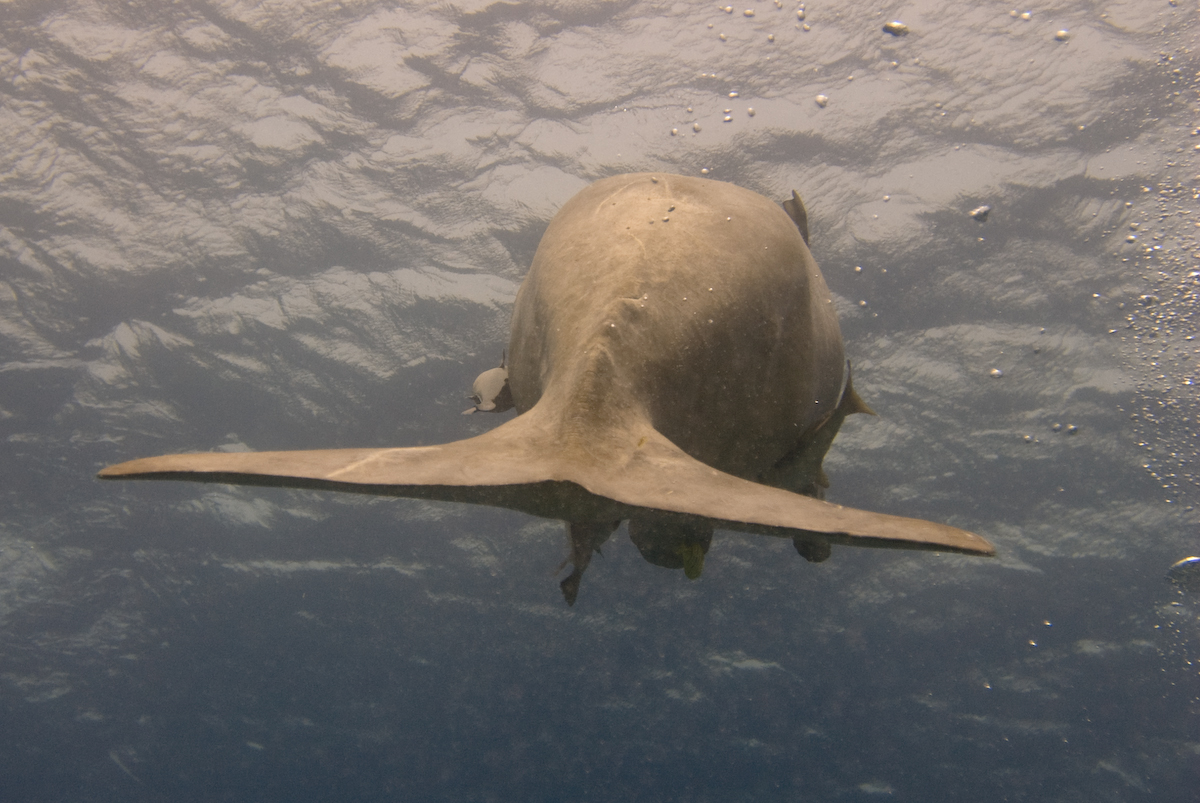
Dugong tail fluke

The skull of a dugong is unique. The skull is enlarged with a sharply down-turned premaxilla, which is stronger in males. The spine has between 57 and 60 vertebrae. Unlike in manatees, the dugong's teeth do not continually grow back via horizontal tooth replacement. The dugong has two incisors (tusks) which emerge in males during puberty. The female's tusks continue to grow without emerging during puberty, sometimes erupting later in life after reaching the base of the premaxilla. The number of growth layer groups in a tusk indicates the age of a dugong, and the cheek teeth move forward with age.

The full dental formula of dugongs is 2.0.3.33.1.3.3, meaning they have two incisors, three premolars, and three molars on each side of their upper jaw, and three incisors, one canine, three premolars, and three molars on each side of their lower jaw. Like other sirenians, the dugong experiences pachyostosis, a condition in which the ribs and other long bones are unusually solid and contain little or no marrow. These heavy bones, which are among the densest in the animal kingdom, may act as a ballast to help keep sirenians suspended slightly below the water's surface.

== Distribution and habitat ==
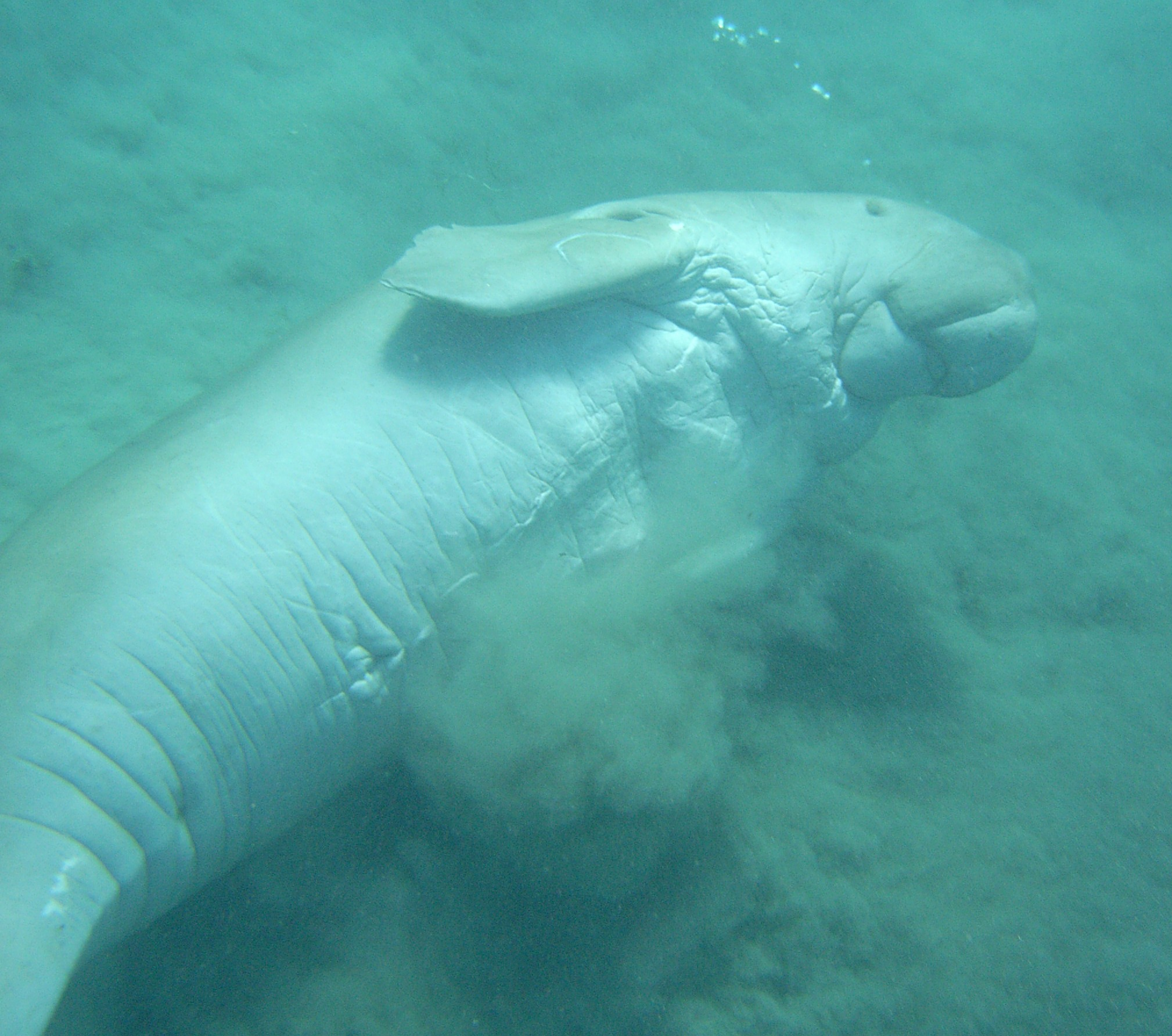
Dugong on the sea floor at Marsa Alam, Egypt

Dugongs are found in warm coastal waters from the western Pacific Ocean to the eastern coast of Africa, along an estimated 140,000 kilometres (87,000 mi) of coastline between 26° and 27° to the north and south of the equator. Their historic range is believed to correspond to that of seagrasses from the Potamogetonaceae and Hydrocharitaceae families. The full size of the former range is unknown, although it is believed that the current populations represent the historical limits of the range, which is highly fractured. Their distributions during warmer periods of the Holocene might have been broader than today. Today, populations of dugongs are found in the waters of 37 countries and territories. Recorded numbers of dugongs are generally believed to be lower than actual numbers, due to a lack of accurate surveys. Despite this uncertainty, the dugong population is thought to be shrinking, with a worldwide decline of 20 percent in the last 90 years. They have disappeared from the waters of Hong Kong, Mauritius, and Taiwan, as well as parts of Cambodia, Japan, the Philippines, and Vietnam. Further disappearances are likely.

Dugongs are generally found in warm coastal waters with large numbers concentrated in wide and shallow protected bays. The dugong is the only strictly marine herbivorous mammal, as all species of manatee utilise fresh water to some degree. Nonetheless, they can tolerate the brackish waters found in coastal wetlands, and large numbers are also found in wide and shallow mangrove channels and around leeward sides of large inshore islands, where seagrass beds are common. They are usually located at a depth of around 10 m (33 ft), although in areas where the continental shelf remains shallow, dugongs have been known to travel more than ten kilometres (6 mi) from the shore, descending to as far as 37 metres (121 ft), where deepwater seagrasses such as Halophila spinulosa are found. Specific habitats are used for different activities. It has been observed that shallow waters are used as sites for calving, minimizing the risk of predation. Deep waters may provide a thermal refuge from cooler waters closer to the shore during winter.

=== Australia ===
Australia is home to the largest population, stretching from Shark Bay in Western Australia to Moreton Bay in Queensland. The population of Shark Bay is thought to be stable with over 10,000 dugongs. Smaller populations exist up the coast, including one in Ashmore Reef. Large numbers of dugongs live to the north of the Northern Territory, with a population of over 20,000 in the Gulf of Carpentaria alone. A population of over 25,000 exists in the Torres Strait such as off Thursday Island, although there is significant migration between the strait and the waters of New Guinea.

The Great Barrier Reef provides important feeding areas for the species; this reef area houses a stable population of around 10,000, although the population concentration has shifted over time. Large bays facing north on the Queensland coast provide significant habitats for dugong, with the southernmost of these being Hervey Bay and Moreton Bay. Dugongs had been occasional visitors along the Gold Coast where a re-establishment of a local population through range expansions has started recently.

=== Arabian Gulf ===
The Arabian Gulf has the second-largest dugong population in the world, inhabiting most of the southern coast, and the current population is believed to range from 5,800 to 7,300. In the course of a study carried out in 1986 and 1999 on the Arabian Gulf, the largest reported group sighting was made of more than 600 individuals to the west of Qatar. A 2017 study found a nearly 25% drop in population since 1950. Reasons for this drastic population loss include illegal poaching, oil spills, and net entanglement.

=== East Africa and South Asia ===
In the late 1960s, herds of up to 500 dugongs were observed off the coast of East Africa and nearby islands. Current populations in this area are extremely small, numbering 50 and below, and it is thought likely they will become extinct. The eastern side of the Red Sea is home to large populations numbering in the hundreds, and similar populations are thought to exist on the western side. In the 1980s, it was estimated there could be as many as 4,000 dugongs in the Red Sea. Dugong populations in Madagascar are poorly studied, but due to widespread exploitation, it is thought they may have severely declined, with few surviving individuals. The resident population around Mayotte is thought to number just 10 individuals. In Mozambique, most of the remaining local populations are very small and the largest (about 120 individuals) occurs at Bazaruto Island, but they have become rare in historical habitats such as in Maputo Bay and on Inhaca Island. The Bazaruto Island population is possibly the last long-term viable population in East Africa, with only some of its core territory lying within protected waters.

The East African population is genetically distinct from those of the Red Sea and those off Madagascar. In Tanzania, observations have recently increased around the Mafia Island Marine Park where a hunt was intended by fishermen but failed in 2009. In the Seychelles, dugongs had been regarded as extinct in the 18th century until a small number was discovered around the Aldabra Atoll. This population may belong to a different group than that distributed among the inner isles. Dugongs once thrived among the Chagos Archipelago and Sea Cow Island was named after the species, although the species no longer occurs in the region.

There are fewer than 250 individuals scattered throughout Indian waters. A highly isolated breeding population exists in the Marine National Park, Gulf of Kutch, the only remaining population in western India. It is 1,500 kilometres (800 nautical miles) from the population in the Arabian Gulf, and 1,700 kilometres (900 nmi) from the nearest population in India. Former populations in this area, centered on the Maldives and the Lakshadweep, are presumed to be extinct. A population exists in the Gulf of Mannar Marine National Park and the Palk Strait between India and Sri Lanka, but it is seriously depleted. Recoveries of seagrass beds along former ranges of dugongs, such as the Chilika Lake have been confirmed in recent years, raising hopes for re-colonizations of the species. The population around the Andaman and Nicobar Islands is known only from a few records, and although the population was large during British rule, it is now believed to be small and scattered.

=== Southeast Asia and the West Pacific ===
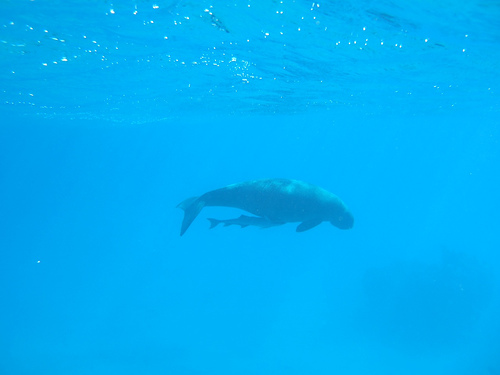
Dugong with attached remora off Lamen Island, Vanuatu

A small population existed along the southern coast of China, particularly the Gulf of Tonkin (Beibu Gulf), where efforts were made to protect it, including the establishment of a seagrass sanctuary for dugong and other endangered marine fauna ranging in Guangxi. Despite these efforts, numbers continued to decrease, and in 2007 it was reported that no more dugong could be found on the west coast of the island of Hainan. Historically, dugongs were also present in the southern parts of the Yellow Sea. The last confirmed record of dugongs in Chinese waters was documented in 2008. In August 2022, an article published on the Royal Society Open Science concluded that dugongs were functionally extinct in China, which was based on a large-scale interview survey conducted across four southern Chinese maritime provinces (Hainan, Guangxi, Guangdong, and Fujian) in the summer of 2019.

In Vietnam, dugongs have been restricted mostly to the provinces of Kiên Giang and Bà Rịa–Vũng Tàu, including Phú Quốc Island and Côn Đảo Island, which hosted large populations in the past. Côn Đảo is now the only site in Vietnam where dugongs are regularly seen, protected within the Côn Đảo National Park. Nonetheless, dangerously low levels of attention to the conservation of marine organisms in Vietnam and Cambodia may result in increased intentional or unintentional catches, and illegal trade is a potential danger for local dugongs. On Phú Quốc, the first 'Dugong Festival' was held in 2014, aiming to raise awareness of these issues.

In Thailand, the present distribution of dugongs is restricted to six provinces along the Andaman Sea, and very few dugongs are present in the Gulf of Thailand. The Gulf of Thailand was historically home to a large number of animals, but none have been sighted in the west of the gulf in recent years, and the remaining population in the east is thought to be very small and possibly declining. Dugongs are believed to exist in the Straits of Johor in very small numbers. The waters around Borneo support a small population, with more scattered throughout the Malay Archipelago.

All the islands of the Philippines once provided habitats for sizeable herds of dugongs. They were common until the 1970s when their numbers declined sharply due to accidental drownings in fishing gear and habitat destruction of seagrass meadows. Today, only isolated populations survive, most notably in the waters of the Calamian Islands in Palawan, Isabela in Luzon, Guimaras, and Mindanao. The dugong became the first marine animal protected by Philippine law, with harsh penalties for harming them. Recently, the local marine trash problem in the archipelago remained unabated and became the biggest threat to the already dwindling population of dugongs in the country. Litters of plastic waste (single-use sachets, plastic bottles, fast food to-go containers, etc.) and other non-biodegradable materials abound in the coastal areas. As these materials may be mistaken as food by dugongs, these may lead to death due to plastic ingestion. Overpopulation and lack of education of all coastal fisherfolk in the Philippines regarding marine trash are harming the coastal environment not only in Palawan but also across the islands of the Philippines. The first documented sighting in Sarangani Bay occurred in July 2024.

Populations also exist around the Solomon Islands and New Caledonia, stretching to an easternmost population in Vanuatu. A highly isolated population lives around the islands of Palau.

A single dugong lives at Cocos (Keeling) Islands, although the animal is thought to be a vagrant.

=== Northern Pacific ===
Today, possibly the smallest and northernmost population of dugongs exists around the Ryukyu islands, and a population formerly existed off Taiwan. An endangered population of 50 or fewer dugongs, possibly as few as three individuals, survives around Okinawa. New sightings of a cow and calf have been reported in 2017, indicating a possible breeding had occurred in these waters. A single individual was recorded at Amami Ōshima, at the northernmost edge of the dugong's historic range, more than 40 years after the last previous recorded sighting. A vagrant strayed into a port near Ushibuka, Kumamoto, and died due to poor health. Historically, the Yaeyama Islands held a large concentration of dugongs, with more than 300 individuals. On the Aragusuku Islands, large quantities of skulls are preserved at a utaki that outsiders are strictly forbidden to enter. Dugong populations in these areas were reduced by historical hunts as payments to the Ryukyu Kingdom, before being wiped out because of large-scale illegal hunting and fishing using destructive methods such as dynamite fishing after the Second World War.

In March 2025, a fisherman accidentally caught a dugong in his nets at Fenniaolin in Yilin County in northeast Taiwan, which he released back into the sea. This was the first sighting of a live dugong in Taiwan waters in 88 years.

Populations around Taiwan appear to be almost extinct, although remnant individuals may visit areas with rich seagrass beds such as Dongsha Atoll. Some of the last reported sightings were made in Kenting National Park in the 1950s and 60s. There had been occasional records of vagrants at the Northern Mariana Islands before 1985. It is unknown how much mixing there was between these populations historically. Some theorize that populations existed independently, for example, that the Okinawan population was isolated members derived from the migration of a Philippine subspecies. Others postulate that the populations formed part of a super-population, where migration between Ryukyu, Taiwan, and the Philippines was common.

=== Extinct Mediterranean population ===
It has been confirmed that dugongs once inhabited the water of the Mediterranean possibly until after the rise of civilizations along the inland sea. This population possibly shared ancestry with the Red Sea population, and the Mediterranean population had never been large due to geographical factors and climate changes. The Mediterranean is the region where the Dugongidae originated in the mid-late Eocene, along with the Caribbean Sea.

== Ecology and life history ==
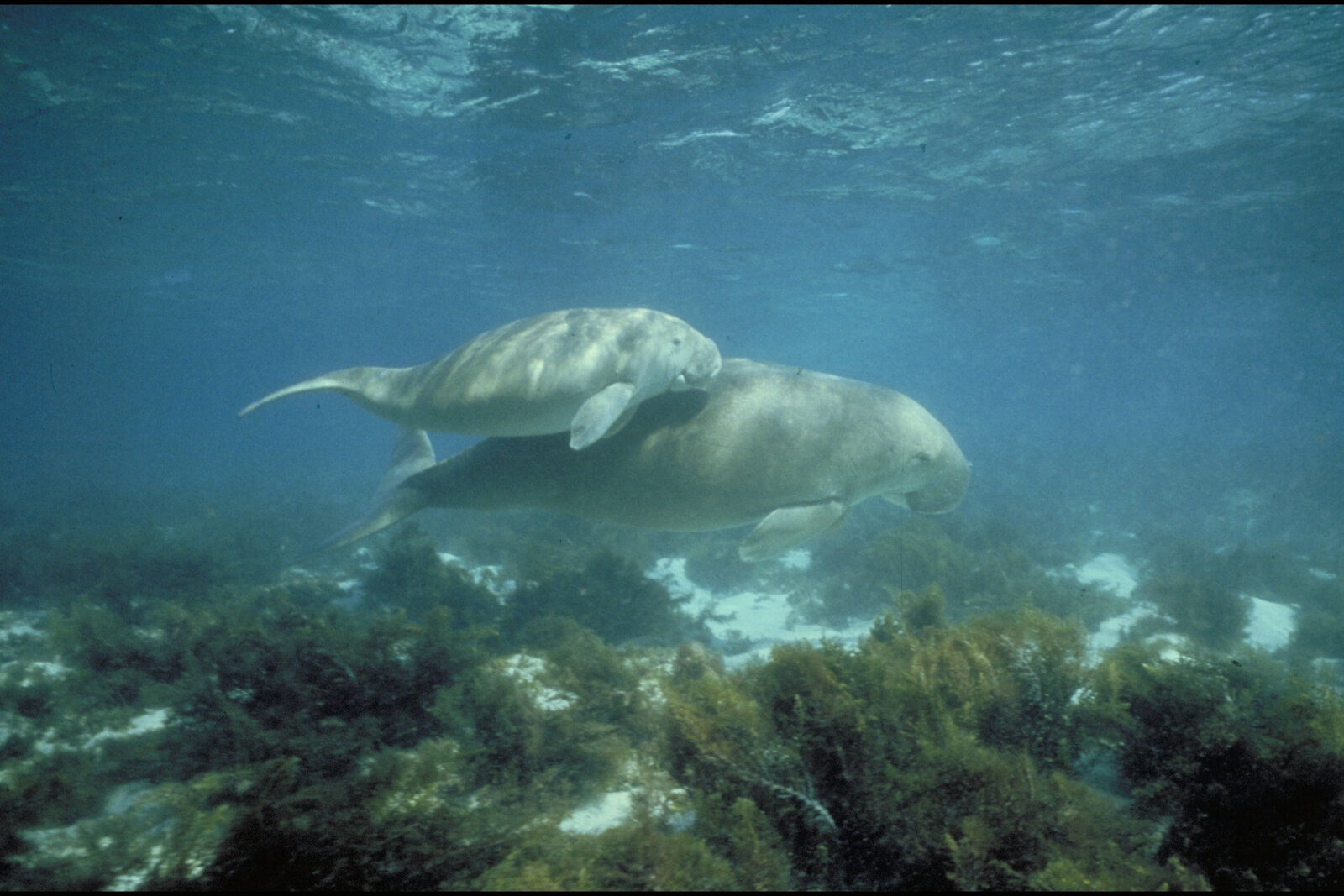
A mother and calf in shallow water

Dugongs are long-lived, and the oldest recorded specimen reached age 73. They have few natural predators, although animals such as crocodiles, killer whales, and sharks pose a threat to the young, and a dugong has also been recorded to have died from trauma after being impaled by a stingray barb. A large number of infections and parasitic diseases affect dugongs. Detected pathogens include helminths, cryptosporidium, different types of bacterial infections, and other unidentified parasites. 30% of dugong deaths in Queensland since 1996 are thought to be because of disease.

Although they are social animals, they are usually solitary or found in pairs due to the inability of seagrass beds to support large populations. Gatherings of hundreds of dugongs sometimes happen, but they last only for a short time. Because they are shy and do not approach humans, little is known about dugong behavior. They can go six minutes without breathing (though about two and a half minutes is more typical), and have been known to rest on their tails to breathe with their heads above water. They can dive to a maximum depth of 39 metres (128 ft); they spend most of their lives no deeper than 10 metres (33 ft). Communication between individuals is through chirps, whistles, barks, and other sounds that echo underwater. Different sounds have been observed with different amplitudes and frequencies, implying different purposes. Visual communication is limited due to poor eyesight and is mainly used for activities such as lekking for courtship purposes. Mothers and calves are in almost constant physical contact, and calves have been known to reach out and touch their mothers with their flippers for reassurance.

Dugongs are semi-nomadic, often traveling long distances in search of food, but staying within a certain range their entire lives. Large numbers often move together from one area to another. It is thought that these movements are caused by changes in seagrass availability. Their memory allows them to return to specific points after long travels. Dugong movements mostly occur within a localized area of seagrass beds, and animals in the same region show individualistic patterns of movement. Daily movement is affected by the tides. In areas where there is a large tidal range, dugongs travel with the tide to access shallower feeding areas. In Moreton Bay, dugongs often travel between foraging grounds inside the bay and warmer oceanic waters. At higher latitudes dugongs make seasonal travels to reach warmer water during the winter. Occasionally individual dugongs make long-distance travels over many days and can travel over deep ocean waters. One animal was seen as far south as Sydney. Although they are marine creatures, dugongs have been known to travel up creeks, and in one case a dugong was caught fifteen kilometres (8 nmi) up a creek near Cooktown.

=== Feeding ===
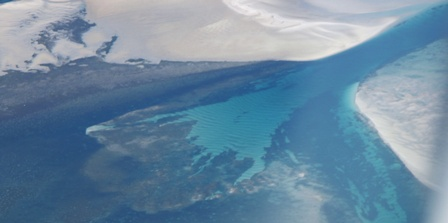
Typical dugong feeding area in Moreton Bay

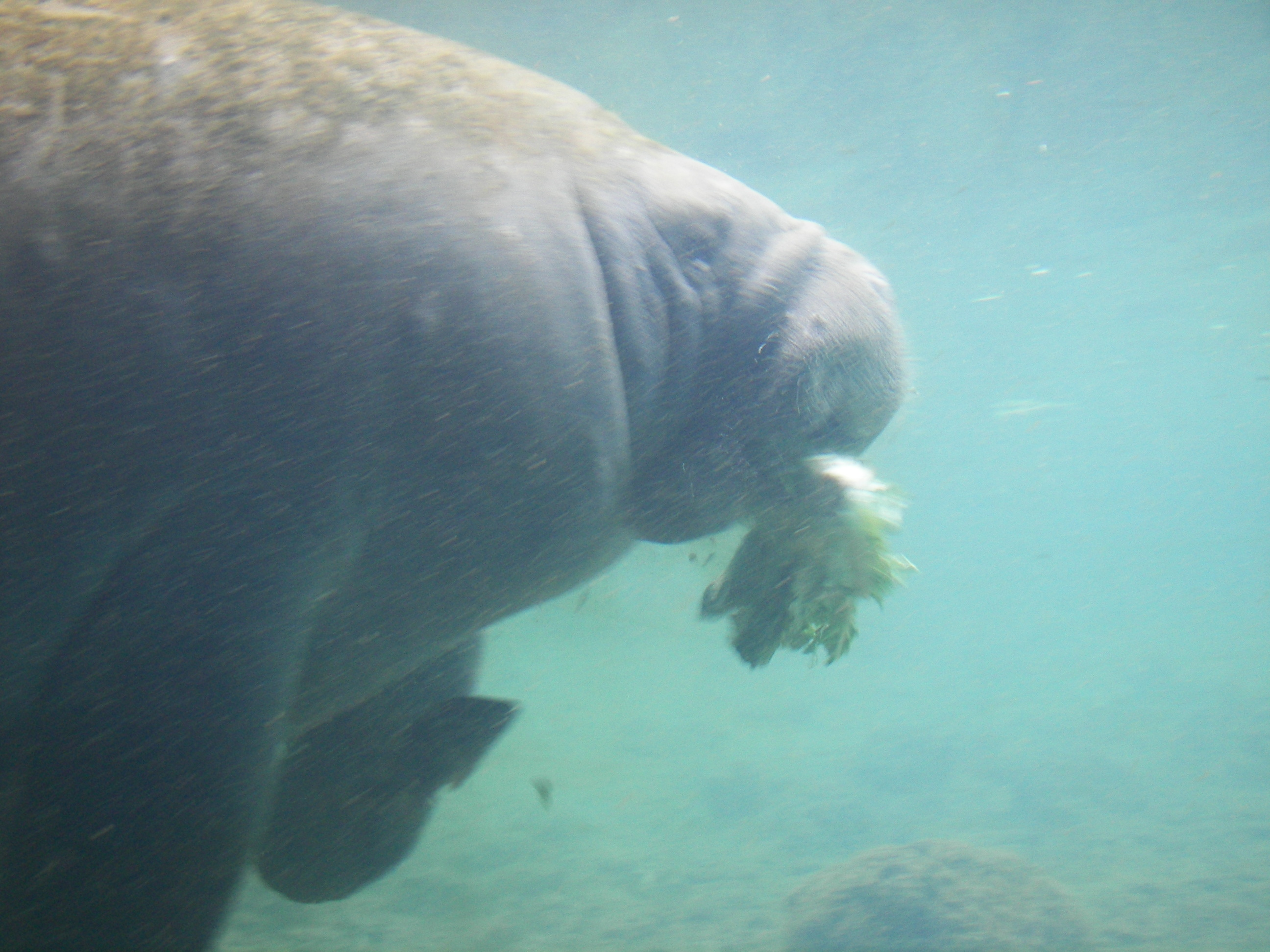
Dugong feeding

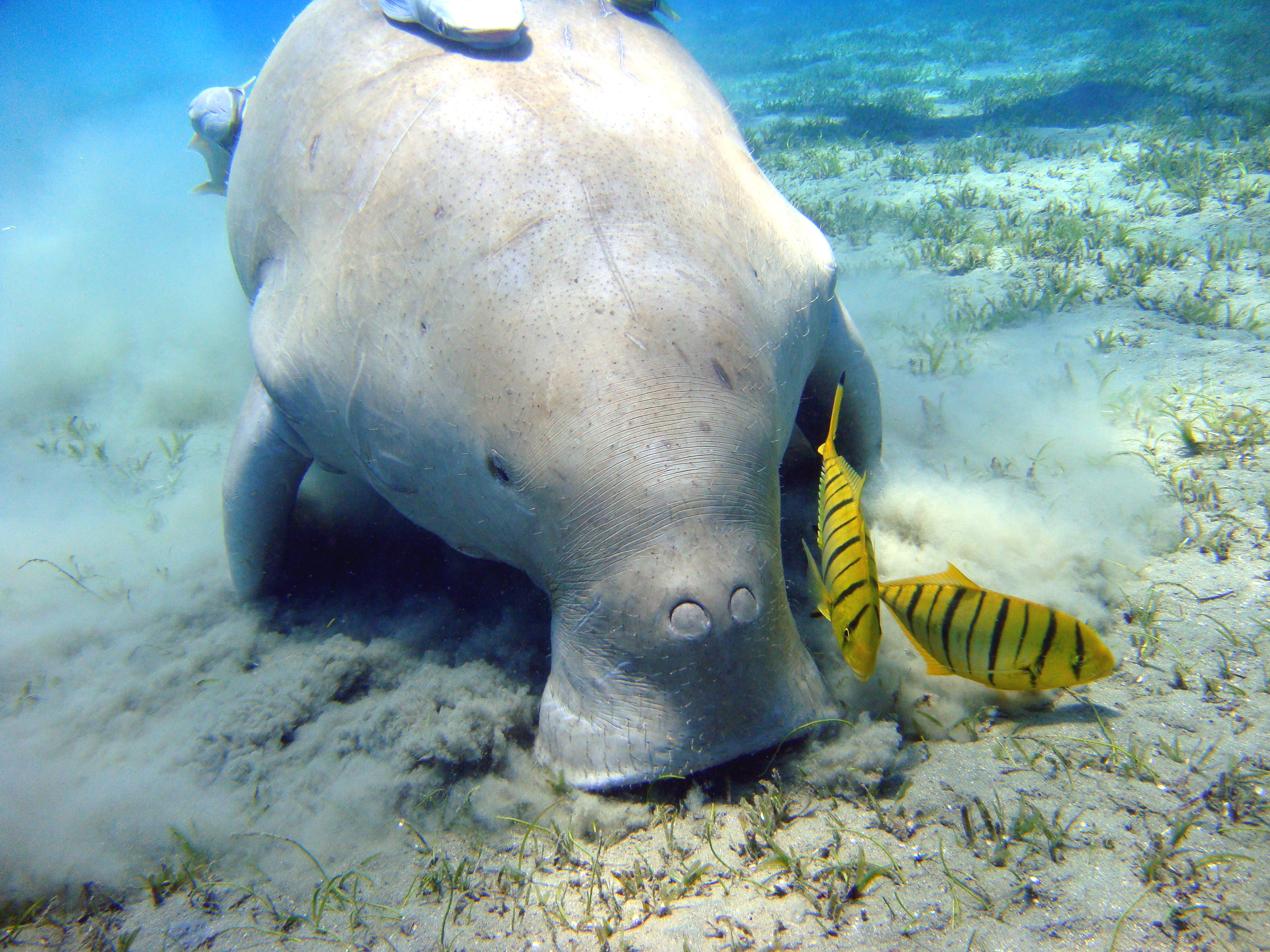
Dugong feeding, with juvenile golden trevally, near Marsa Alam

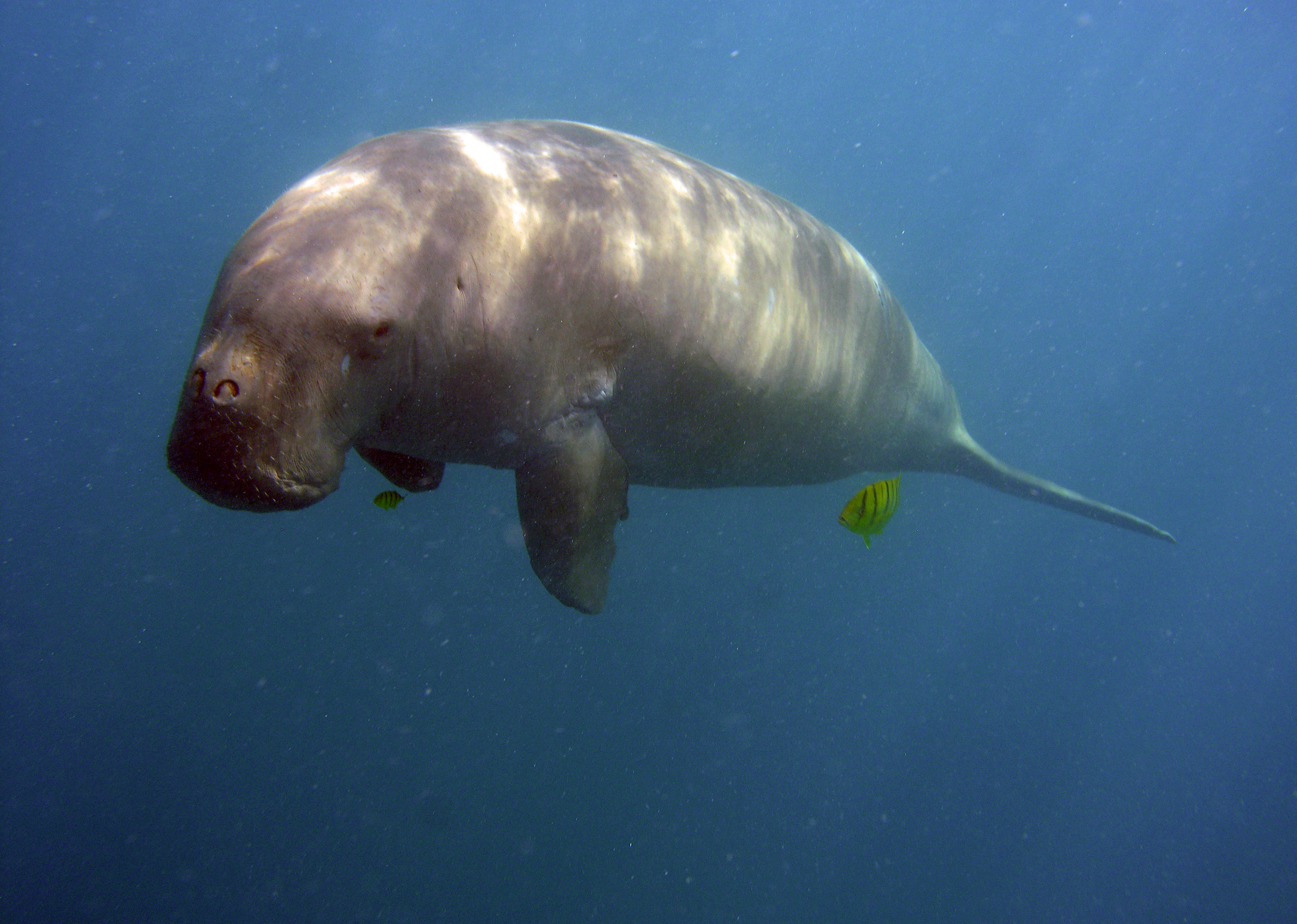
Dugong with juvenile golden trevally, Neil Island, Ritchie's Archipelago

Dugongs, along with other sirenians, are referred to as "sea cows" because their diet consists mainly of seagrass, particularly the genera Halophila and Halodule. When eating they ingest the whole plant, including the roots, although when this is impossible they will feed on just the leaves. A wide variety of seagrass has been found in dugong stomach contents, and evidence exists they will eat algae when seagrass is scarce. Although almost completely herbivorous, they will occasionally eat invertebrates, such as jellyfish, sea squirts, and shellfish. Dugongs in Moreton Bay, Australia, are omnivorous, feeding on invertebrates such as polychaetes or marine algae when the supply of their choice grasses decreases. In other southern areas of both western and eastern Australia, there is evidence that dugongs actively seek out large invertebrates. This does not apply to dugongs in tropical areas, in which fecal evidence indicates that invertebrates are not eaten.

Most dugongs do not feed in lush areas, but where the seagrass is more sparse. Additional factors such as protein concentration and regenerative ability also affect the value of a seagrass bed. The chemical structure and composition of the seagrass are important, and the grass species most often eaten are low in fiber, high in nitrogen, and easily digestible. In the Great Barrier Reef, dugongs feed on low-fiber high-nitrogen seagrass such as Halophila and Halodule, to maximize nutrient intake instead of bulk eating. Seagrasses of a lower seral are preferred, where the area has not fully vegetated. Only certain seagrass meadows are suitable for dugong consumption, due to the dugong's highly specialized diet. There is evidence that dugongs actively alter seagrass species compositions at local levels. Dugongs may search out deeper seagrass. Feeding trails have been observed as deep as 33 metres (108 ft), and dugongs have been seen feeding as deep as 37 metres (121 ft). Dugongs are relatively slow-moving, swimming at around 10 km/h (3 m/s). When moving along the seabed to feed, they walk on their pectoral fins.

Dugong feeding may favor the subsequent growth of low-fibre, high-nitrogen seagrasses such as Halophilia and Halodule. Species such as Zosteria capricorni are more dominant in established seagrass beds, but grow slowly, while Halophilia and Halodule grow quickly in the open space left by dugong feeding. This behavior is known as cultivation grazing and favors the rapidly growing, higher nutrient seagrasses that dugongs prefer. Dugongs may also prefer to feed on younger, less fibrous strands of seagrasses, and cycles of cultivation feeding at different seagrass meadows may provide them with a greater number of younger plants.

Due to their poor eyesight, dugongs often use smell to locate edible plants. They also have a strong tactile sense and feel their surroundings with their long sensitive bristles. They will dig up an entire plant and then shake it to remove the sand before eating it. They have been known to collect a pile of plants in one area before eating them. The flexible and muscular upper lip is used to dig out the plants. This leaves furrows in the sand in their path.

=== Reproduction and parental care ===
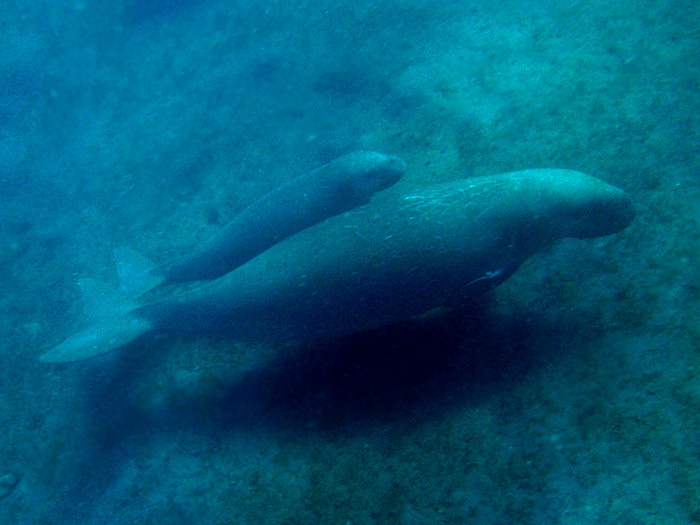
Dugong mother and offspring from East Timor

A dugong reaches sexual maturity between the ages of eight and eighteen, older than in most other mammals. Females know that a male has reached sexual maturity by the eruption of the male's tusks, since tusks erupt in males when testosterone levels reach a high enough level. The age when a female first gives birth is disputed, with some studies placing the age between ten and seventeen years while others place it as early as six years. There is evidence that male dugongs lose fertility at older ages.

Despite the longevity of the dugong, which may live for 50 years or more, females give birth only a few times during their lives and invest considerable parental care in their young. The time between births is unclear, with estimates ranging from 2.4 to 7 years.

Mating behaviour varies between populations located in different areas. In some populations, males establish a territory that females in estrus then visit. In these areas, the male attempts to impress females while defending the area from other males, a practice known as lekking. In other areas many males attempt to mate with the same female, sometimes inflicting injuries on the female or each other. During this event, the female copulates with multiple males, who fight to mount her from below. This greatly increases the chances of conception.

Females give birth after a 13- to 15-month gestation, usually to just one calf. Birth occurs in very shallow water, with occasions known where the mothers were almost on the shore. As soon as the young is born the mother pushes it to the surface to take a breath. Newborns are already 1.2 metres (4 ft) long and weigh around 30 kilograms (65 lb). Once born, calves stay close to their mothers, possibly to make swimming easier. The calf nurses for 14–18 months, although it begins to eat seagrasses soon after birth. A calf leaves its mother only after it has matured.

== Importance to humans ==
Dugongs have historically provided easy targets for hunters, who killed them for their meat, oil, skin, and bones. As the anthropologist A. Asbjørn Jøn has noted, they are often considered the inspiration for mermaids, and people around the world developed cultures around dugong hunting. In some areas, it remains an animal of great significance, and a growing ecotourism industry around dugongs has had an economic benefit in some countries.

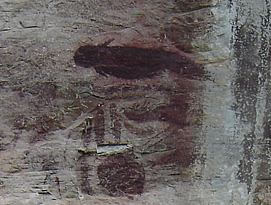
A cave painting of a dugong – Tambun Cave, Perak, Malaysia

There is a 5,000-year-old wall painting of a dugong, apparently drawn by Neolithic peoples, in Tambun Cave, Ipoh, Malaysia. This was discovered by Lieutenant R.L. Rawlings in 1959 while on a routine patrol.

Dugongs feature in Southeast Asian, especially Austronesian, folklore. In languages like Ilocano, Mapun, Yakan, Tausug, and Kadazan Dusun of the Philippines and Sabah, the name for dugongs is a synonym for "mermaid". In Malay, they are sometimes referred to as perempuan laut ("woman of the sea") or putri duyong ("mermaid princess"), leading to the misconception that the word "dugong" itself means "lady of the sea".

A common belief found in the Philippines, Malaysia, Indonesia, and Thailand is that dugongs were originally human or part-human (usually women), and that they cry when they are butchered or beached. Thus, it is considered bad luck if dugongs are killed or accidentally die in nets or fish corrals in the Philippines, some parts of Sabah (Malaysia), and northern Sulawesi and the Lesser Sunda Islands (Indonesia). Dugongs are predominantly not traditionally hunted for food in these regions and they remained plentiful until around the 1970s. Conversely, dugong "tears" are considered aphrodisiacs in other parts of Indonesia, Malaysia, Thailand, Singapore, Brunei, Vietnam, and Cambodia. Dugong meat is considered a luxury food and is also believed to have aphrodisiac properties. They are actively hunted in these regions, in some places to near-extinction.

In Palau, dugongs were traditionally hunted with heavy spears from canoes. Although it is illegal and there is widespread disapproval of killing dugongs, poaching remains a major problem. Dugongs are also widely hunted in Papua New Guinea, the Solomon Islands, Vanuatu, and New Caledonia; where their meat and ornaments made from bones and tusks are highly prized in feasts and traditional rituals. However, hunting dugongs is considered taboo in some areas of Vanuatu. Dugong meat and oil have traditionally been some of the most valuable foods of Australian Aboriginals and Torres Strait Islanders. Some Aboriginals regard dugongs as part of their Aboriginality.

Local fishermen in southern China traditionally revered dugongs and regarded them as "miraculous fish". They believed it was bad luck to catch them, and they were plentiful in the region before the 1960s. Beginning in the 1950s, a wave of immigrants from other regions that do not hold these beliefs resulted in dugongs being hunted for food and traditional Chinese medicine. This led to a steep decline in dugong populations in the Gulf of Tonkin and the sea around Hainan Island. In Japan, dugongs have been traditionally hunted in the Ryukyu Islands since prehistoric times. Carved ribs of dugongs in the shape of butterflies (a psychopomp) are found throughout Okinawa. They were commonly hunted throughout Japan up until around the 1970s.

Dugongs have also played a role in legends in Kenya, and the animal is known there as the "Queen of the Sea". Body parts are used as food, medicine, and decorations. In the Gulf states, dugongs served not only as a source of food but their tusks were used as sword handles. Dugong oil is important as a preservative and conditioner for wooden boats to people around the Gulf of Kutch in India, who also believe the meat to be an aphrodisiac.

Dugongs have a key role in indigenous marine governance and cultural identity across northern Australia. They are considered part of "sea-country", a living network of relationships linking people, animals, and coastal environments, and contemporary management programs in the Torres Strait and northern Queensland increasingly integrate traditional ecological knowledge with scientific monitoring and co-management arrangements.

== Conservation ==
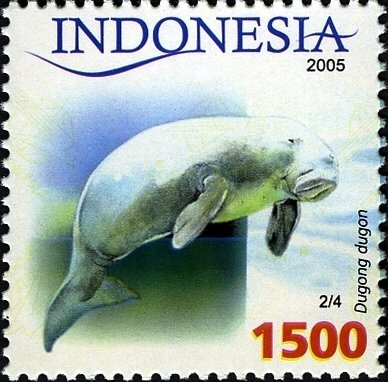
Dugong on a 2005 Indonesian postage stamp

Dugong numbers have decreased in recent times. For a population to remain stable, the mortality of adults cannot exceed 5% annually. The estimated percentage of females humans can kill without depleting the population is 1–2%. This number is reduced in areas where calving is minimal due to food shortages. Even in the best conditions, a population is unlikely to increase more than 5% a year, leaving dugongs vulnerable to over-exploitation. The fact that they live in shallow waters puts them under great pressure from human activity. Research on dugongs and the effects of human activity on them has been limited, mostly taking place in Australia. In many countries, dugong numbers have never been surveyed. As such, trends are uncertain, with more data needed for comprehensive management. The only data stretching back far enough to mention population trends comes from the urban coast of Queensland, Australia. The last major worldwide study, made in 2002, concluded that the dugong was declining and possibly extinct in a third of its range, with unknown status in another half.

The IUCN Red List lists the dugong as vulnerable, and the Convention on International Trade in Endangered Species of Wild Fauna and Flora regulates and in some areas has banned international trade. Most dugong habitats fall within proposed important marine mammal areas. Regional cooperation is important due to the widespread distribution of the animal, and in 1998 there was strong support for Southeast Asian cooperation to protect dugongs. Kenya has passed legislation banning the hunting of dugongs and restricting trawling, but the dugong is not yet listed under Kenya's Wildlife Act as an endangered species. Mozambique has had legislation to protect dugongs since 1955, but this has not been effectively enforced. France has a National Action Plan covering the species, implemented within the Mayotte Marine Natural Park.

Many marine parks have been established on the African coast of the Red Sea, and the Egyptian Gulf of Aqaba is fully protected. The United Arab Emirates has banned all hunting of dugongs within its waters, as has Bahrain. The UAE has additionally banned drift net fishing, and has declared an intention to restore coastal ecosystems dugongs rely on. India and Sri Lanka ban the hunting and selling of dugongs and their products. Japan has listed dugongs as endangered and has banned intentional killing and harassment. Hunting, catching, and harassment are banned by the People's Republic of China. The first marine mammal to be protected in the Philippines was the dugong, although monitoring this is difficult. Palau has legislated to protect dugongs, although this is not well enforced and poaching persists. Indonesia listed dugongs as a protected species in 1999, and in 2018 the Fisheries Ministry began implementing a conservation plan. Protection is not always enforced and souvenir products made from dugong parts can be openly found in markets in Bali. Traditional dugong hunters continued to hunt for many years, and some have struggled to find alternative incomes after ceasing. The dugong is a national animal of Papua New Guinea, which bans all except traditional hunting. Vanuatu and New Caledonia ban the hunting of dugongs. Dugongs are protected throughout Australia, although the rules vary by state; in some areas, indigenous hunting is allowed.

Dugongs are listed under the Nature Conservation Act in the Australian state of Queensland as vulnerable. Most currently live in established marine parks, where boats must travel at a restricted speed and mesh net fishing is restricted. The World Wide Fund for Nature has purchased gillnet licences in northern Queensland to reduce the impact of fishing. In Vietnam, an illegal network targeting dugongs had been detected and was shut down in 2012. Potential hunts along Tanzanian coasts by fishermen have raised concerns as well.

=== Human activity ===
Despite being legally protected in many countries, the main causes of population decline remain anthropogenic and include hunting, habitat degradation, and fishing-related fatalities. Entanglement in fishing nets has caused many deaths, although there are no precise statistics. Most issues with industrial fishing occur in deeper waters where dugong populations are low, with local fishing being the main risk in shallower waters. As dugongs cannot stay underwater for a very long period, they are highly prone to death due to entanglement. The use of shark nets has historically caused large numbers of deaths, and they have been eliminated in most areas and replaced with baited hooks. Hunting has historically been a problem too, although in most areas they are no longer hunted, except in certain indigenous communities. In areas such as northern Australia, hunting has the greatest impact on the dugong population.

Vessel strikes have proved a problem for manatees, but the relevance of this to dugongs is unknown. Increasing boat traffic has increased danger, especially in shallow waters. Ecotourism has increased in some countries, although the effects remain undocumented. It has been seen to cause issues in areas such as Hainan due to environmental degradation. Modern farming practices and increased land clearing have also had an impact, and much of the coastline of dugong habitats is undergoing industrialization, with increasing human populations. Dugongs accumulate heavy metal ions in their tissues throughout their lives, more so than other marine mammals. The effects are unknown.

While international cooperation to form a conservative unit has been undertaken, socio-political needs are an impediment to dugong conservation in many developing countries. The shallow waters are often used as a source of food and income, problems exacerbated by aid used to improve fishing. In many countries, legislation does not exist to protect dugongs, and if it does it is not enforced.

Oil spills are a danger to dugongs in some areas, as is land reclamation. In Okinawa, the small dugong population is threatened by United States military activity. Plans exist to build a military base close to the Henoko reef, and military activity also adds the threats of noise pollution, chemical pollution, soil erosion, and exposure to depleted uranium. The military base plans have been fought in US courts by some Okinawans, whose concerns include the impact on the local environment and dugong habitats. It was later revealed that the government of Japan was hiding evidence of the negative effects of ship lanes and human activities on dugongs observed during surveys carried out off Henoko reef. One of the three individuals has not been observed since June 2015, corresponding to the start of the excavation operations.

=== Environmental degradation ===
If dugongs do not get enough to eat, they may calve later and produce fewer young. Food shortages can be caused by many factors, such as a loss of habitat, death and decline in the quality of seagrass, and a disturbance of feeding caused by human activity. Sewage, detergents, heavy metals, hypersaline water, herbicides, and other waste products all negatively affect seagrass meadows. Human activity such as mining, trawling, dredging, land reclamation, and boat propeller scarring also cause an increase in sedimentation which smothers seagrass and prevents light from reaching it. This is the most significant negative factor affecting seagrass.

Halophila ovalis—one of the dugong's preferred species of seagrass—declines rapidly due to lack of light, dying completely after 30 days. Extreme weather such as cyclones and floods can destroy hundreds of square kilometres of seagrass meadows, as well as wash dugongs ashore. The recovery of seagrass meadows and the spread of seagrass into new areas, or areas where it has been destroyed, can take over a decade. Most measures for protection involve restricting activities such as trawling in areas containing seagrass meadows, with little to no action on pollutants originating from land. In some areas, water salinity is increased due to wastewater, and it is unknown how much salinity seagrass can withstand.

Dugong habitat in the Oura Bay area of Henoko, Okinawa, Japan, is currently under threat from land reclamation conducted by the Japanese Government in order to build a US Marine base in the area. In August 2014, preliminary drilling surveys were conducted around the seagrass beds there. The construction is expected to seriously damage the dugong population's habitat, possibly leading to local extinction.

=== Capture and captivity ===
The Australian state of Queensland has sixteen dugong protection parks, and some preservation zones have been established where even Aboriginal Peoples are not allowed to hunt. Capturing animals for research has caused only one or two deaths; dugongs are expensive to keep in captivity due to the long time mothers and calves spend together, and the inability to grow the seagrass that dugongs eat in an aquarium. Only one orphaned calf has ever been successfully kept in captivity.

As of 2018 only three dugongs are held in captivity worldwide. A female from the Philippines lives at Toba Aquarium in Toba, Mie, Japan. A male also lived there until he died on 10 February 2011. The second resides in Sea World Indonesia, after having been rescued from a fisherman's net and treated. The last one, a male, is kept at Sydney Aquarium, where he has resided since he was a juvenile. Sydney Aquarium had a second dugong for many years, until she died in 2018.

Gracie, a captive dugong at Underwater World, Singapore, was reported to have died in 2014 at the age of 19, from complications arising from an acute digestive disorder.
