= Lampinen =

Lampinen is a Finnish surname. As of 2013, there were almost 10,000 people registered in Finland with this surname. As a surname it appears both as an old, traditional surname in Eastern Finland and as a more, recently adopted surname in Western Finland. Notable people with the surname include:

- Mari Lampinen (born 1971), Finnish biathlete
- Petteri Lampinen (born 1975), Finnish bandy player
- Simo Lampinen (born 1943), Finnish rally driver

== See also ==
- Lampi (surname)
