= Halophila australis =

Conservation status
- Least Concern (IUCN 3.1)

Scientific classification
- Kingdom: Plantae
- Clade: Tracheophytes
- Clade: Angiosperms
- Clade: Monocots
- Order: Alismatales
- Family: Hydrocharitaceae
- Genus: Halophila
- Species: H. australis

Binomial name
- Halophila australis Doty & B.C.Stone

Synonyms
- Halophila ovalis subsp. australis (Doty & B.C.Stone) Hartog

Species of plant

Halophila australis, the paddle weed, is a species of seagrass in the family Hydrocharitaceae, native to southern Australia. Preferring calm waters, it is found on both mud and sand substrates from the low tide mark down to about 23 m (75 ft).
