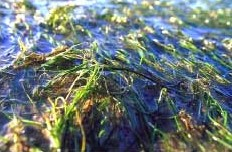

Scientific classification
- Kingdom: Plantae
- Clade: Tracheophytes
- Clade: Angiosperms
- Clade: Monocots
- Order: Alismatales
- Family: Cymodoceaceae
- Genus: Halodule; Endl.

Synonyms
- Diplanthera Thouars 1806 not Gleditsch 1764 (Acanthaceae) nor Banks & Sol. ex R. Br. 1810 (syn of Deplanchea in Bignoniaceae) nor Schrank 1819 (Acanthaceae) nor Raf. 1833 (syn of Platanthera in Orchidaceae)

= Halodule =

Genus of aquatic plants

Halodule is a genus of plants in the family Cymodoceaceae described as a genus in 1841. It is widespread on tropical and semi-tropical ocean shores of all continents except Europe and Antarctica.

== Species ==
Hybridization has been reported in the Pacific between H. pinifolia and H. uninervis.

There are six recognised species:

- Halodule bermudensis - Bermuda
- Halodule ciliata - Panama
- Halodule emarginata - SE Brazil
- Halodule pinifolia - India, Sri Lanka, Southeast Asia, Hainan, Taiwan, Ryukyu Islands, New Guinea, Queensland, Fiji, New Caledonia, Tonga, Caroline Islands
- Halodule uninervis - shores of Indian + Pacific Oceans, Red Sea, Persian Gulf, Bay of Bengal, Papuasia, Queensland, Micronesia
- Halodule wrightii - Atlantic Ocean shores including Caribbean + Gulf of Mexico: Africa (Senegal, Mauritania, Angola), West Indies, South America (Venezuela, Brazil), Mexico, Central America, United States (TX LA MS AL FL NC MD)
