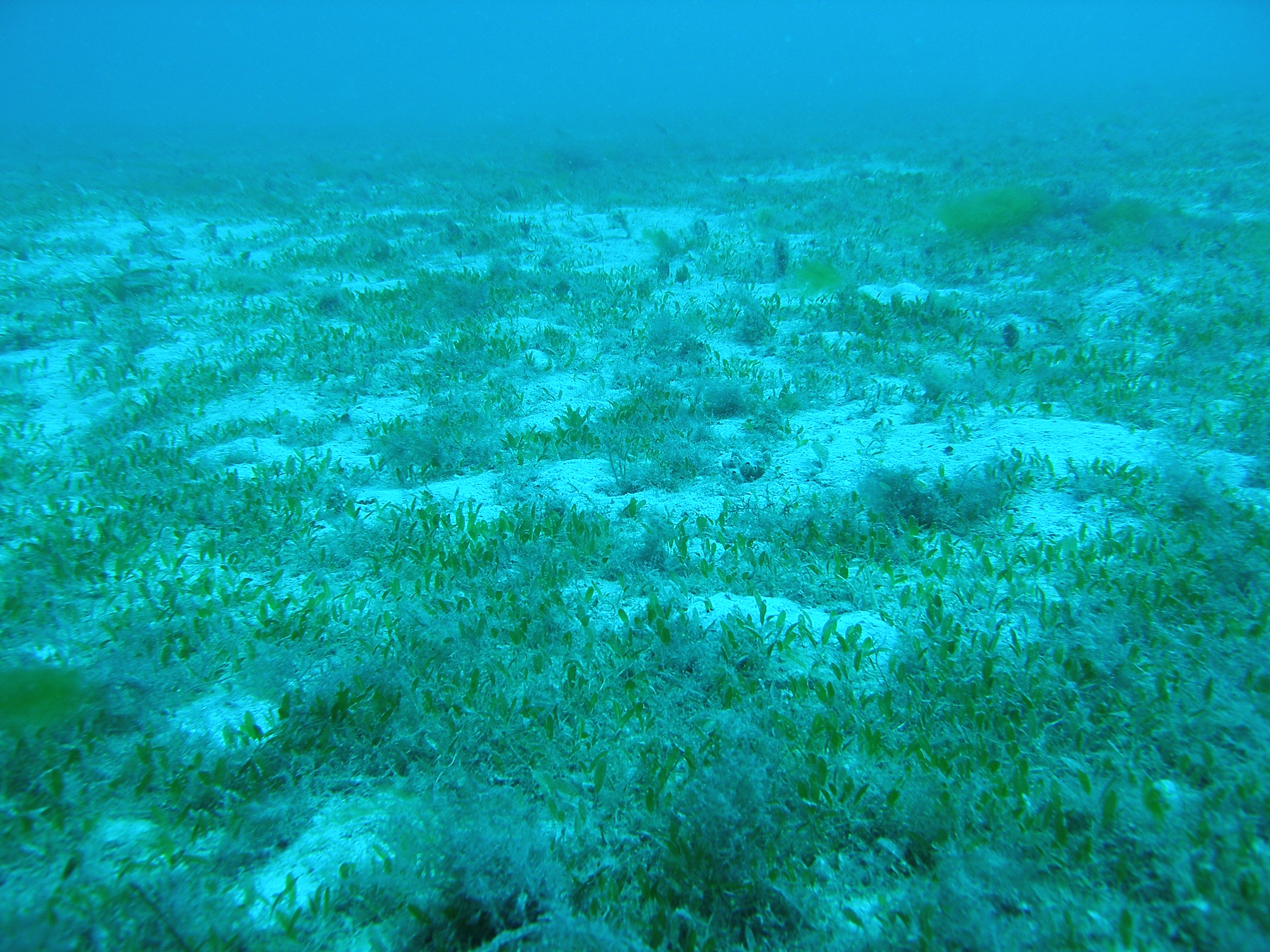

Conservation status
- Least Concern (IUCN 3.1)

Scientific classification
- Kingdom: Plantae
- Clade: Embryophytes
- Clade: Tracheophytes
- Clade: Spermatophytes
- Clade: Angiosperms
- Clade: Monocots
- Order: Alismatales
- Family: Hydrocharitaceae
- Genus: Halophila
- Species: H. decipiens

Binomial name
- Halophila decipiens Ostenf., 1902

= Halophila decipiens =

Species of aquatic plant

Halophila decipiens, commonly known as paddle grass, is a seagrass species found in tropical waters of the Atlantic Ocean, Indo-Pacific, and other parts of the world. It has oval-shaped leaves and grows in short patches on the seafloor that contain extensive root systems underneath. Although its distribution is well-known, its role in marine ecosystems and its modern implications remain understudied.

== Description ==
Halophila decipiens have oval-shaped leaves lined with serrated edges that typically grow to a length of 1-2.5cm. The leaves are covered in minute hairs and stem from rhizomes that create branching networks of these plants on the seafloor. The rhizomes are thin, white, and slightly thicker than the roots of the plant. Unlike other seagrass genera, Halophila species lack basal sheaths, which are casings that wrap around the base of the seagrass stem.

== Distribution ==
Halophila decipiens is one of the only species of seagrass that has a true global distribution, meaning it can be found in shallow waters all over the world. Gene sequencing data shows very little differences in DNA between populations sampled globally, indicating that its dispersal may have occurred recently in the geologic timeline. It is still unknown how Halophila decipiens successfully dispersed on a global scale, but it is thought that the small size of its seeds help for it to become trapped in large drifts of algae or other vegetation as a form of travel.

Although it is found globally, it is most common in subtropical and tropical environments where it creates meadows near reefs or sandy habitat. It grows in water deeper than 50m, except in the areas of southern Australia and southern Mozambique, where it is found near the shallow entrances of open estuaries. Halophila decipiens is a euryhaline species, and can be found in areas with low salinity.

== Reproduction ==
Halophila decipiens are a monoecious species, meaning the male and female flowers occur at the base of the same stem. The male flower develops first, producing pollen with no exine. The female flower develops after, occasionally growing into green fruits containing up to 30 seeds. Flowering occurs in January, followed by fruiting and eventually germination of seeds in the late spring.

== Ecology ==
Seagrass beds act as a habitat and breeding ground for various other organisms. They are an important source of food for sea urchins, sea turtles, parrotfish, and surgeonfish. Halophila decipiens are an ephemeral and annual plant whose population dies in late autumn and recovers with the germination of seeds in the spring. They can often be seen in mixed meadows that also contain Halophila ovalis and Halophila spinulosa.

Halophila decipiens is classified as an invasive species in Hawaii, where it was discovered in 2000 and deemed a threat to the local Halophila hawaiiana seagrass. Due to its global distribution, it is not classified as invasive anywhere else. However, due to its ability to disperse and reproduce easily, it is possible that it outcompetes other seagrass species in some areas and harms their populations.

The dense networks of roots created by Halophila decipiens have been proven to trap microplastics in its roots and the surrounding sediment, creating the possibility of using Halophila decipiens as a natural filter to microplastic pollution in the ocean.

Overall, the role of Halophila decipiens its affects on populations of other seagrass species and its role in marine ecosystems remains relatively understudied.
