= Lampi (surname) =

Lampi is a Finnish surname. Notable people with the surname include:

- Veli Lampi (born 1984), Finnish footballer
- Jussi Lampi (born 1961), Finnish musician and actor
- Mandi Lampi (1988–2008), Finnish actress and singer
- Vilho Lampi (1898–1936), Finnish painter
- Phil Lampi (born 1944), American historian

== See also ==
- Johann Baptist von Lampi the Elder, Austrian painter
- Johann Baptist von Lampi the Younger, Austrian painter
- Lampinen
