= Lanbi Kyun =

Island of Myanmar

Coordinates: 10°50′N 98°15′E

Location of Lanbi Island in Burma

Lanbi Kyun, also Lambi Island and Lampi Island, (Sullivan's Island) is an island in the Mergui Archipelago, Burma. Having an area of 188 km^{2} (73 sq mi), thickly wooded Lanbi is one of the largest islands of the group.

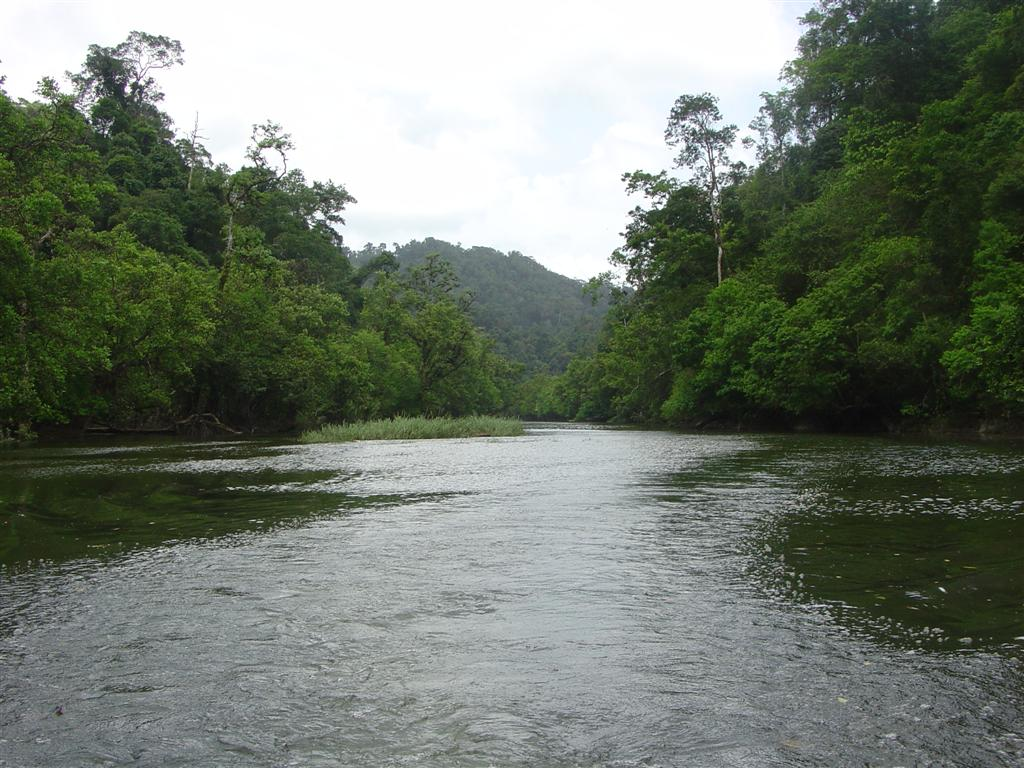
Lanbi Island

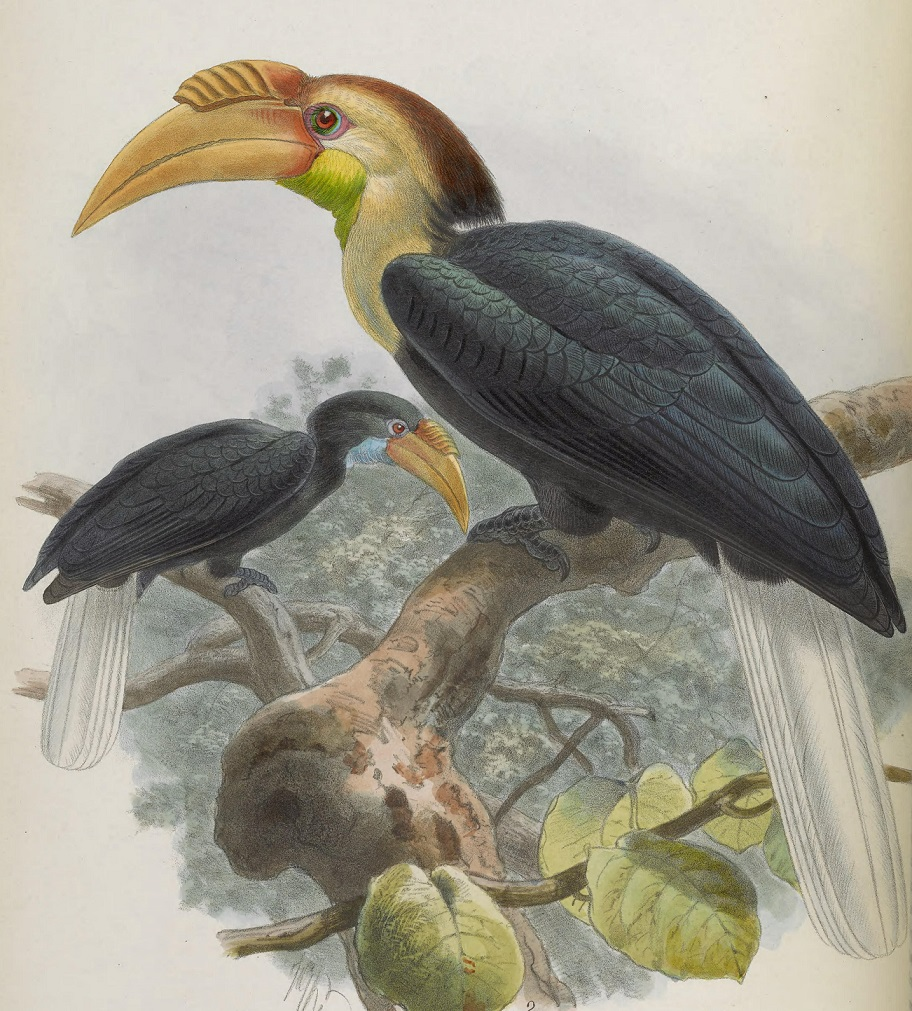
Plain-pouched hornbills live on the island

== Ecology ==
The Lampi Island Marine National Park was designated in 1996.

Unconfirmed reports of the presence of Sumatran rhinoceros on Lanbi have been widely discredited.

=== Important Bird Area ===
The island, along with some adjacent islets, has been designated an Important Bird Area (IBA) by BirdLife International because it supports a population of Vulnerable plain-pouched hornbills.

== 2004 tsunami ==
Some 200 Moken people were found dead on a small island off Lanbi following the 2004 Indian Ocean earthquake and tsunami.
