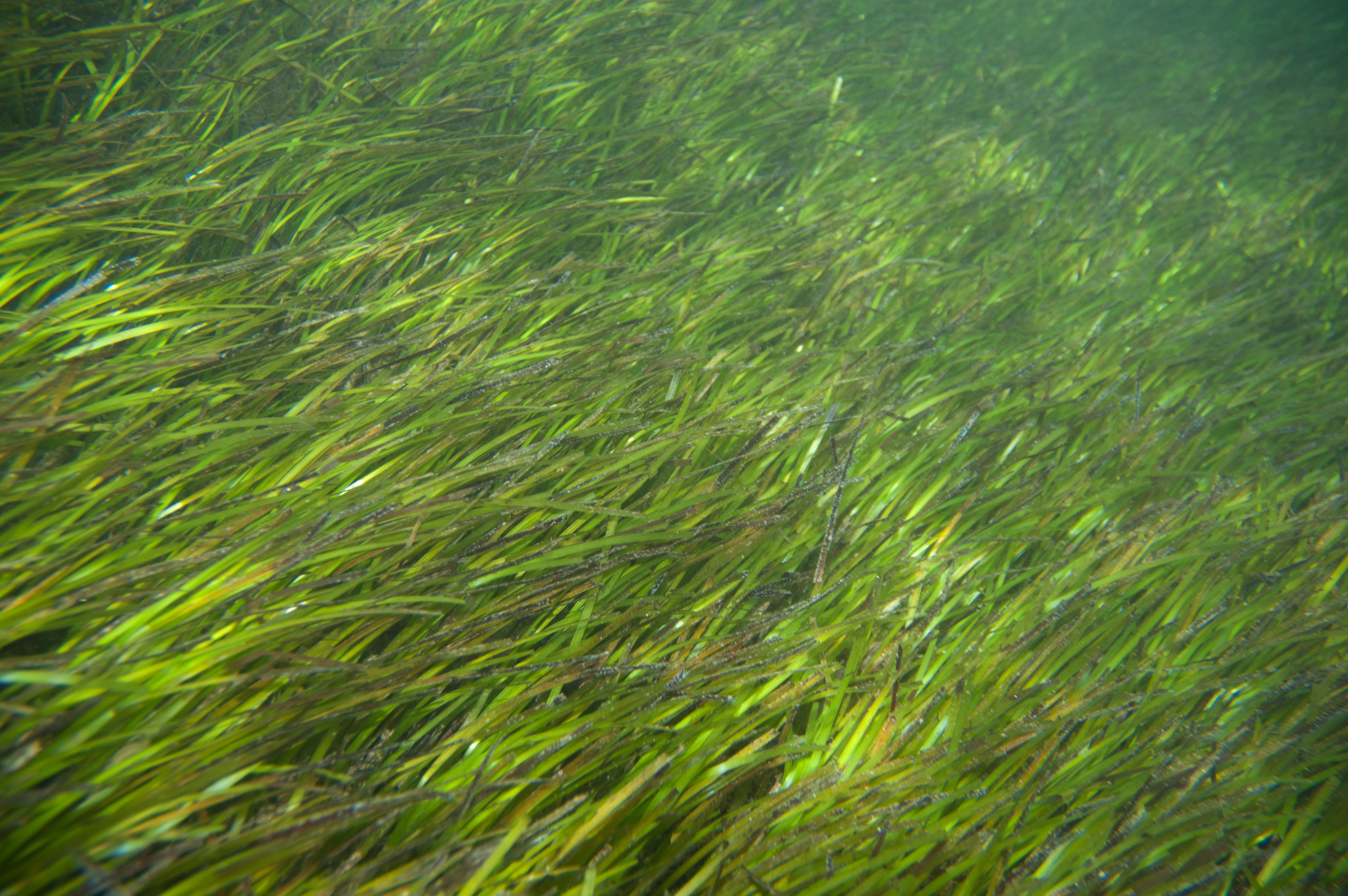

Conservation status
- Least Concern (IUCN 3.1)

Scientific classification
- Kingdom: Plantae
- Clade: Tracheophytes
- Clade: Angiosperms
- Clade: Monocots
- Order: Alismatales
- Family: Cymodoceaceae
- Genus: Halodule
- Species: H. uninervis

Binomial name
- Halodule uninervis (Forssk.) Boiss.

Synonyms
- Cymodocea australis (Miq.) Trimen; Diplanthera indica Steud. Diplanthera madagascariensis Steud. Diplanthera tridentata Steinh. Diplanthera uninervis (Forssk.) F.N.Williams; Halodule australis Miq. Halodule tridentata (Steinh.) Endl. ex Unger; Phucagrostis tridentata Ehrenb. & Hemprich ex Boiss. Zostera tridentata Solms; Zostera uninervis Forssk.

= Halodule uninervis =

Species of plant in the manatee-grass family

Halodule uninervis is a species of seagrass in the family Cymodoceaceae. It is native to the western Pacific and Indian Oceans. Common names include narrowleaf seagrass in English and a'shab bahriya in Arabic.

== Distribution and habitat ==
This is a common plant of the sublittoral zone in its range, growing in depths up to 20 meters in lagoons, on reefs, and in many other types of marine habitat just offshore. It is known from Asian waters along the coasts of Japan, China, Vietnam, Indonesia, and other nations. It occurs on Pacific Islands such as Fiji. It occurs along the Australian Pacific coast, including the Great Barrier Reef. It can be found along Indian Ocean coastal regions from Australia to India to eastern Africa. It is resident in the Red Sea and Persian Gulf.

== Description ==
This species is a flowering plant spreading via a branching rhizome that roots at the nodes. It produces erect stems and alternately arranged leaves. The narrow, toothed leaf blades are up to 15 centimeters (5.9 in) long and usually roughly a millimeter wide, though leaf width is variable and can be up to 7 millimeters. Each leaf has a sturdy sheath up to 3.5 centimeters (1.4 in) long. The tip of the leaf blade has three teeth. Plants of this family are dioecious. The male flower is borne on a short peduncle and is enclosed in a leaf. The tiny anthers are red. The fruit is about 2 millimeters long.

Leaf morphology changes according to habitat type. The leaves are wider in deeper waters. There are apparently two morphs, a narrow leaf and a wide leaf, rather than a continuous range. The narrow leaf type is found closer to shore where it is exposed more often. The wide leaf type is found in deeper areas with cloudier waters. Plants that receive less light may need more leaf blade area to perform enough photosynthesis.

== Biology ==
This grass forms dense carpets or meadows on the substrate, sometimes mixing with other seagrasses and algaes.

It occupies the lower intertidal zone, and it is less tolerant of exposure to air than are plants of the upper intertidal zone such as Thalassia hemprichii. It desiccates quickly. It is also sensitive to ultraviolet radiation. These factors restrict it to deeper intertidal waters than some other plants.

It is a euryhaline species, tolerating a wide salinity range.

== Ecology ==
This species is an important food for the dugong. The grass grows in the Masirah Channel, a waterway between Masirah Island and mainland Oman, where it is an important food for the green sea turtle.

This is a pioneer species. It has been observed on high-sediment, rapidly evolving substrates in Australia and Indonesia.

This species is known to be hybridized to Halodule pinifolia in Okinawa, Japan.

== Conservation ==
This plant is widely distributed and it is common throughout its range. In general its populations are stable, though it may be decreasing in localized areas, such as the coast of Bangladesh, and it fluctuates in some Australian waters. It is affected by some degradation of habitat by forces such as coastal development, siltation, sedimentation, weather events and tidal action, predation, parasites, disease, trawling and other fishing practices, dredging, pollution, eutrophication, and climate change.

Conservation plans are in effect in various regions. Populations are monitored in the United Arab Emirates. It grows within the bounds of several marine parks and reserves in Africa. Populations can be disturbed only with permits in parts of Australia. Large beds are protected in Hat Chao Mai National Park in Thailand.
