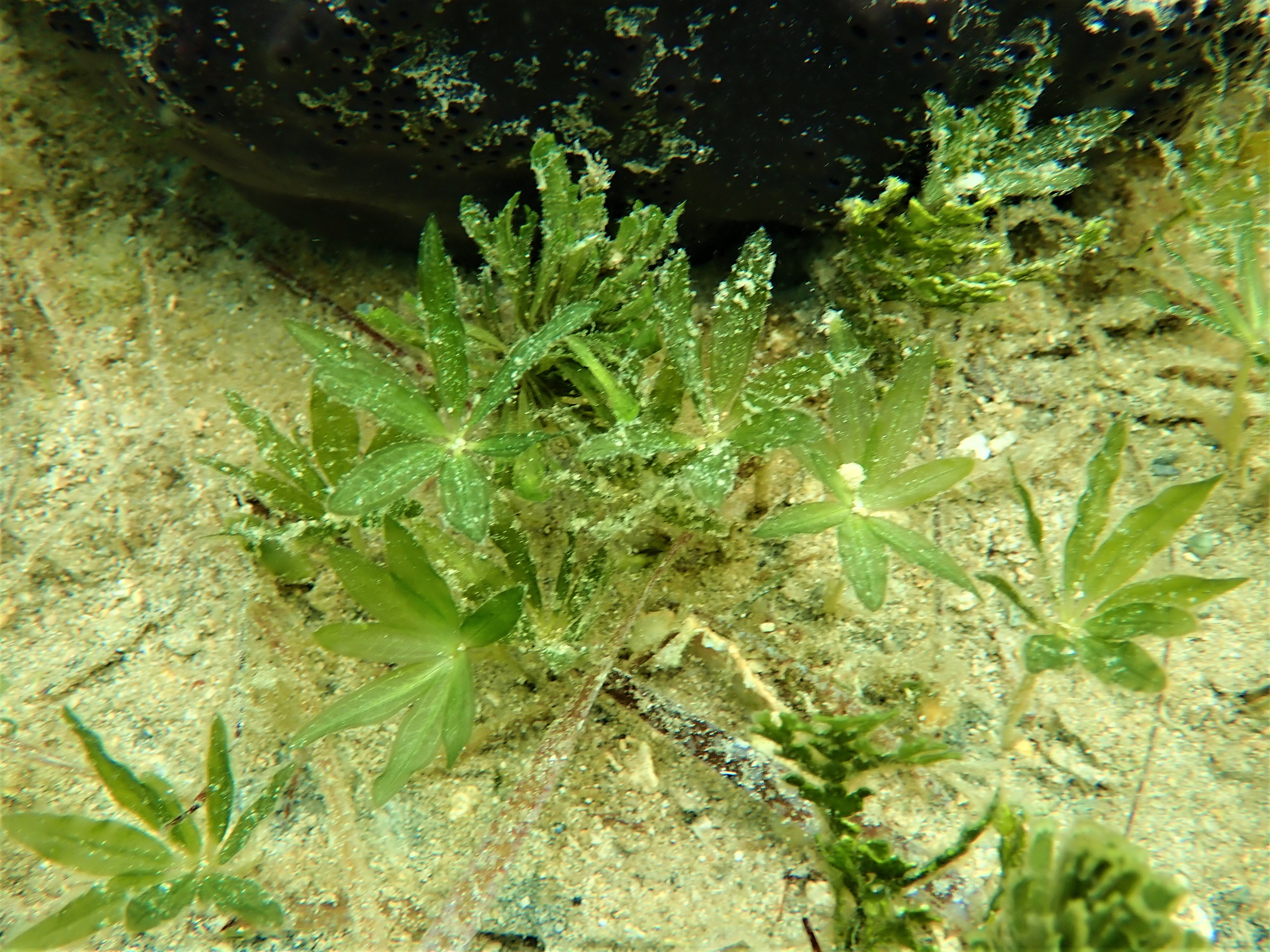
- Halophila engelmannii – Star Grass. Picture taken in Florida's Gulf Coast.

Scientific classification
- Kingdom: Plantae
- Clade: Tracheophytes
- Clade: Angiosperms
- Clade: Monocots
- Order: Alismatales
- Family: Hydrocharitaceae
- Subfamily: Hydrilloideae
- Genus: Halophila; Thouars

Synonyms
- Barkania Ehrenb.; Lemnopsis Zipp. ex Zoll.

= Halophila =

Tape-grasses

Genus of aquatic plants

Halophila is a genus of seagrasses in the family Hydrocharitaceae, the tape-grasses. It was described as a genus in 1806. The number of its contained species, and its own placement in the order Alismatales, has evolved.

== Description ==
These oceanic herbs grow underwater and have creeping stoloniferous stems and leafy nodes. Unlike other seagrasses, the leaves of some species of Halophila do not have basal sheaths (i.e. the bases of the leaves do not wrap around the stem to form a sheath).

The flowers are unisexual. The male flowers are borne on stems. The parts occur in multiples of three along a single row.

The female flowers do not have stalks. They are divided into three segments. The single chambered ovary has a long beak. The three style are long and simple. The ovules are attached on top of three placentas.

The fruit is included in the bract surrounding the inflorescence (the spathe) and crowned by a beak. They have many seeds and thick embryos.

== Distribution ==
This genus is widespread in tropical waters, the distribution range also extends to subtropical and temperate waters primarily the Indian and Pacific Oceans but also the Mediterranean and Caribbean Seas and the Gulf of Mexico. It is found growing off the coasts of Africa, India, Australia and the Pacific Islands.

== Naming ==
The Latin specific epithet halophila refers to salt loving.

== Species ==
Species accepted by the Kew Botanical Garden.

- Halophila australis - southern Australia
- Halophila baillonii - Caribbean, North and South America
- Halophila beccarii - South + East + Southeast Asia
- Halophila capricorni - New Caledonia, islands in Coral Sea
- Halophila decipiens - shores of Indian Ocean and Pacific Ocean; Caribbean, Gulf of Mexico
- Halophila engelmannii - Mexico, Costa Rica, Bahamas, Cayman Islands, Cuba, United States (PR, FL, LA, TX)
- Halophila gaudichaudii - Indian Ocean, western Pacific
- Halophila hawaiiana - Hawaii
- Halophila major - Japan, Taiwan, Southeast Asia, Caroline Is, Sri Lanka
- Halophila mikii - Japan
- Halophila minor - Indian Ocean, western Pacific
- Halophila nipponica (syn. Halophila japonica)- Korea, Japan
- Halophila okinawensis - Nansei-shoto
- Halophila ovalis - Red Sea, Indian Ocean, western Pacific
- Halophila spinulosa - Southeast Asia, North Australia, New Guinea
- Halophila stipulacea - Red Sea, Indian Ocean, invasive in the Caribbean
- Halophila sulawesii - Sulawesi
- Halophila tricostata - Queensland
