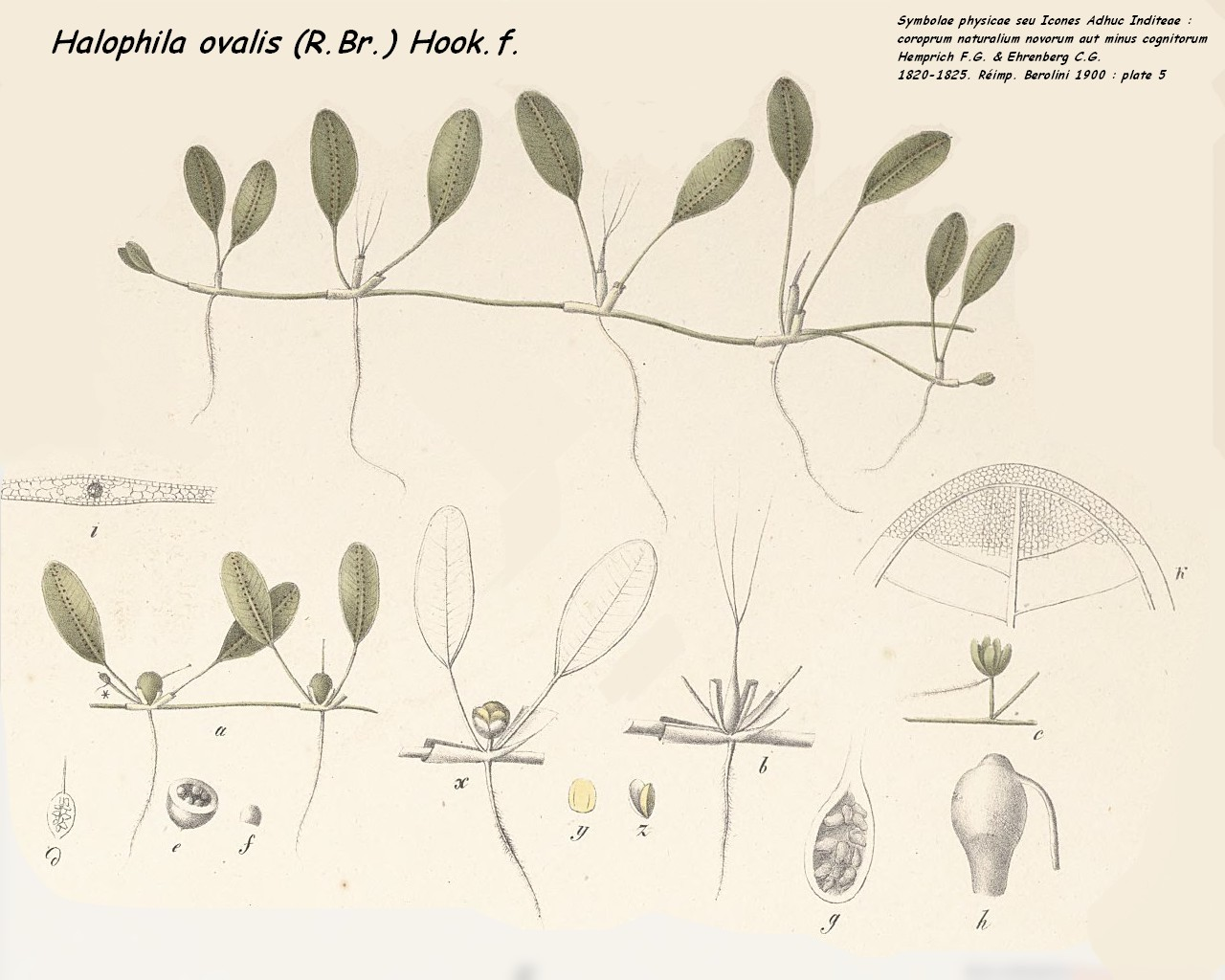

Conservation status
- Least Concern (IUCN 3.1)

Scientific classification
- Kingdom: Plantae
- Clade: Embryophytes
- Clade: Tracheophytes
- Clade: Spermatophytes
- Clade: Angiosperms
- Clade: Monocots
- Order: Alismatales
- Family: Hydrocharitaceae
- Genus: Halophila
- Species: H. ovalis

Binomial name
- Halophila ovalis (R.Br.) Hook.f.

Synonyms
- Halophila ovata

= Halophila ovalis =

Species of aquatic plant

Halophila ovalis, commonly known as paddle weed, spoon grass or dugong grass, is a seagrass in the family Hydrocharitaceae. It is a small herbaceous plant that naturally occurs in sea beds and other saltwater environments in the Indo-Pacific. It was introduced as isolated populations in Florida, Cuba and Antigua.

The first description of the species was by Robert Brown as Caulinia ovalis, this was transferred to the genus Halophila by Joseph Dalton Hooker in Flora Tasmaniae (1858). The species name Halophila ovata is now regarded as a synonym of this species.

The plant occurs around reefs, estuaries, islands, inter-tidal areas, on soft sand or mud substrates. The leaves are ovate in outline, appearing on stems that emerge from rhizome beneath the sand. The roots get up to 800 mm long and covered in fine root hairs. It is often found in meadows that dominate a sand bank or other patch of sea floor. The arrangement of the plant, above and below ground, provides stability to the sea floor and habitat for other species. It is used as food by dugong, as is therefore known as dugong grass.

== Johnson's seagrass ==
A clone of Halophila ovalis known as Johnson's seagrass occurs only on the southeastern coast of Florida. It was formerly treated as the species Halophila johnsonii, a synonym of Halophila ovalis subsp. ovalis.
