= List of Canadian plants by family N =

Main page: List of Canadian plants by family

The following families of vascular plants are listed as occurring in Canada:

For mosses of Canada, see:

== Najadaceae ==
- Najas flexilis — slender naiad
- Najas gracillima — threadlike naiad
- Najas guadalupensis — southern naiad
- Najas marina — holly-leaved naiad

== Neckeraceae ==
- Homalia trichomanoides — lime homalia
- Metaneckera menziesii
- Neckera complanata
- Neckera douglasii
- Neckera pennata
- Neomacounia nitida — Macoun's shining moss

== Nelumbonaceae ==
- Nelumbo lutea — American lotus

== Notothyladaceae ==
- Notothylas orbicularis
- Phaeoceros carolinianus

== Nyctaginaceae ==
- Abronia latifolia — yellow sand-verbena
- Abronia umbellata — beach sand-verbena
- Mirabilis hirsuta — hairy four-o'clock
- Mirabilis linearis — narrow-leaved umbrellawort
- Mirabilis nyctaginea — wild four-o'clock
- Tripterocalyx micranthus — smallflower sand-verbena

== Nymphaeaceae ==
- Nuphar lutea — yellow pond-lily
- Nuphar rubrodisca
- Nymphaea leibergii — dwarf water-lily
- Nymphaea loriana
- Nymphaea odorata — American water-lily
- Nymphaea tetragona — pygmy water-lily

== Nyssaceae ==
- Nyssa sylvatica — black tupelo
