= List of Canadian plants by family X–Z =

Main page: List of Canadian plants by family

The following families of vascular plants are listed as occurring in Canada:

For mosses of Canada, see:

== Xyridaceae ==
- Xyris difformis — Carolina yellow-eyed-grass
- Xyris montana — northern yellow-eyed-grass

== Zannichelliaceae ==
- Zannichellia palustris — horned pondweed

== Zosteraceae ==
- Phyllospadix scouleri — Scouler's surf-grass
- Phyllospadix serrulatus — serrulate surf-grass
- Phyllospadix torreyi — Torrey's surf-grass
- Zostera marina — sea-wrack
