= Flora of Canada =

Plants endemic to Canada

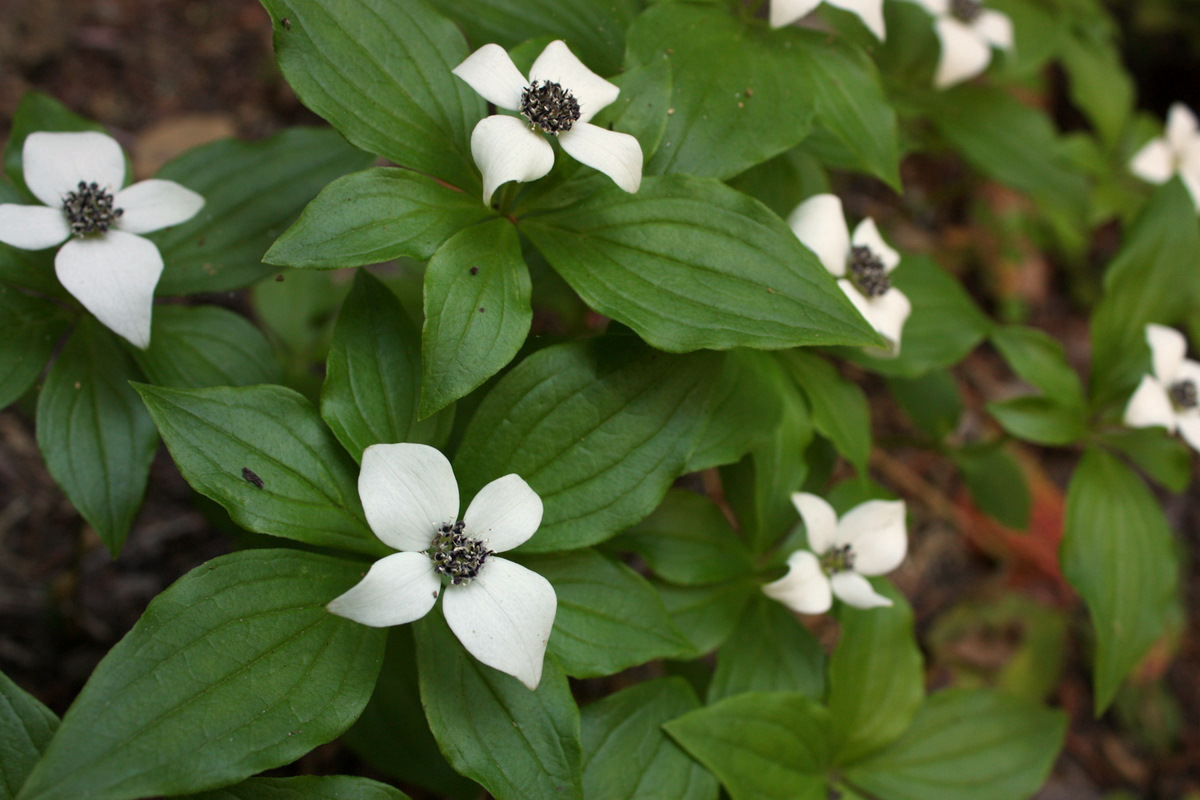
The Canadian bunchberry is found in montane ecosystems and boreal forests, where it grows along the margins of moist woods.

The flora of Canada is quite diverse, due to the wide range of ecoregions and environmental conditions present in Canada. From the warm, temperate broadleaf forests of southern Ontario to the frigid Arctic plains of Northern Canada, from the wet temperate rainforests of the west coast to the arid deserts, badlands and tundra plains, the biodiversity of Canada's plants is extensive. According to environment Canada the nation of Canada hosts approximately 17,000 identified species of trees, flowers, herbs, ferns, mosses and other flora. About 3,322 species of vascular plants are native to Canada, and about 830 additional non-native species are recorded as established outside cultivation there.

== Lists of all plants ==
- List of Canadian plants by family

A | B | C | D | E | F | G | H | I J K | L | M | N | O | P Q | R | S | T | U V W | X Y Z

- List of Canadian plants by genus

A | B | C | D | E | F | G | H | I J K | L | M | N | O | P Q | R | S | T | U V W | X Y Z

== Lists of plant types ==
- Conifers
- Bryophytes
- Trees

== See also ==
- Wildlife of Canada
- Forests of Canada
- List of Wildlife Species at Risk (Canada)
- Invasive species in Canada
- Gypsum flora of Nova Scotia
