= Thamnobryum angustifolium =

Conservation status
- Critically Endangered (IUCN 3.1)

Scientific classification
- Kingdom: Plantae
- Division: Bryophyta
- Class: Bryopsida
- Subclass: Bryidae
- Order: Hypnales
- Family: Neckeraceae
- Genus: Thamnobryum
- Species: T. angustifolium

Binomial name
- Thamnobryum angustifolium (Holt) Crundw.

Species of moss

Thamnobryum angustifolium, the Derbyshire feathermoss, is a species of moss in the Neckeraceae family. It is endemic to Derbyshire, England, being restricted to a single SSSI, where the main colony covers about 3 square metres (32 sq ft) of a single rock face, with small subsidiary colonies nearby. Threats include disturbance from cavers and climbers, collection by bryologists, pollution of the spring in which it grows, and desiccation during periods of drought. Its natural habitat is rivers.

Because of its extreme rarity and localised occurrence, the species has its own individual Biodiversity Action Plan and is included on a list of the world's most threatened bryophytes.

The plant is similar to the common Thamnobryum alopecurum, but can be distinguished from it by the structure of the branch leaves, which are narrower, very strongly toothed, parallel-sided and have a broad nerve. The leaves of T. cataractarum are less strongly toothed but they have an even broader nerve.
