= Noël Martin Joseph de Necker =

Belgian physician and botanist (1730–1793)

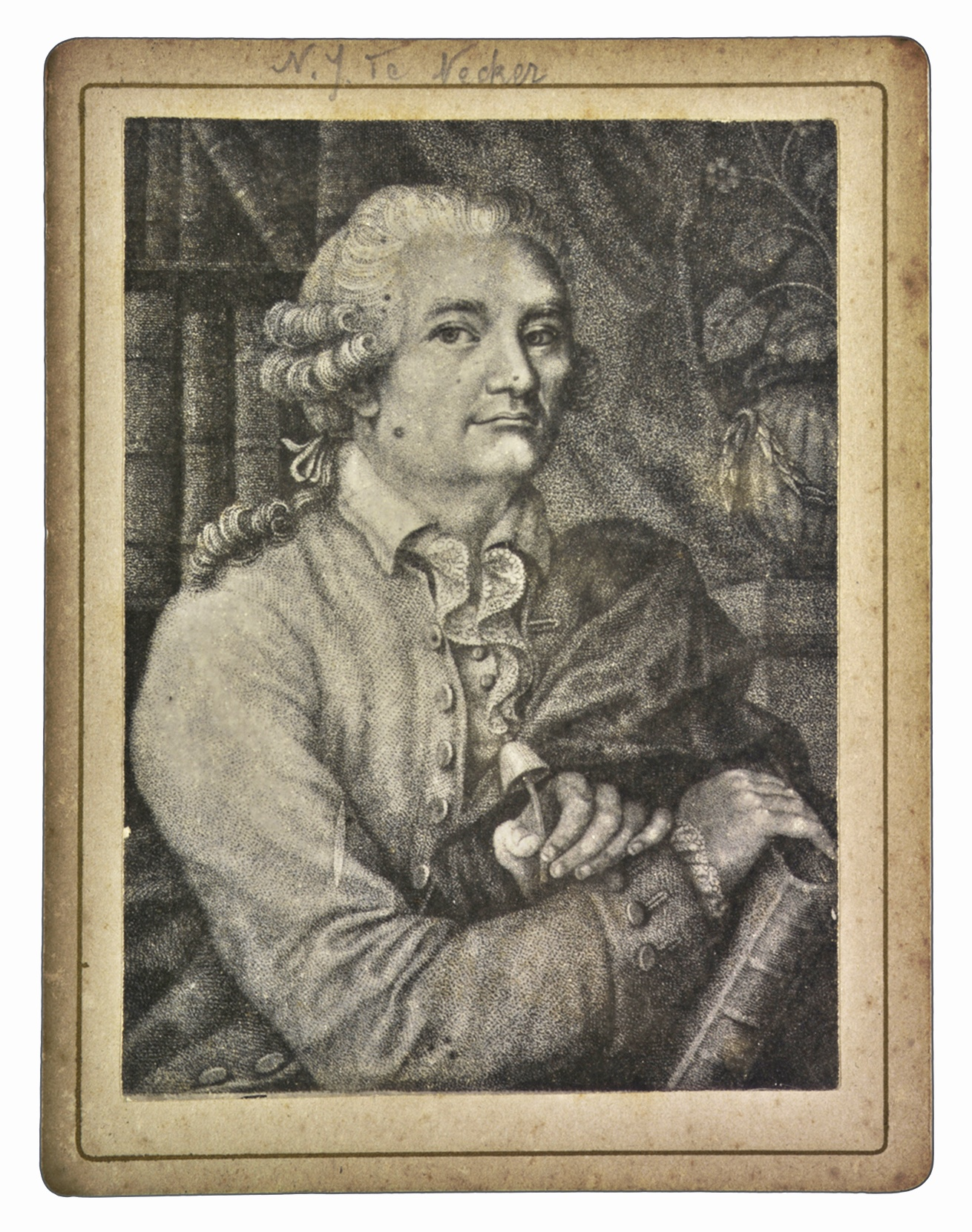
- Necker, by Anton Karcher, 1789
- Born: 25 December 1730; Lille
- Died: 30 December 1793 (aged 63); Mannheim
- Scientific career
- Fields: Botany, Medicine
- Author abbrev. (botany): Neck.

Noël Martin Joseph Necker (25 December 1730 – 30 December 1793) was a German physician and botanist.

== Career ==
Necker was the personal physician to the court of the Electoral Palatinate in Mannheim. His botanical was work involved the study of mosses (Bryophyta) on which he wrote several works, and fungi on which he wrote the Traité sur la mycitologie. He coined several botanical terms, including "sepal" and "achene." He is also known for describing the orchid genus Dactylorhiza.

== Eponyms ==
The moss genus Neckera, and its family, the Neckeraceae were named in his honour.

== Publications ==
- Deliciae gallobelgicae silvestres, seu Tractatus generalis plantarum gallo-belgicarum. 2 vols. 1768
- Methodus Muscorum per Clases, Ordines, Genera (Juniperus dilatata & Juniperus sabina var. tamariscifolia) Necker, Noël Joseph de. Mannheim. 1771
- Physiologia muscorum, per examen analytic Necker, Noël Joseph de. 1774
- Traité sur la mycitologie ou Discours sur les champignons en général… 1774
- Phytozoologie philosophique, dans laquelle on démontre comment le nombre des genres & des especes, concernant les animaux & les vegetaux, a été limité & fixé par la nature. Necker, Noël Joseph de, Societatem Typographycam. 1790
- Corollarum ad Philos, botanicam Linnaei spectans Necker, Noël Joseph de, Neowedae ad Rhenum apud Societaten Typographycam. 1790
- Elementa botanica, genera genuina, species naturales omnium . . . Necker, Noël Joseph de, Societatem Typographycam. 1790

== See also ==
- Category:Taxa named by Noël Martin Joseph de Necker
