= Pinnatella limbata =

Conservation status
- Critically Endangered (IUCN 2.3)

Scientific classification
- Kingdom: Plantae
- Division: Bryophyta
- Class: Bryopsida
- Subclass: Bryidae
- Order: Hypnales
- Family: Neckeraceae
- Genus: Pinnatella
- Species: P. limbata

Binomial name
- Pinnatella limbata Dixon

Species of moss

Pinnatella limbata is a species of moss in the Neckeraceae family. It is endemic to the Uttara Kannada district of Karnataka, India. Its natural habitat is rivers. It is threatened by habitat loss.
