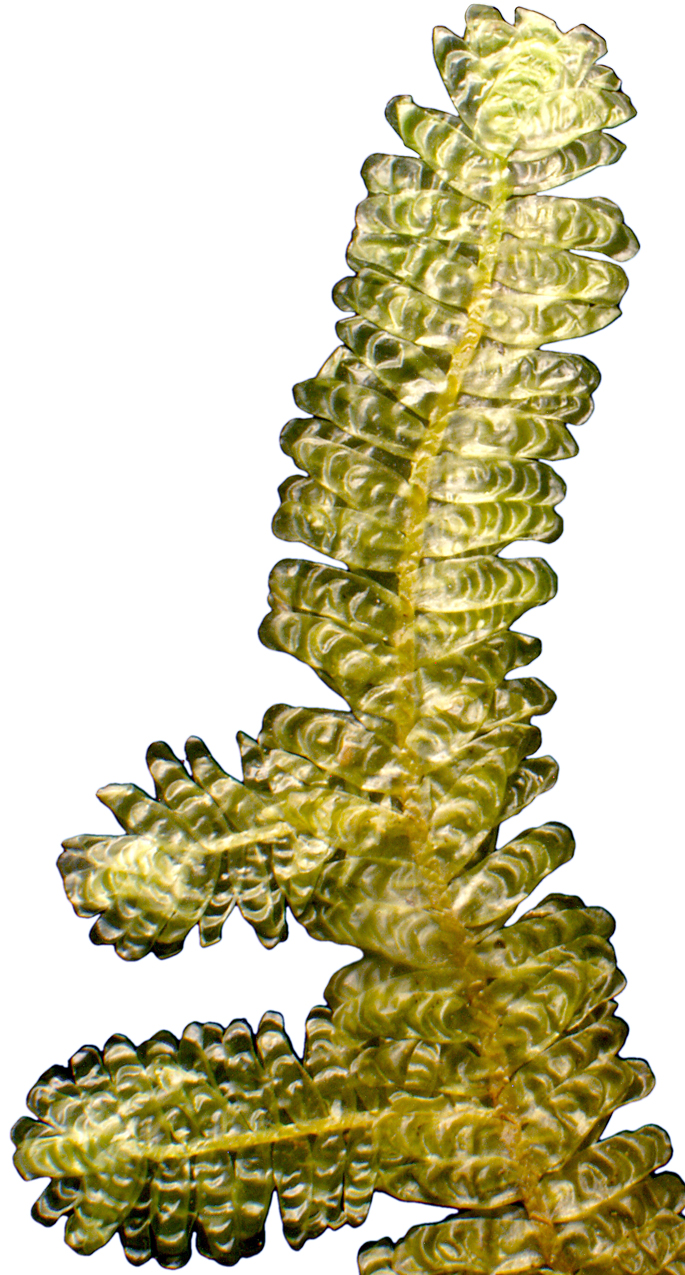
- Neckeropsis lepineana

Scientific classification
- Kingdom: Plantae
- Division: Bryophyta
- Class: Bryopsida
- Subclass: Bryidae
- Order: Hypnales
- Family: Neckeraceae
- Genus: Neckeropsis; Reichardt

= Neckeropsis =

Genus of mosses

Neckeropsis is a genus of plant in the family Neckeraceae.

There are 23 currently accepted species in Neckeropsis. The type species for the genus is Neckeropsis undulata.

== Etymology ==
The name is derived from Neckera, its basionym, and -opsis, meaning "resembles."

== Species ==
The genus Neckeropsis contains the following species:

- Neckeropsis amazonica (Mitt.) M. Fleisch.
- Neckeropsis andamana (Müll. Hal.) M. Fleisch.
- Neckeropsis beccariana (Hampe) A. Touw
- Neckeropsis boiviniana (Müll. Hal. ex Besch.) Cardot
- Neckeropsis boniana (Besch.) A. Touw & Ochyra
- Neckeropsis calcicola Nog.
- Neckeropsis calcutensis (M. Fleisch.) Enroth
- Neckeropsis crinita (Griff.) M. Fleisch.
- Neckeropsis cyclophylla (Müll. Hal.) S. Olsson, Enroth & D. Quandt
- Neckeropsis darjeelingensis Gangulee
- Neckeropsis disticha (Hedw.) Kindb. (neckeropsis moss)
- Neckeropsis exserta (Hook. ex Schwägr.) Broth.
- Neckeropsis fimbriata (Harv.) M. Fleisch.
- Neckeropsis formosica (Broth. & Yasuda) S. Olsson, Enroth, Huttunen & D. Quandt
- Neckeropsis foveolata (Mitt.) Broth.
- Neckeropsis gracilenta (Bosch & Sande Lac.) M. Fleisch.
- Neckeropsis gracilis Nog.
- Neckeropsis inundata (Broth.) Broth.
- Neckeropsis lentula (Wilson) Herzog
- Neckeropsis lepineana (Mont.) M. Fleisch.
- Neckeropsis liliana (Renauld) Paris
- Neckeropsis madecassa (Besch.) M. Fleisch.
- Neckeropsis moutieri (Broth. & Paris) M. Fleisch.
- Neckeropsis nanodisticha (Geh.) M. Fleisch.
- Neckeropsis nitidula (Mitt.) M. Fleisch.
- Neckeropsis obtusata (Mont.) M. Fleisch.
- Neckeropsis pabstiana (Müll. Hal.) Broth.
- Neckeropsis persplendida (Müll. Hal.) Broth. ex Sehnem
- Neckeropsis platyantha (Müll. Hal.) Kindb.
- Neckeropsis pocsii Enroth & Magill
- Neckeropsis pusilla (Mitt.) Broth. ex Paris
- Neckeropsis semperiana (Hampe) A. Touw
- Neckeropsis spuriotruncata (Müll. Hal. ex Dusén) M. Fleisch.
- Neckeropsis submarginata Cardot ex A. Touw
- Neckeropsis takahashii M. Higuchi, Z. Iwats., Ochyra & X.J. Li
- Neckeropsis touwii Ochyra
- Neckeropsis undulata (Hedw.) Reichardt (undulate neckeropsis moss)
- Neckeropsis uruguensis (Müll. Hal.) Hosseus
- Neckeropsis villae-ricae (Besch.) Broth.
