= N. nitida =

N. nitida may refer to:

- Neomacounia nitida, the Macoun's shining moss, an extinct moss species that was found only in a small area of Ontario
- Nitidella nitida, the glossy dove shell, a sea snail species found in the Red Sea and in the Gulf of Mexico, the Caribbean Sea and the Lesser Antilles, and from Florida to Brazil
- Nothofagus nitida, the Coigüe de Chiloé in Spanish, an evergreen tree species native from Chile and probably Argentina

== See also ==
- Nitida (disambiguation)
