= Neckeropsis pocsii =

Conservation status
- Critically Endangered (IUCN 2.3)

Scientific classification
- Kingdom: Plantae
- Division: Bryophyta
- Class: Bryopsida
- Subclass: Bryidae
- Order: Hypnales
- Family: Neckeraceae
- Genus: Neckeropsis
- Species: N. pocsii

Binomial name
- Neckeropsis pocsii Enroth & Magill

Species of moss

Neckeropsis pocsii is a species of moss in the family Neckeraceae that is endemic to Mayotte. It is considered a critically endangered species.

== Distribution and habitat ==
Neckeropsis pocsii is known only from the type location, west of Benara on Grande-Terre, Mayotte, where it grows on boulders in mesic evergreen forest.

== Description ==
Neckeropsis pocsii plants are medium-sized, green in colour, and slightly glossy. They are flattened in habit, similar to Neckeropsis disticha. The rhizoids are brownish-orange in colour, smooth, and sparsely branched. The stems grow to 5–6 cm (2.0–2.4 in) long and 3–4 mm (0.12–0.16 in) wide, with leaves growing to approximately 2.1 mm (0.083 in) by 0.8 mm (0.031 in). The leaves are asymmetric and flattened when damp, becoming twisted when dried out. When in the sporophyte stage, plants produce capsules on upright stalks that grow to 0.8 mm (0.031 in) tall. The capsules are brown and cylindrical, measuring 1.5 mm (0.059 in) by 0.5–0.6 mm (0.020–0.024 in).

== Conservation status ==
Neckeropsis pocsii is listed as critically endangered on the International Union for Conservation of Nature's Red List under criteria B1+2c, based on its extremely limited distribution and the decline of its habitat. It is threatened by excessive logging in the area.
