= Thamnobryum fernandesii =

Conservation status
- Vulnerable (IUCN 3.1)

Scientific classification
- Kingdom: Plantae
- Division: Bryophyta
- Class: Bryopsida
- Subclass: Bryidae
- Order: Hypnales
- Family: Neckeraceae
- Genus: Thamnobryum
- Species: T. fernandesii

Binomial name
- Thamnobryum fernandesii (Sergio) Ochyra

Species of moss

Thamnobryum fernandesii is a species of moss in the family Neckeraceae. It is endemic to Madeira in Portugal, where it is known from just a few locations. It grows in wet habitats, such as waterfalls and drip zones.
