= Thamnobryum alleghaniense =

Scientific classification
- Kingdom: Plantae
- Division: Bryophyta
- Class: Bryopsida
- Subclass: Bryidae
- Order: Hypnales
- Family: Neckeraceae
- Genus: Thamnobryum
- Species: T. alleghaniense

Binomial name
- Thamnobryum alleghaniense (Müll. Hal.) Nieuwl

Species of moss

Thamnobryum alleghaniense, the Allegany thamnobryum moss, is located in temperate regions, mostly in the Northern Hemisphere. This moss has drooping branches at the top of a standing stem, resembling small trees in a micro forest. T. alleghaniense is common on rocks in moist, wet, and shady gorges and ravines. Leaf shape is ovate (-oblong), sometimes lanceolate or ligulate. Seta is 10-25mm. Contain dioecious reproduction, and rarely polyocious.

== Distribution ==
Thamnobryum alleghaniense is native to the United States and Canada. Montane and the southeast North America; Piedmont and upper coastal plain; southern Appalachian Mountains, New Brunswick to Ontario and west across Indiana, Illinois and Missouri, south to Georgia, northern Alabama, northeastern Mississippi and Arkansas (Crum et al. 1981).

== Habitat and ecology ==
Coarse and robust plants, green to brownish collections. Found on wet/ moist rocks in shady environments and especially on the face cliffs. Also found in deep gorges on limestone or more acidic, siliceous rock.
