= Phyllospadix iwatensis =

Iwate surfgrass

Scientific classification
- Kingdom: Plantae
- Clade: Tracheophytes
- Clade: Angiosperms
- Clade: Monocots
- Order: Alismatales
- Family: Zosteraceae
- Genus: Phyllospadix
- Species: P. iwatensis

Binomial name
- Phyllospadix iwatensis Makino, 1931

Species of aquatic plant

Phyllospadix iwatensis is a species of flowering plant in the family Zosteraceae. It is found along the seacoasts of Japan, Korea, China (Hebei, Liaoning, Shandong), and the Russian Far East (Sakhalin, Primorye and the Kuril Islands). It was first discovered in 1929 near on the Miyako Peninsula in Iwate Prefecture in Japan, in northeastern Honshu. It occurs in the intertidal zone along the shore.

Phyllospadix iwatensis is a perennial herb spreading by means of rhizomes. Leaves are long and thin, up to 150 cm long but rarely more than 5 mm across.
