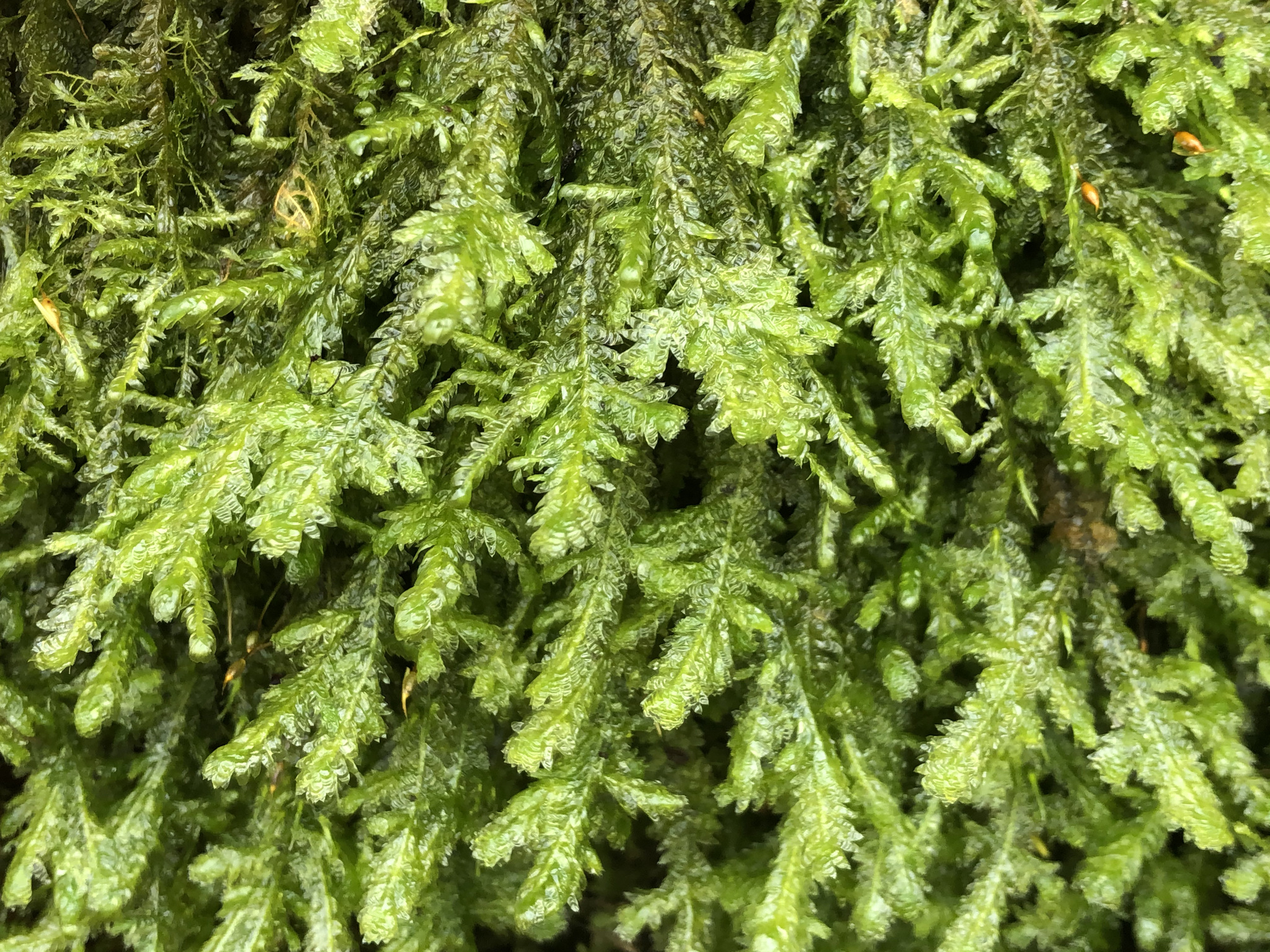
- Exsertotheca crispa

Scientific classification
- Kingdom: Plantae
- Division: Bryophyta
- Class: Bryopsida
- Subclass: Bryidae
- Order: Hypnales
- Family: Neckeraceae
- Genus: Exsertotheca; S.Olsson, Enroth & D.Quandt

= Exsertotheca =

Genus of mosses

Exsertotheca is a genus of mosses belonging to the family Neckeraceae.

Species:

- Exsertotheca baetica (J.Guerra, J.F.Jiménez & J.A.Jiménez) Draper, González-Mancebo, O.Werner, J.Patiño & Ros
- Exsertotheca crispa (Hedw.) S. Olsson, Enroth & D. Quandt
- Exsertotheca intermedia (Brid.) S.Olsson, Enroth & D.Quandt
