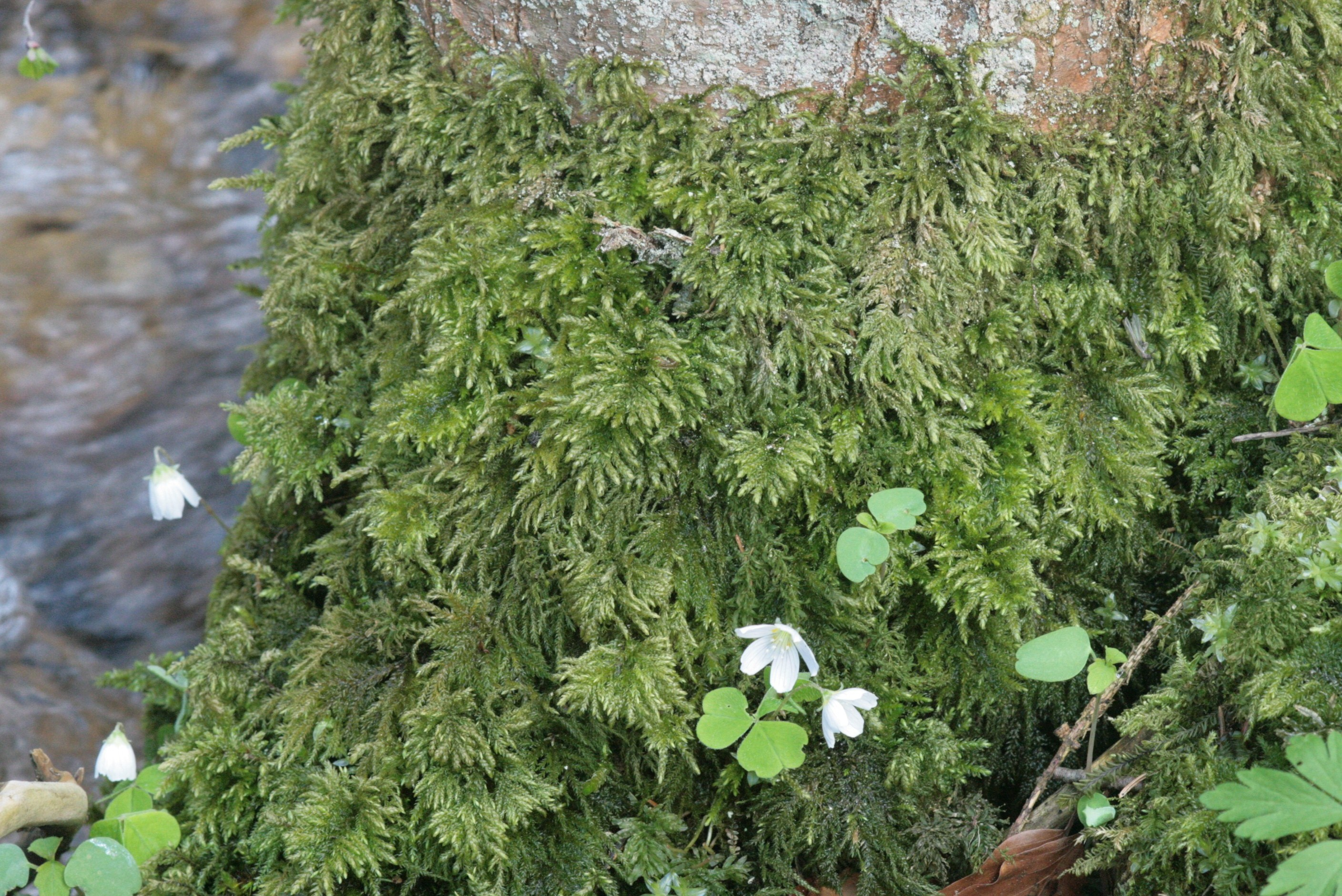
- Thamnobryum alopecurum

Scientific classification
- Kingdom: Plantae
- Division: Bryophyta
- Class: Bryopsida
- Subclass: Bryidae
- Order: Hypnales
- Family: Neckeraceae
- Genus: Thamnobryum; Nieuwl.

= Thamnobryum =

Genus of mosses

Thamnobryum is a genus of moss in the family Neckeraceae. There are about 50 species. The genus is distributed throughout the world.

== Species ==
The genus Thamnobryum contains the following species:

- Thamnobryum alleghaniense (Müll. Hal.) Nieuwl.
- Thamnobryum alopecurum (Hedw.) Nieuwl. ex Gangulee
- Thamnobryum aneitense (Mitt.) W. Schultze-Motel
- Thamnobryum angustifolium (Holt) Nieuwl.
- Thamnobryum arbusculosum (Müll. Hal. ex Thér.) H.A. Mill., H. Whittier & B. Whittier
- Thamnobryum assimile (Broth.) Sérgio
- Thamnobryum canariense (Renauld & Cardot) D.G. Long
- Thamnobryum capense (Broth. & Dixon) Enroth
- Thamnobryum caroli (Broth.) H. Rob.
- Thamnobryum cataractarum N. Hodgetts & Blockeel
- Thamnobryum ceylonense (M. Fleisch.) Enroth
- Thamnobryum confertum (Mitt.) H. Rob.
- Thamnobryum coreanum (Cardot) Nog. & Z. Iwats.
- Thamnobryum corticola (Kindb.) De Sloover
- Thamnobryum crassinervium (Broth.) S. He
- Thamnobryum ellipticum (Bosch & Sande Lac.) Nieuwl.
- Thamnobryum fasciculatum (Sw. ex Hedw.) I. Sastre
- Thamnobryum fernandesii Sérgio
- Thamnobryum fruticosum (Mitt.) Gangulee
- Thamnobryum grandirete (Broth. & M. Yasuda) Nog. & Z. Iwats.
- Thamnobryum hispidum (Hook. f. & Wilson) M. Stech, Sim-Sim, Tangney & D. Quandt
- Thamnobryum incurvum (Nog.) Nog. & Z. Iwats.
- Thamnobryum ingae (Broth.) H. Rob.
- Thamnobryum latifolium (Bosch & Sande Lac.) Nieuwl.
- Thamnobryum latinerve (Mitt.) Ochyra
- Thamnobryum liesneri B.H. Allen & S.P. Churchill
- Thamnobryum macrocarpum (Brid.) Gangulee
- Thamnobryum maderense (Kindb.) Hedenäs
- Thamnobryum malgachum (Cardot) O'Shea
- Thamnobryum marginatum (Jovet-Ast & Huard) Enroth
- Thamnobryum microalopecurum (Kindb.) Nieuwl.
- Thamnobryum neckeroides (Hook.) E. Lawton
- Thamnobryum negrosense (E.B. Bartram) Z. Iwats. & B.C. Tan
- Thamnobryum obtusatum (Lindb. & Arnell) Bard. & Czerd.
- Thamnobryum pandum (Hook. f. & Wilson) I.G. Stone & G.A.M. Scott
- Thamnobryum parvulum (Mitt.) R.S. Chopra
- Thamnobryum pendulirameum (Müll. Hal.) S. He
- Thamnobryum planifrons (Broth. & M. Yasuda) Nog. & Z. Iwats.
- Thamnobryum plicatulum (Sande Lac.) Z. Iwats.
- Thamnobryum proboscideum (Broth.) H. Rob.
- Thamnobryum pumilum (Hook. & Wilson) B.C. Tan
- Thamnobryum quisumbingii (Veloira) Z. Iwats. & B.C. Tan
- Thamnobryum rigidum (Mitt.) H. Rob.
- Thamnobryum rudolphianum Mastracci
- Thamnobryum schmidii (Müll. Hal.) R.S. Chopra
- Thamnobryum siamense (Horik. & Ando) Nog.
- Thamnobryum speciosum (Broth.) Hoe
- Thamnobryum sublatifolium (Dixon) W. Schultze-Motel
- Thamnobryum subseriatum (Mitt. ex Sande Lac.) B.C. Tan
- Thamnobryum subserratum (Hook. ex Harv.) Nog. & Z. Iwats.
- Thamnobryum tumidicaule (K.A. Wagner) F.D. Bowers
- Thamnobryum tumidum (Nog.) Nog. & Z. Iwats.
- Thamnobryum umbrosum (Mitt.) M. Stech, Sim-Sim, Tangney & D. Quandt
- Thamnobryum vorobjovii (Lazarenko) Ochyra
