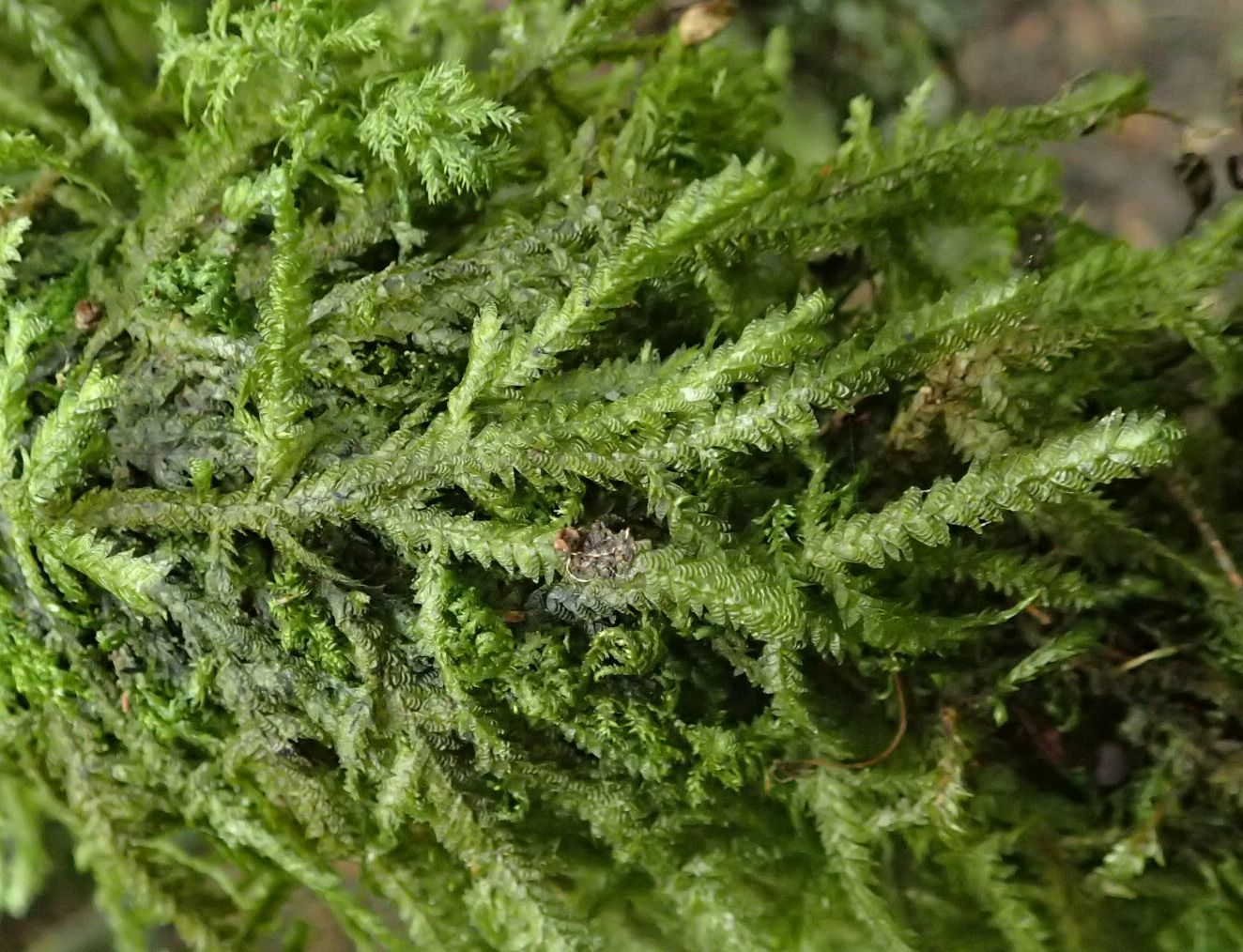
- Alleniella hymenodonta

Scientific classification
- Kingdom: Plantae
- Division: Bryophyta
- Class: Bryopsida
- Subclass: Bryidae
- Order: Hypnales
- Family: Neckeraceae
- Genus: Alleniella; S.Olsson, Enroth & D.Quandt

= Alleniella =

Genus of mosses

Alleniella is a genus of mosses belonging to the family Neckeraceae.

The genus was first described by S.Olsson, Enroth and D. Quandt in 2011.

== Taxonomy ==
The genus name of Alleniella is in honour of Bruce Hampton Allen (b. 1952), American bryologist. It was published in Taxon Vol.60 (Issue 1) on page 45 in 2011.

== Species ==
The following species are recognised in the genus Alleniella:

- Alleniella besseri (Lobarzewski) S. Olsson, Enroth & D. Quandt
- Alleniella brownii (Dixon) S. Olsson, Enroth & D. Quandt
- Alleniella chilensis (Schimp. ex Mont.) S. Olsson, Enroth & D. Quandt
- Alleniella complanata (Hedw.) S. Olsson, Enroth & D. Quandt
- Alleniella hymenodonta (Müll. Hal.) S. Olsson, Enroth & D. Quandt
- Alleniella remota (Bruch & Schimp. ex Müll. Hal.) S. Olsson, Enroth & D. Quandt
- Alleniella scabridens (Müll. Hal.) S. Olsson, Enroth & D. Quandt
- Alleniella submacrocarpa (Dixon) S. Olsson, Enroth & D. Quandt
- Alleniella urnigera (Müll. Hal.) S. Olsson, Enroth & D. Quandt
- Alleniella valentiniana (Besch.) S. Olsson, Enroth & D. Quandt
