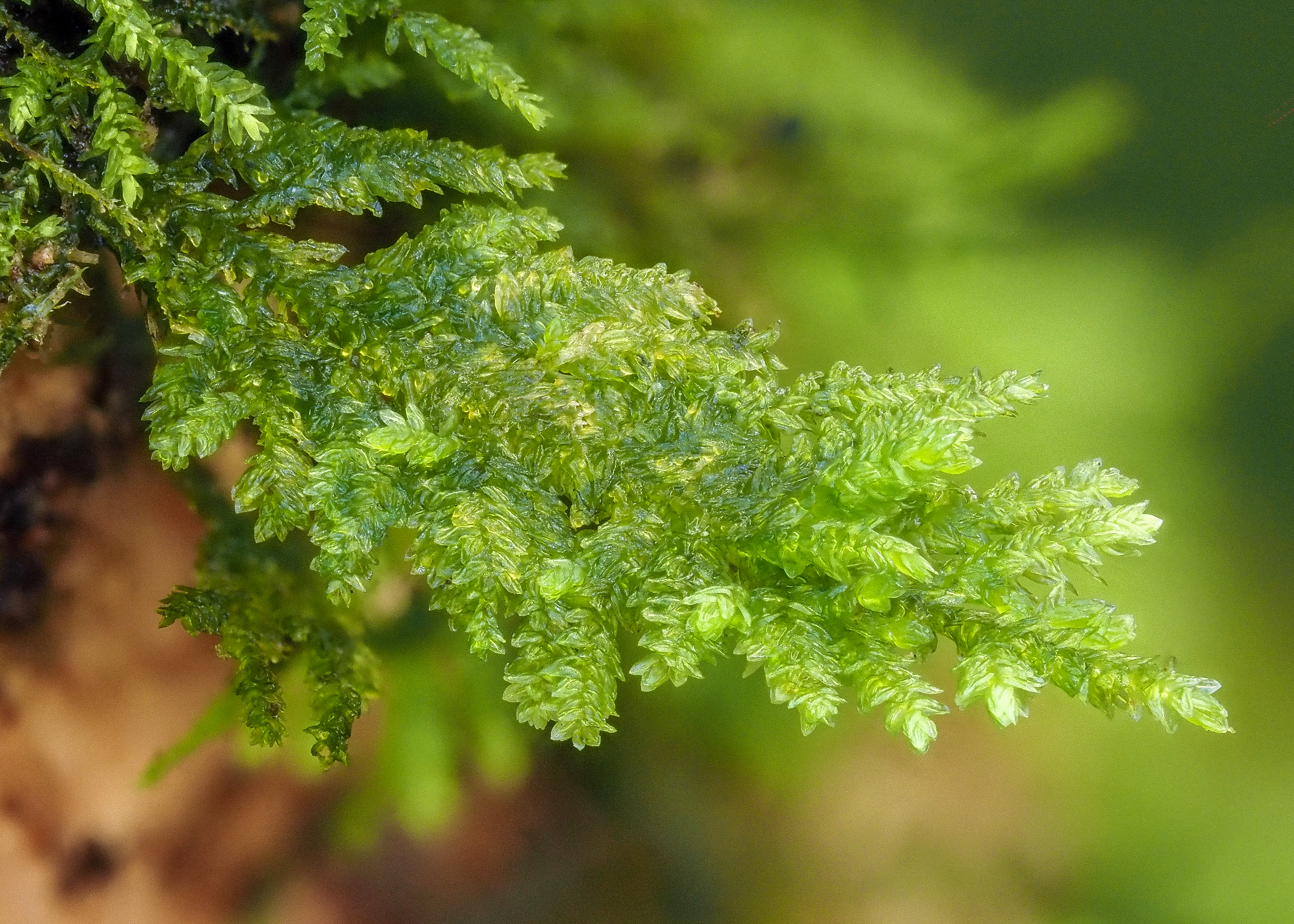
- Pinnatella minuta

Scientific classification
- Kingdom: Plantae
- Clade: Embryophytes
- Division: Bryophyta
- Class: Bryopsida
- Subclass: Bryidae
- Order: Hypnales
- Family: Neckeraceae
- Genus: Pinnatella; M.Fleisch.

= Pinnatella =

Genus of mosses

Pinnatella is a genus of mosses in the family Neckeraceae.

== Species ==
The genus Pinnatellat contains the following species (but this list may be incomplete):

- Pinnatella africana (Welw. & Duby) Broth.
- Pinnatella alopecuroides (Mitt.) M. Fleisch.
- Pinnatella ambigua (Bosch & Sande Lac.) M. Fleisch.
- Pinnatella amblyphylla Enroth
- Pinnatella anacamptolepis (Müll. Hal.) Broth.
- Pinnatella angustinervis Dixon
- Pinnatella braunii (Broth.) M. Fleisch.
- Pinnatella caesia (Mitt.) Broth.
- Pinnatella calcutensis M. Fleisch.
- Pinnatella callicostelloides (Broth. ex Thér.) Broth.
- Pinnatella chalaropteris (Müll. Hal. ex Dusén) Broth.
- Pinnatella donghamensis (Besch.) Ninh
- Pinnatella dupuisii (Renauld & Cardot) Broth.
- Pinnatella elegantissima (Mitt.) M. Fleisch.
- Pinnatella engleri (Broth.) M. Fleisch.
- Pinnatella filifera (Mitt.) M. Fleisch.
- Pinnatella flagellacea (Mitt.) Broth.
- Pinnatella foreauana Thér. & P. de la Varde
- Pinnatella fuciformis (Brid.) A. Touw
- Pinnatella geheebii (Müll. Hal.) M. Fleisch.
- Pinnatella globiglossa (Müll. Hal.) Broth. ex Paris
- Pinnatella gollanii Broth.
- Pinnatella herpetineura (Besch.) Kindb. ex Paris
- Pinnatella homaliadelphoides Enroth, S. Olsson, S. He, Shevock & D. Quandt
- Pinnatella integerrima (Broth.) Broth.
- Pinnatella kuehliana (Bosch & Sande Lac.) M. Fleisch.
- Pinnatella kurzii (Kindb.) Wijk & Margad.
- Pinnatella laxa (Bosch & Sande Lac.) Paris
- Pinnatella ligulifera (Bosch & Sande Lac.) M. Fleisch.
- Pinnatella limbata Dixon
- Pinnatella makinoi (Broth.) Broth.
- Pinnatella mariei (Besch.) Broth.
- Pinnatella mayumbensis (Besch.) M. Fleisch.
- Pinnatella minuta (Mitt.) Broth.
- Pinnatella mixta (Müll. Hal.) Broth. ex Paris
- Pinnatella mucronata (Bosch & Sande Lac.) M. Fleisch.
- Pinnatella nana (R.S. Williams) E.B. Bartram
- Pinnatella oblongifrondea (Broth.) Broth.
- Pinnatella pechuelii (Müll. Hal.) Broth.
- Pinnatella piniformis (Brid.) M. Fleisch.
- Pinnatella robusta Nog.
- Pinnatella rotundifrondea (Müll. Hal.) M. Fleisch.
- Pinnatella scaberula (Renauld & Cardot) M. Fleisch.
- Pinnatella siamensis (Horik. & Ando) Nog.
- Pinnatella stoloniramea (Müll. Hal. ex Dusén) Broth. ex Paris
- Pinnatella taiwanensis Nog.
- Pinnatella tamariscina (Hampe) Broth.
- Pinnatella thieleana (Müll. Hal.) Broth. ex Paris
- Pinnatella uroclada (Mitt.) Enroth
- Pinnatella usagara (Mitt.) Broth.
