= Phyllospadix juzepczukii =

Okhotsk surfgrass

Scientific classification
- Kingdom: Plantae
- Clade: Tracheophytes
- Clade: Angiosperms
- Clade: Monocots
- Order: Alismatales
- Family: Zosteraceae
- Genus: Phyllospadix
- Species: P. juzepczukii

Binomial name
- Phyllospadix juzepczukii Tzvelev, 1981

Species of aquatic plant

Phyllospadix juzepczukii is a plant species known only from shores of the Russian Far East (Sakhalin, Khabarovsk and Primorye). It grows in salt marshes along the intertidal zones of the Sea of Okhotsk.
