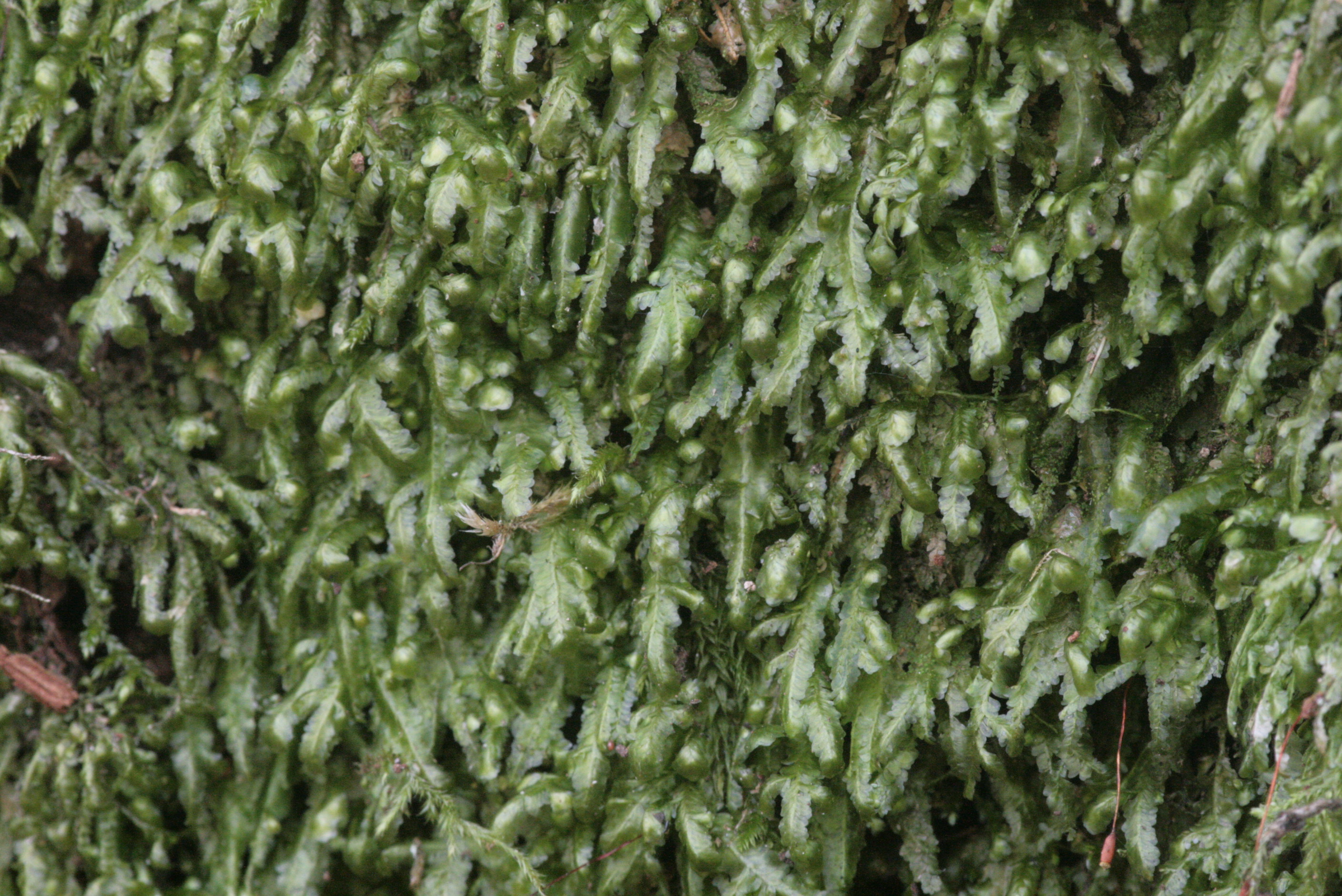
- Homalia trichomanoides

Scientific classification
- Kingdom: Plantae
- Division: Bryophyta
- Class: Bryopsida
- Subclass: Bryidae
- Order: Hypnales
- Family: Neckeraceae
- Genus: Homalia; Bridel, 1827

Species
- Homalia glabella; Homalia lusitanica; Homalia pennatula; Homalia sakontala; Homalia trichomanoides; Homalia webbiana

= Homalia =

Genus of mosses

Homalia is a genus of mosses in the family Neckeraceae.
