= Phyllospadix japonicus =

Conservation status
- Endangered (IUCN 3.1)

Scientific classification
- Kingdom: Plantae
- Clade: Tracheophytes
- Clade: Angiosperms
- Clade: Monocots
- Order: Alismatales
- Family: Zosteraceae
- Genus: Phyllospadix
- Species: P. japonicus

Binomial name
- Phyllospadix japonicus Makino, 1897

Species of aquatic plant

Phyllospadix japonicus, known as Asian surfgrass, is a species of flowering plant in the family Zosteraceae. It is found along the seacoasts of Japan, Korea, and China (Hebei, Liaoning, Shandong). It grows in the intertidal zone along the shore.

Phyllospadix japonicus is a perennial herb that spreads by means of rhizomes. Its leaves are long, reaching up to 100 cm, though they are rarely more than 2.5 mm wide.
