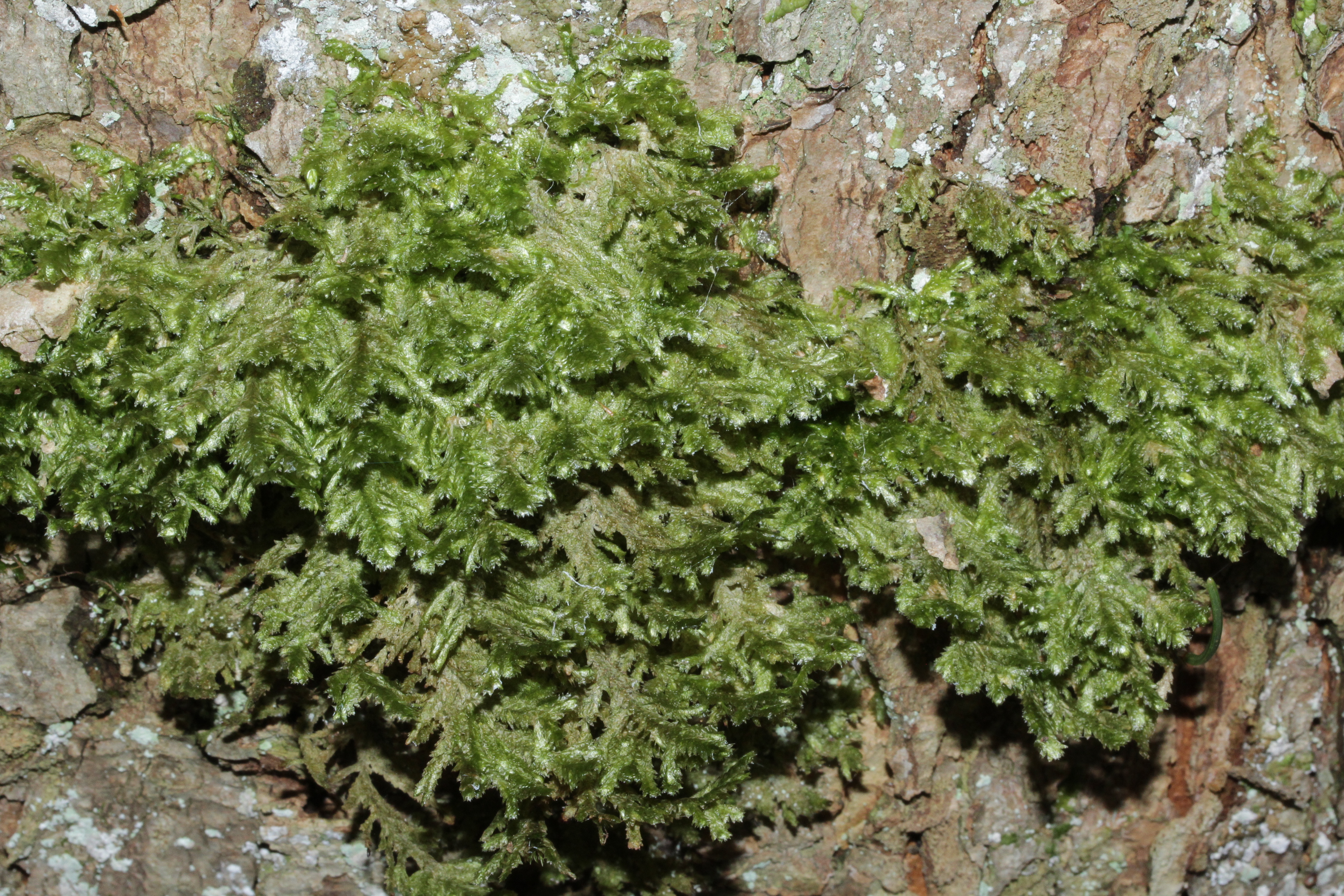

Scientific classification
- Kingdom: Plantae
- Division: Bryophyta
- Class: Bryopsida
- Subclass: Bryidae
- Order: Hypnales
- Family: Neckeraceae
- Genus: Neckera
- Species: N. pennata

Binomial name
- Neckera pennata Hedwig, 1801

= Neckera pennata =

Species of moss

Neckera pennata is a species of moss belonging to the family Neckeraceae.

It has a cosmopolitan distribution. Feather flat moss can be an indicator of late successional and old-growth hardwood forests, because it usually grows on sugar maples in the Northeast that are at least 120 years old.
