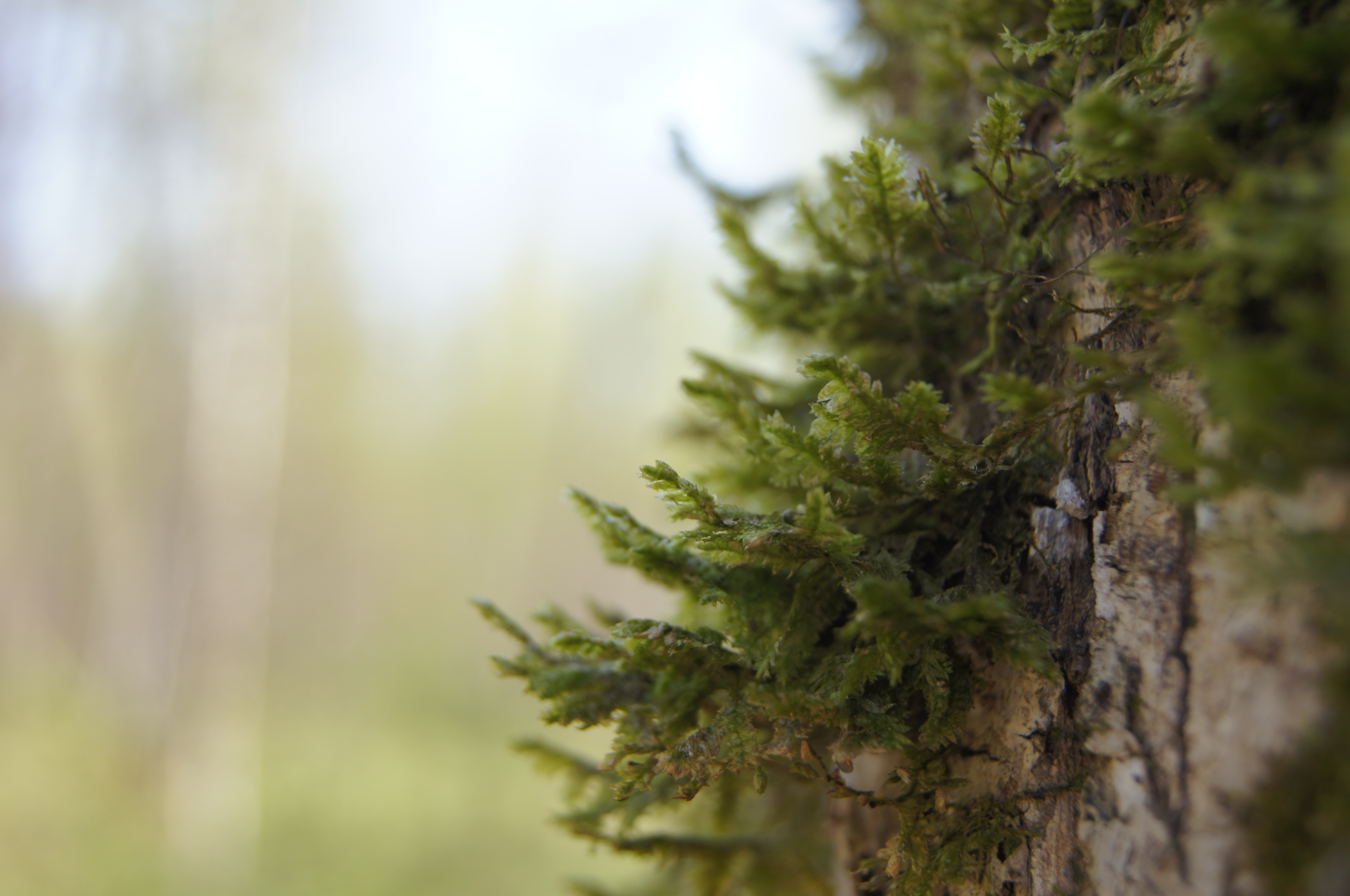
- Neckera pennata

Scientific classification
- Kingdom: Plantae
- Division: Bryophyta
- Class: Bryopsida
- Subclass: Bryidae
- Order: Hypnales
- Family: Neckeraceae
- Genus: Neckera; Hedw.

Species
- See text.

Synonyms
- Paraphysanthus Spruce; Rhystophyllum Ehrh. ex E.Britton

= Neckera =

Genus of mosses

Neckera is a large genus of mosses belonging to the family Neckeraceae. The genus was first described by Johann Hedwig. The genus has a cosmopolitan distribution.

== Description ==
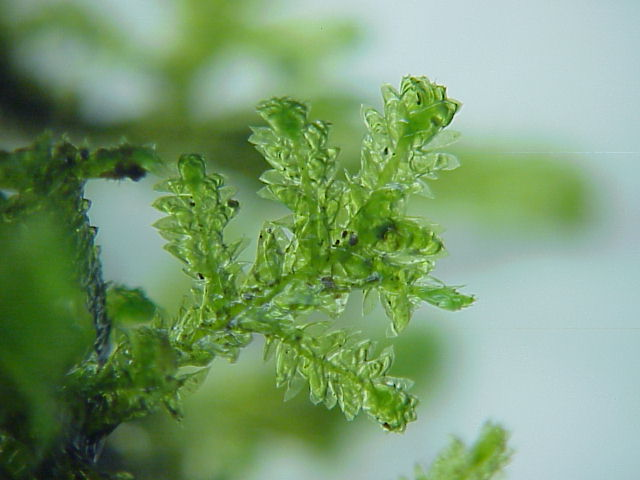
Close up showing the gametophye of Neckera crispa.

=== Gametophyte ===
Medium-sized to large mosses that form shelf growth forms. They are light to dark green in colour, or sometimes yellowish. They tend to be shiny.

The creeping stems are irregularly branched. Paraphyllia (the trichome-like or foliose structures on moss stem surfaces) may be present or absent.

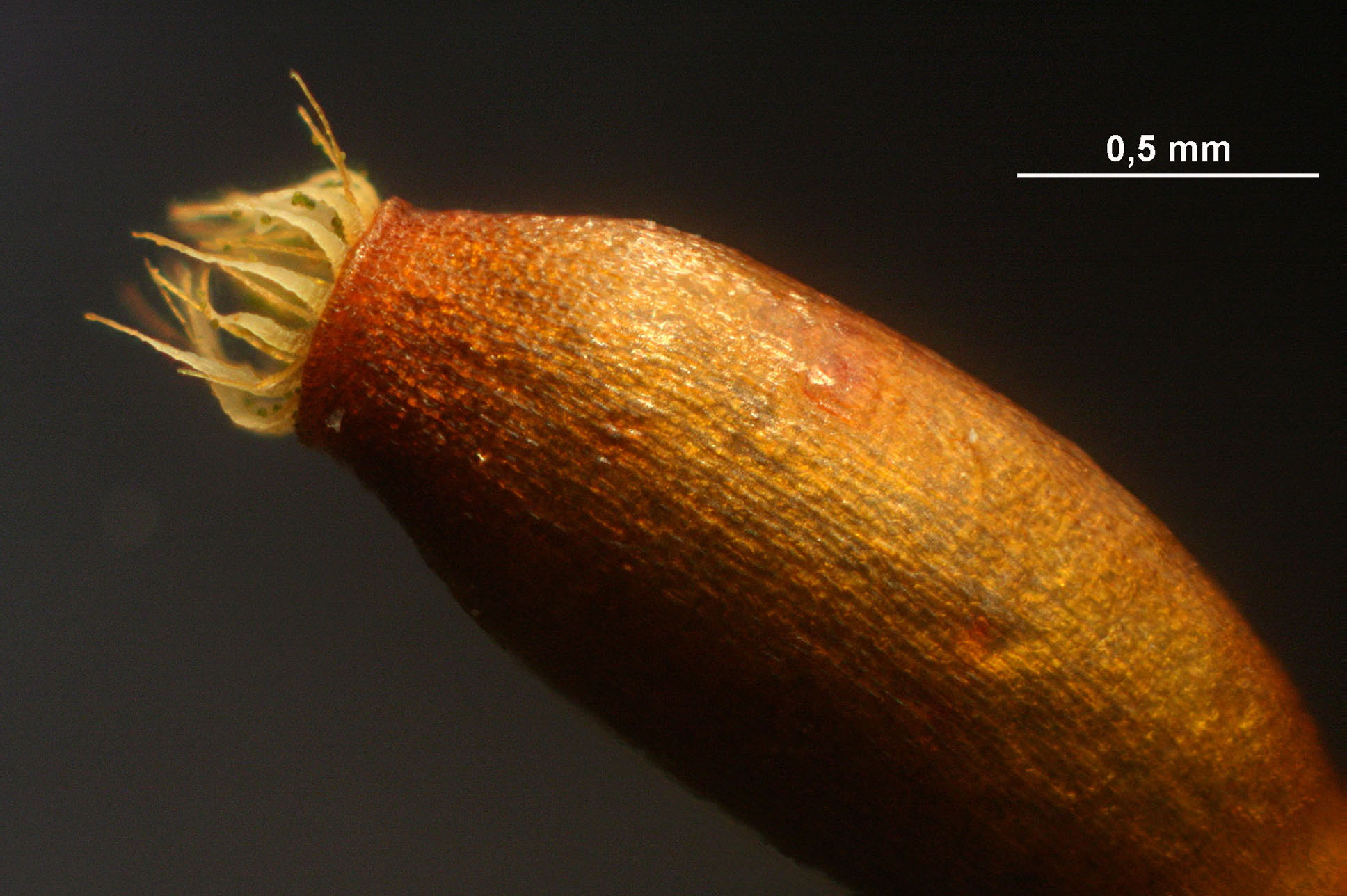
The capsule of Neckera crispa

The secondary stem and branch leaves range from erect to spreading. The leaf like structures may be secund (on one side only), ovate (oval shaped), obovate (narrower edge at the base), oblong (elongated), oblong-ligulate (long and strap-shaped), or oblong-lanceolate (long and lance shaped). They may be asymmetric or flat or strongly undulate (wavy edged). The margins are entire to serrate with recurved teeth. The apex is obtuse to acuminate and the costa (midrib) double and short, or sometimes single or absent. The basal laminal cells are linear to rectangular. The walls may or may not be pitted.

=== Sporophyte ===
The seta range from 0.1–1.2 cm (0.039–0.472 in) in length. The capsules are cylindric, oblong, or globose. The exostome teeth are lanceolate and smooth to densely papillose. They somewhat cross striate basally. The endostome basal membrane is low to high. The segments are smooth to densely papillose. The surrounding perichaetial inner leaves (modified leaves surrounding the sex organs or later the seta) are oblong, oblong-lanceolate, or ovate-subulate.

== Reproduction ==
Plants are autoicous (male and female reproductive structures on the same plant but on separate branches) or dioicous (male and female reproductive structures on separate plants). The spores are 12-39 μm in size.

== Species ==
The following species are recognised:

- Neckera abietina Hook.
- Neckera abyssinica Müll. Hal.
- Neckera aciculata (Taylor) Mitt.
- Neckera acuminata Hook.
- Neckera acutifolia Brid.
- Neckera aequalifolia Müll. Hal.
- Neckera alleghaniensis (Müll. Hal.) Mitt.
- Neckera alopecura (Brid.) Müll. Hal.
- Neckera alopecuroides Mitt.
- Neckera ambigua (Hook.) Müll. Hal.
- Neckera americana Grev.
- Neckera ampullacea Müll. Hal.
- Neckera andamana (Müll. Hal.) A. Jaeger
- Neckera andina Mitt.
- Neckera andrei Thér. & P. de la Varde
- Neckera angusta Müll. Hal.
- Neckera angustifolia Müll. Hal.
- Neckera appressa Müll. Hal.
- Neckera aptychoides Schlieph. ex Müll. Hal.
- Neckera assimilis Müll. Hal.
- Neckera attenuata (Hedw.) Myrin
- Neckera aubertii (P. Beauv.) Brid.
- Neckera aurea Schwägr.
- Neckera aurescens Hampe
- Neckera baetica J. Guerra, J. F. Jiménez & J. A. Jiménez
- Neckera balansae Müll. Hal.
- Neckera balfouriana (Grev.) Müll. Hal.
- Neckera beccariana Hampe
- Neckera bescherellei Nog.
- Neckera beyrichii Schwägr.
- Neckera bhutanensis Nog.
- Neckera biductulosa (P. Beauv.) Brid.
- Neckera blanda Harv.
- Neckera boiviniana Müll. Hal. ex Besch.
- Neckera borealis Nog.
- Neckera boryana Müll. Hal.
- Neckera brachyclada (Brid.) Müll. Hal.
- Neckera brachypus (Brid.) Müll. Hal.
- Neckera brasiliensis (Hornsch.) Müll. Hal.
- Neckera brevirostris Griff.
- Neckera brownii Dixon
- Neckera buchananii (Brid.) Müll. Hal.
- Neckera caldensis Lindb. ex Ångström
- Neckera californica Hook. & Arn.
- Neckera canariensis (Brid.) Brid.
- Neckera capillacea Griff.
- Neckera capillaris Müll. Hal.
- Neckera caudifrondea Müll. Hal.
- Neckera cephalonica Jur. & Unger
- Neckera cernua Müll. Hal.
- Neckera chilensis Schimp. ex Mont.
- Neckera chlorocaulis Müll. Hal.
- Neckera chrysoclada Müll. Hal.
- Neckera cirrifolia (Schwägr.) Müll. Hal.
- Neckera cirrosa (Hedw.) F. Weber & D. Mohr
- Neckera columnaris Schwägr.
- Neckera comes Griff.
- Neckera complanata (Hedw.) Huebener
- Neckera complicata Müll. Hal.
- Neckera compressa (Hedw.) Müll. Hal.
- Neckera coreana Cardot
- Neckera crassicaulis Müll. Hal.
- Neckera crenulata Harv.
- Neckera crinita Griff.
- Neckera crispa Hedw.
- Neckera crispatula (Hook.) Hook.
- Neckera crocea (Hampe) Müll. Hal.
- Neckera cryptotheca (Hampe) Müll. Hal.
- Neckera curvata Griff.
- Neckera curvirostris Schwägr.
- Neckera cyathipoma Müll. Hal.
- Neckera cyclophylla Müll. Hal.
- Neckera cymbifolia (Sull.) Müll. Hal.
- Neckera debilis Mitt.
- Neckera decomposita (Brid.) Müll. Hal.
- Neckera decurrens Broth.
- Neckera denigricans Enroth
- Neckera densa (Sw. ex Hedw.) Wilson
- Neckera deppei Hornsch. ex Müll. Hal.
- Neckera distans Müll. Hal.
- Neckera domingensis Spreng.
- Neckera douglasii Hook.
- Neckera drummondii (Taylor) Müll. Hal.
- Neckera duplicata (Schwägr.) A. Jaeger
- Neckera ehrenbergii Müll. Hal.
- Neckera emersa Müll. Hal. & Hampe
- Neckera enrothiana Meng-Cheng Ji
- Neckera eucarpa Schimp. ex Müll. Hal.
- Neckera exserta Hook. ex Schwägr.
- Neckera falcata Reinw. & Hornsch.
- Neckera fasciculata (Sw. ex Hedw.) Arn.
- Neckera fauriei Cardot
- Neckera filicina Hedw.
- Neckera filifera (Müll. Hal.) Müll. Hal.
- Neckera filiformis Hedw.
- Neckera flabellata (Sm.) Mitt.
- Neckera flexilis (Hedw.) Müll. Hal.
- Neckera flexiramea Cardot
- Neckera floribunda (Dozy & Molk.) Müll. Hal.
- Neckera floribundula Müll. Hal.
- Neckera formosana Nog.
- Neckera funalis (Wilson) Müll. Hal.
- Neckera fuscescens Hook.
- Neckera giulianettii Broth.
- Neckera glabella (Hedw.) F. Weber & D. Mohr
- Neckera goughiana Mitt.
- Neckera gracilenta Bosch & Sande Lac.
- Neckera gracilis (Hedw.) Müll. Hal.
- Neckera grateloupii (Mont.) Müll. Hal.
- Neckera guyanensis Mont.
- Neckera hamata Müll. Hal.
- Neckera hampeana (Müll. Hal.) Müll. Hal.
- Neckera hawaiico-pennata Müll. Hal.
- Neckera hedbergii P. de la Varde
- Neckera heterophylla Brid.
- Neckera hexasticha (Schwägr.) Müll. Hal.
- Neckera himalayana Mitt.
- Neckera hoehnelii Müll. Hal.
- Neckera hookeriana Griff.
- Neckera humboldtii (Hook.) Müll. Hal.
- Neckera humilis Mitt.
- Neckera hygrometrica (Harv. & Hook.) Müll. Hal.
- Neckera hypnoides Hedw.
- Neckera illecebrina Müll. Hal.
- Neckera imberbis (Sm.) Müll. Hal.
- Neckera imbricata (P. Beauv.) Schwägr.
- Neckera imbricatula (Müll. Hal.) Müll. Hal.
- Neckera implana Mitt.
- Neckera intermedia Brid.
- Neckera inundata Broth.
- Neckera jamesii (Schimp.) Kindb.
- Neckera julacea Hook. ex Schwägr.
- Neckera jurassica J.J. Amann ex Limpr.
- Neckera kamakurana S. Okamura
- Neckera konoi Broth.
- Neckera korthalsiana Dozy & Molk.
- Neckera laeta Griff.
- Neckera laevidens Broth. ex Wu, Peng-Cheng & Y. Jia
- Neckera laevigata Hook. f. & Wilson
- Neckera lagura (Hook.) Müll. Hal.
- Neckera laxa (Wilson) Müll. Hal.
- Neckera leichhardtii Hampe & Müll. Hal.
- Neckera lentula (Wilson) Broth.
- Neckera leptodontea Müll. Hal.
- Neckera leucocolea Mitt.
- Neckera leuconeura Müll. Hal.
- Neckera lineolata (Duby) Müll. Hal.
- Neckera lingulata Mitt.
- Neckera livens (Schwägr.) Müll. Hal.
- Neckera longifolia Müll. Hal.
- Neckera longisetacea Müll. Hal.
- Neckera lurida Griff.
- Neckera lusitanica (Schimp.) Kindb.
- Neckera macounii (Müll. Hal. & Kindb.) Kindb.
- Neckera macrocarpa Brid.
- Neckera macropoda Hedw.
- Neckera madagascariensis (Brid.) Müll. Hal.
- Neckera madecassa Besch.
- Neckera marginata (Paris) Broth.
- Neckera menziesii Drumm.
- Neckera moenkemeyeri Müll. Hal.
- Neckera mollis (Hedw.) Müll. Hal.
- Neckera montagneana Müll. Hal.
- Neckera mucronata Bosch & Sande Lac.
- Neckera nakazimae (Iisiba) Nog.
- Neckera nano-disticha Geh.
- Neckera neckeroides (Broth.) Enroth & B.C. Tan
- Neckera nelloi Broth. ex Tongiorgi
- Neckera neomexicana (Cardot) Grout
- Neckera nigricans (Hook.) Nees
- Neckera nitidula (Mitt.) Broth.
- Neckera noguchiana Meng-Cheng Ji & Enroth
- Neckera obtusifolia Taylor
- Neckera ohioensis (Sull.) Müll. Hal.
- Neckera orthocarpa (Brid.) Müll. Hal.
- Neckera pachycarpa Schimp. ex Besch.
- Neckera pachygaster Müll. Hal.
- Neckera pallescens Müll. Hal.
- Neckera pallida (Hook.) Müll. Hal.
- Neckera parishiana Mitt.
- Neckera penduliramea Müll. Hal.
- Neckera pennata Hedw.
- Neckera perpinnata Cardot & Thér.
- Neckera perpusilla (De Not.) Müll. Hal.
- Neckera perrottetii (Mont.) Müll. Hal.
- Neckera philippeana Schimp.
- Neckera philippinensis (Broth.) Paris
- Neckera phleoides (Desv. ex Brid.) Müll. Hal.
- Neckera phyllogonioides Sull.
- Neckera pilifera (Sw.) Spruce
- Neckera platyantha (Müll. Hal.) Paris
- Neckera plicata (Brid.) Schwägr.
- Neckera plumosa Reinw. & Hornsch.
- Neckera plumula (Nees) Müll. Hal.
- Neckera pluvinii (Brid.) Steud.
- Neckera pohlii (Schwägr.) Müll. Hal.
- Neckera polyclada Müll. Hal.
- Neckera polytrichoides (Hedw.) F. Weber & D. Mohr
- Neckera praelonga Lorentz
- Neckera procumbens Müll. Hal.
- Neckera producta (Hornsch.) Müll. Hal.
- Neckera pseudocrispa Rehmann ex Müll. Hal.
- Neckera pseudopennata (Warnst.) Schlieph. ex Zmuda
- Neckera puiggarii Geh. & Hampe
- Neckera pulchella Griff.
- Neckera pulvinata (Wahlenb.) Müll. Hal.
- Neckera pumila Hedw.
- Neckera pusilla Mitt.
- Neckera rectifolia Mitt.
- Neckera regnelliana Müll. Hal.
- Neckera reinwardtii (Nees) Müll. Hal.
- Neckera remota Bruch & Schimp. ex Müll. Hal.
- Neckera repens (Brid.) Schwägr.
- Neckera retrorsa (Mitt.) Müll. Hal.
- Neckera rigidula Wilson ex Mitt.
- Neckera rostrata Griff.
- Neckera rotundata Broth.
- Neckera sanctae-catharinae Müll. Hal.
- Neckera scabridens Müll. Hal.
- Neckera scabriseta Schwägr.
- Neckera schnyderi Müll. Hal.
- Neckera sciuroides (Hedw.) Müll. Hal.
- Neckera secunda (Hook.) Müll. Hal.
- Neckera seductrix Hedw.
- Neckera semicrispa Cardot & P. de la Varde
- Neckera semitorta Müll. Hal.
- Neckera semperiana Hampe
- Neckera serrulata (P. Beauv.) Brid.
- Neckera serrulatifolia Enroth & M. C. Ji
- Neckera setosa (Hedw.) Hook.
- Neckera setschwanica Broth.
- Neckera shanwanica P.C. Wu & Y.H. Feng
- Neckera sieboldii (Dozy & Molk.) Müll. Hal.
- Neckera smithii (Hedw.) Müll. Hal.
- Neckera spathulaefolia (Müll. Hal.) Mitt.
- Neckera spathulata (Dixon) Dixon
- Neckera speciosa (Nog.) Nog.
- Neckera sphaerocarpa Hook.
- Neckera splachnoides Sm.
- Neckera spruceana Mitt.
- Neckera spurio-truncata Müll. Hal. ex Dusén
- Neckera squarrosa Hook. ex Harv.
- Neckera squarrulosa (Mont.) Müll. Hal.
- Neckera striata (Schwägr.) Schwägr.
- Neckera submacrocarpa Dixon
- Neckera subserrata Hook. ex Harv.
- Neckera subulata (P. Beauv.) Müll. Hal.
- Neckera subuliformis Reinw. & Hornsch.
- Neckera sulcata (Hook.) Müll. Hal.
- Neckera sullivantii Müll. Hal.
- Neckera sundaensis Müll. Hal.
- Neckera targioniana Mitt.
- Neckera tenella Schwägr.
- Neckera tenera Hornsch.
- Neckera tenuis Hook.
- Neckera ternstroemiae (Brid.) Müll. Hal.
- Neckera tetragona (Sw. ex Hedw.) Müll. Hal.
- Neckera tomentosa (Hook.) Müll. Hal.
- Neckera trichoclada (Taylor) Müll. Hal.
- Neckera trichomanoides (Hedw.) Hartm.
- Neckera trichophora (Mont.) Müll. Hal.
- Neckera trichophylla (Sw. ex Hedw.) Sw.
- Neckera truncata Müll. Hal.
- Neckera undulatifolia (Tixier) Enroth
- Neckera urceolata (Schwägr.) Müll. Hal.
- Neckera urnigera Müll. Hal.
- Neckera uroclada Mitt.
- Neckera urvilleana Müll. Hal.
- Neckera vaginans Welw. & Duby
- Neckera valentiniana Besch.
- Neckera versicolor Müll. Hal.
- Neckera villae-ricae Besch.
- Neckera viridula Mitt.
- Neckera wallichii (Brid.) Cardot ex Müll. Hal.
- Neckera webbiana (Mont.) Düll
- Neckera welwitschii Duby
- Neckera wercklei Broth. & Thér.
- Neckera xizangensis Enroth & M. C. Ji
- Neckera yezoana Besch.
- Neckera yunnanensis Enroth
