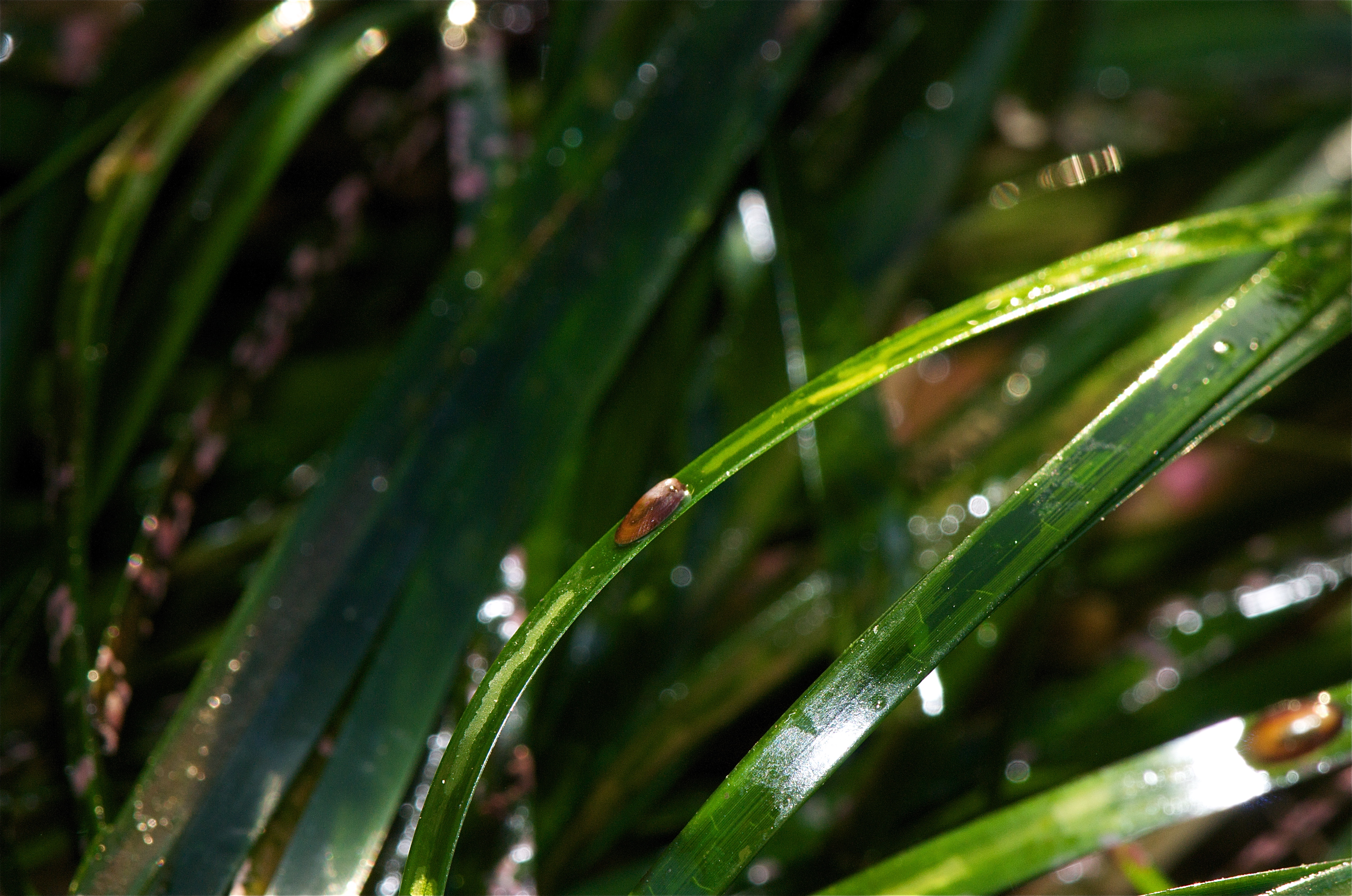
- Close-up photo of a leaf blade of a Phyllospadix species (surfgrass) with a marine snail on the leaves.

Scientific classification
- Kingdom: Plantae
- Clade: Tracheophytes
- Clade: Angiosperms
- Clade: Monocots
- Order: Alismatales
- Family: Zosteraceae
- Genus: Phyllospadix; Hooker (1840)

= Phyllospadix =

Surfgrass

Genus of aquatic plants

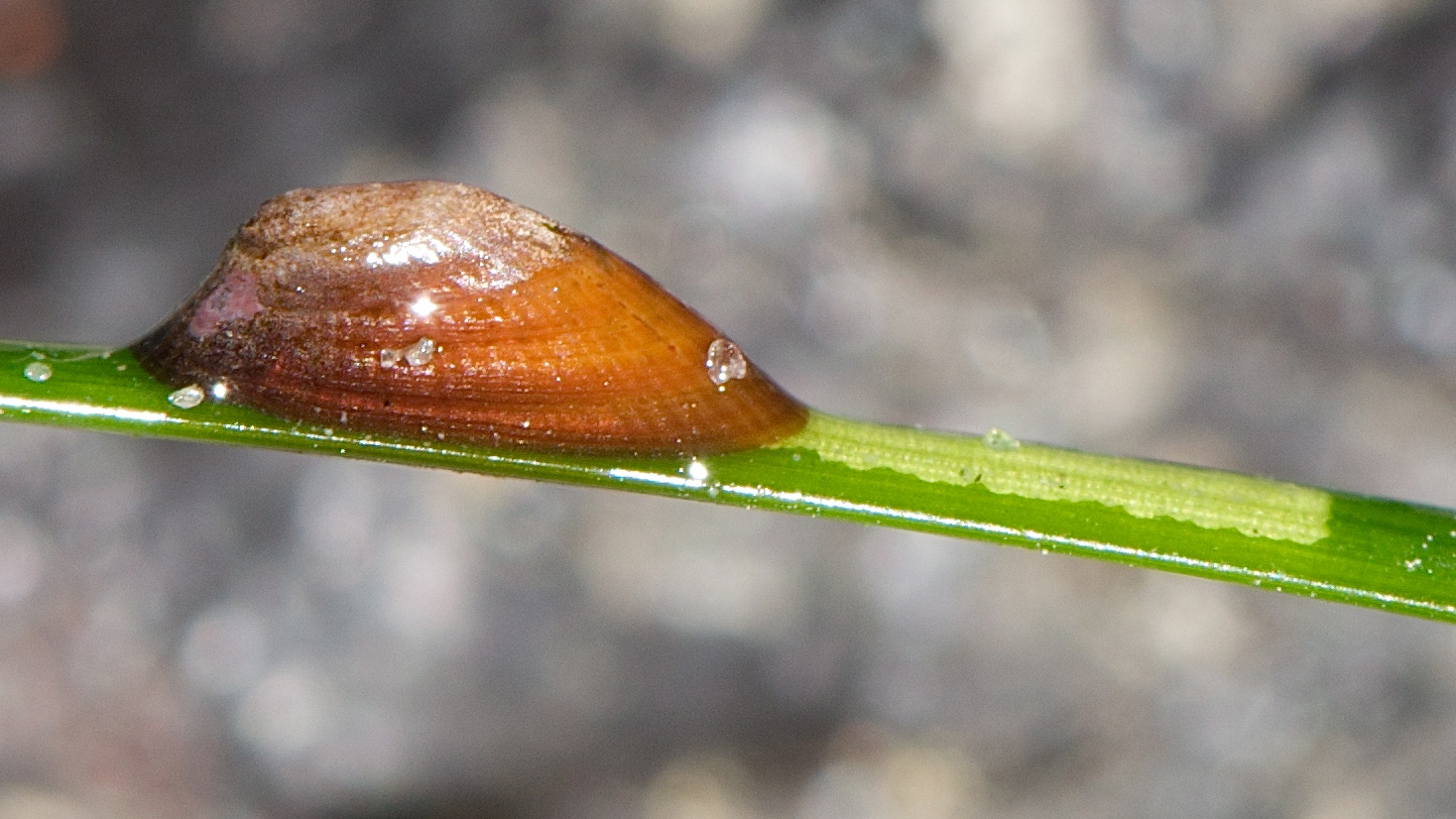
Phyllospadix is a food source for many animals including this Tectura palacea.

Phyllospadix, commonly known as surfgrass, is a genus of seagrass, a flowering plant in the family Zosteraceae, described as a genus in 1840. Phyllospadix grows in marine waters along the coasts of the temperate North Pacific.

It is one of the seagrass genera that can perform completely submerged pollination.

== Species ==
Accepted species

- Phyllospadix iwatensis – China, Korea, Japan, Russian Far East
- Phyllospadix japonicus – China, Korea, Japan
- Phyllospadix juzepczukii – Russian Far East
- Phyllospadix scouleri (type species) – Alaska to Baja California
- Phyllospadix serrulatus – Alaska, British Columbia, Washington
- Phyllospadix torreyi – British Columbia to northwestern Mexico
