= Thamnobryum alopecurum =

Scientific classification
- Kingdom: Plantae
- Division: Bryophyta
- Class: Bryopsida
- Subclass: Bryidae
- Order: Hypnales
- Family: Neckeraceae
- Genus: Thamnobryum
- Species: T. alopecurum

Binomial name
- Thamnobryum alopecurum (Hedw.) Nieuwl. ex Gangulee

Synonyms
- List: Hypnum alopecurum Hedw.; Isothecium alopecurum (Hedw.) Spruce; Thamnium alopecurum (Hedw.) Schimp.; Thamnium alopecurum subsp. mediterraneum Bott.\; Thamnium mediterraneum (Bott.) G. Roth

Species of moss

Thamnobryum alopecurum is a species of moss belonging to the family Neckeraceae.
