= Phyllospadix serrulatus =

Toothed surfgrass

Conservation status
- Least Concern (IUCN 3.1)

Scientific classification
- Kingdom: Plantae
- Clade: Tracheophytes
- Clade: Angiosperms
- Clade: Monocots
- Order: Alismatales
- Family: Zosteraceae
- Genus: Phyllospadix
- Species: P. serrulatus

Binomial name
- Phyllospadix serrulatus Rupr. ex Asch.

Species of aquatic plant

Phyllospadix serrulatus is a species of aquatic plant in the Zosteraceae family. It is referred to by the common name toothed surfgrass, and is found along the shorelines of British Columbia and southern Alaska. It is also found in Oregon. It grows in salt marshes in the intertidal zone.

Phyllospadix serrulatus is a grass-like herb with leaves up to 60 cm (24 in) long, with teeth along the margins toward the tip.
