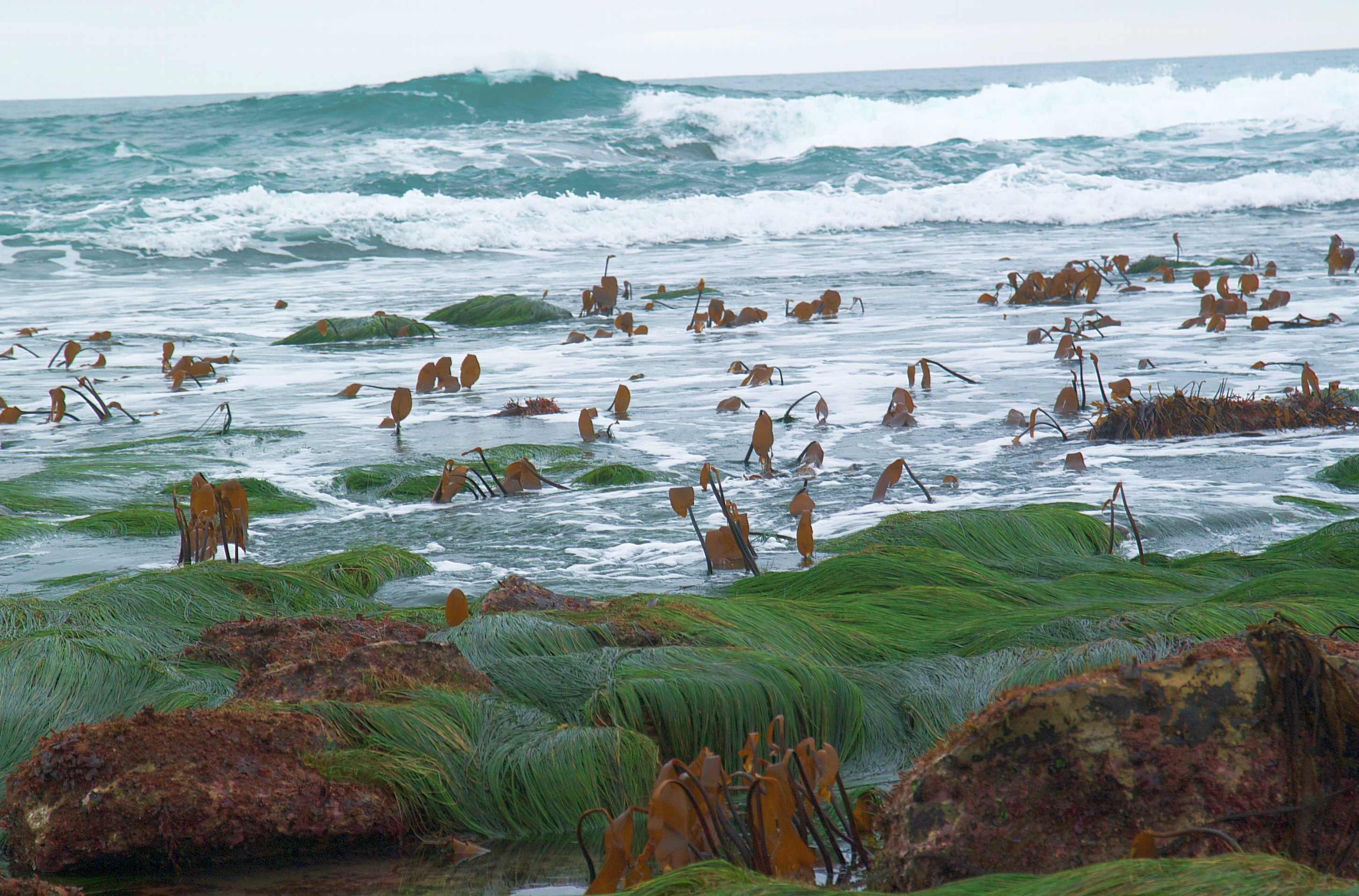
- Surf grass exposed at low tide, with Laminaria setchllii kelp, Montana de Oro State Park

Scientific classification
- Kingdom: Plantae
- Clade: Tracheophytes
- Clade: Angiosperms
- Clade: Monocots
- Order: Alismatales
- Family: Zosteraceae
- Genus: Phyllospadix
- Species: P. scouleri

Binomial name
- Phyllospadix scouleri Hook, 1838

= Phyllospadix scouleri =

Species of aquatic plant

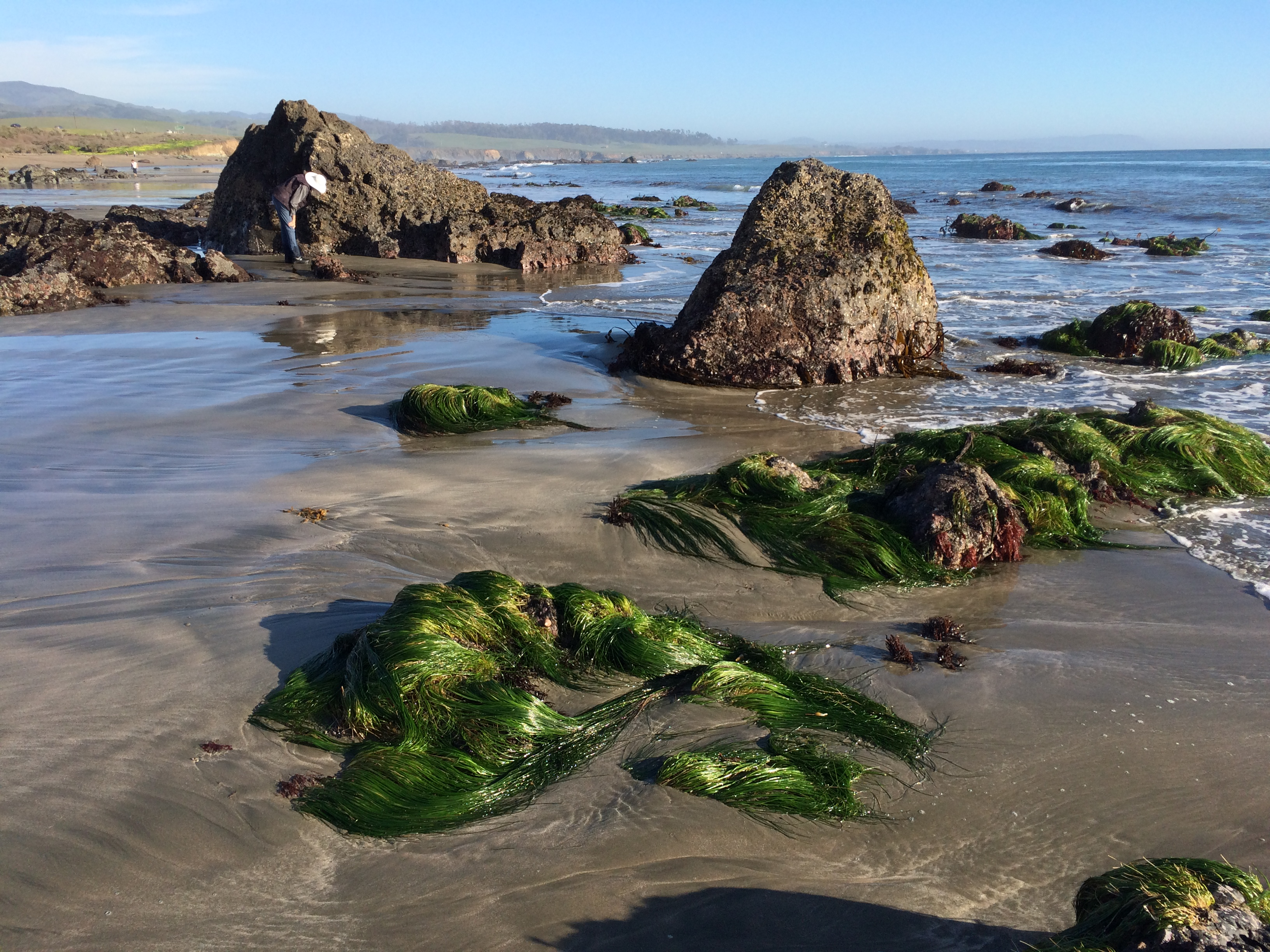
Surfgrass at Hearst Beach, San Simeon, California

Phyllospadix scouleri, or Scouler's surfgrass, is a flowering marine plant in the family Zosteraceae. It is native to the coastline of western North America from the Alaskan panhandle to Baja California.

This slender, vivid green plant has long, flat blades. It grows in large clumps or beds exposed during low tide and submerged at high tide. It is found attached to rocks in the middle to low intertidal zones.

== Biology ==
Male and female flowers are born on different plants and there are many more female plants than males. The flowers are in spikes at the base of the leaves and do not have petals. The pollen is spread by water movement which can occur underwater, but most pollination takes place on the surface of the sea at very low tides. Seedlings cannot establish themselves directly on rocks or colonise bare areas. Instead they germinate among algae, such as red coralline algae, attaching themselves by means of small barbs and intertwining their roots among the algae as they grow. They also send out rhizomes which can colonise new areas. When established, the surf grass may dominate the habitat. A biodiverse invertebrate community lives in surf grass beds and includes snails, limpets and crustaceans, and algae may grow on the stems and leaves.

== Uses ==
Sea grass was used by Native American tribes along the Southern California Coast to make cordage and other woven objects, including specimens from San Miguel Island dated between about 10,000 and 8,600 years ago (see Connolly, Erlandson, and Norris 1992).

== Habitat ==
It is endemic to Baja California. It lives in rocky areas with turbulent tides.
