= Phyllospadix torreyi =

Torrey's surfgrass

Scientific classification
- Kingdom: Plantae
- Clade: Tracheophytes
- Clade: Angiosperms
- Clade: Monocots
- Order: Alismatales
- Family: Zosteraceae
- Genus: Phyllospadix
- Species: P. torreyi

Binomial name
- Phyllospadix torreyi S.Wats.

Species of aquatic plant

Phyllospadix torreyi, Torrey's surfgrass, is a plant species found along the Pacific Coasts of British Columbia, Washington, Oregon, California and Baja California (including Guadalupe Island). It grows in salt marshes in the intertidal zones.

Phyllospadix torreyi is a grass-like plant with toothless leaves up to 60 cm long.

Phyllospadix torreyi is the obligate host to the epiphytes, Melobesia mediocris and Smithora naiadum.
