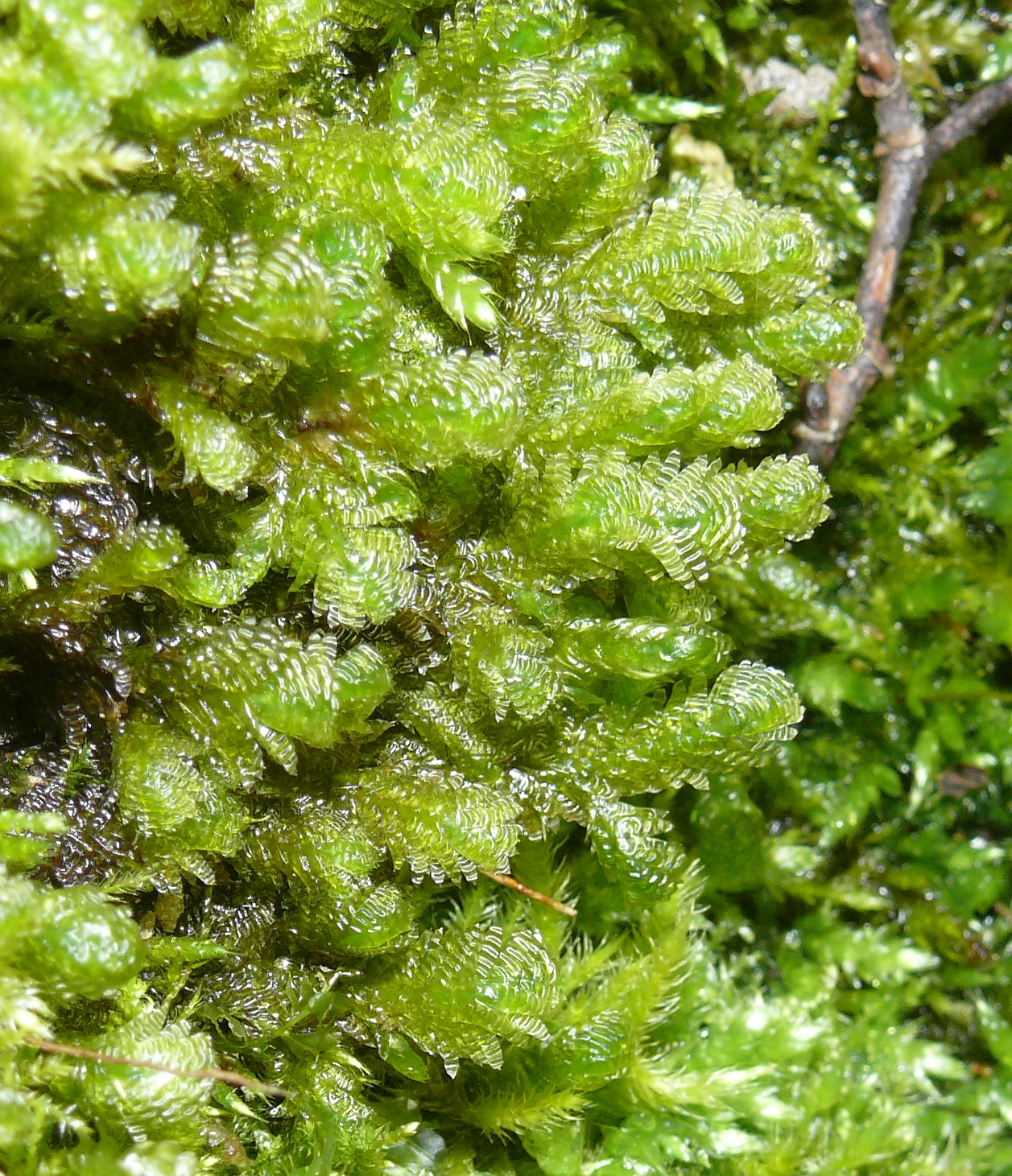

Scientific classification
- Kingdom: Plantae
- Division: Bryophyta
- Class: Bryopsida
- Subclass: Bryidae
- Order: Hypnales
- Family: Neckeraceae
- Genus: Exsertotheca
- Species: E. crispa

Binomial name
- Exsertotheca crispa (Hedw.) S.Olsson, Enroth & D.Quandt

Synonyms
- Neckera crispa Hedw.

= Exsertotheca crispa =

Species of moss

Exsertotheca crispa, crisped neckera, is a species of moss belonging to the family Neckeraceae.

It is native to Europe and China. In Iceland, it is found at only two locations, growing on palagonite cliffs, and has the conservation status of a vulnerable species (VU).
