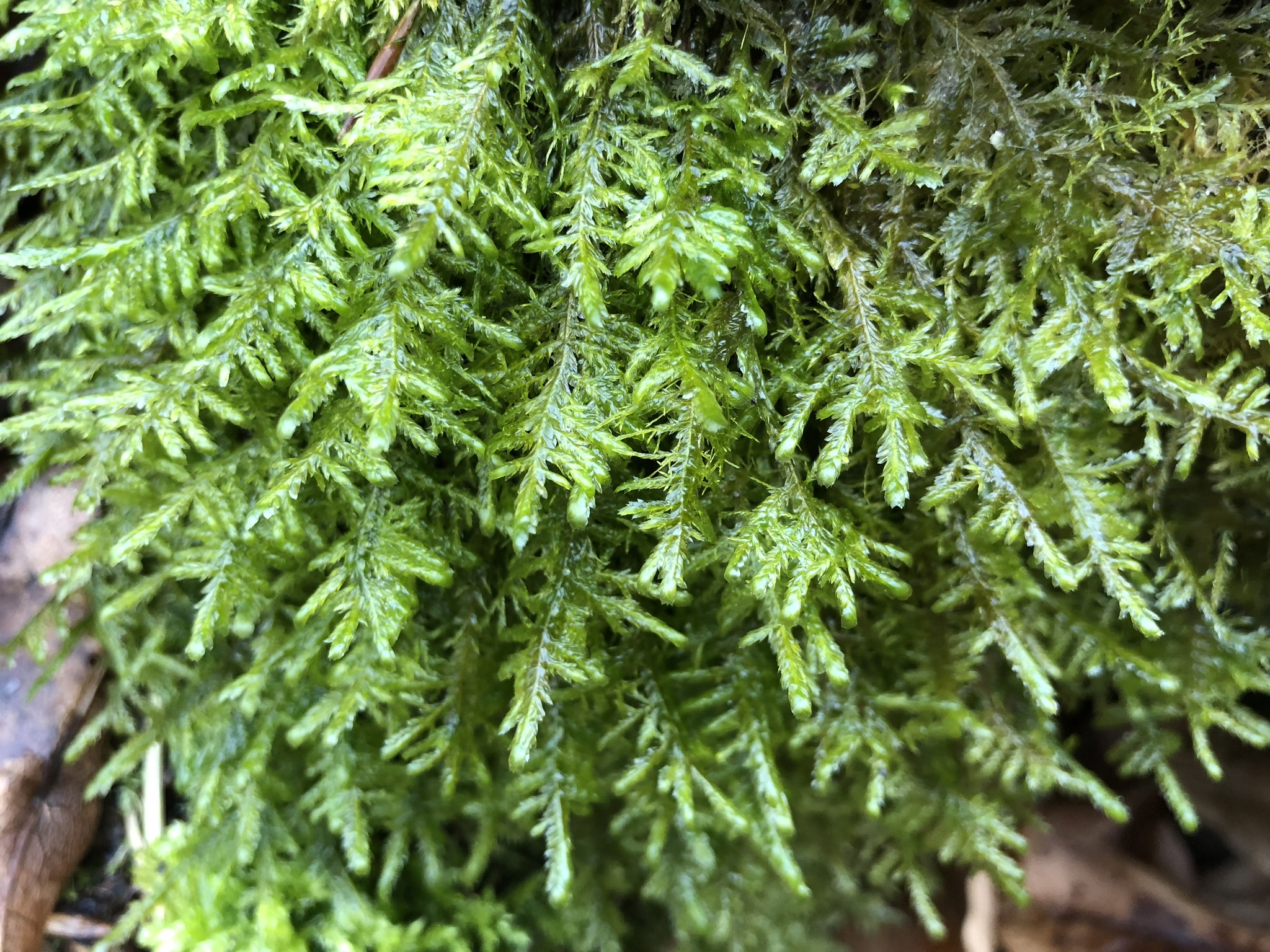

Scientific classification
- Kingdom: Plantae
- Division: Bryophyta
- Class: Bryopsida
- Subclass: Bryidae
- Order: Hypnales
- Family: Neckeraceae
- Genus: Alleniella
- Species: A. complanata

Binomial name
- Alleniella complanata (Hedw.) S.Olsson, Enroth & D.Quandt

Synonyms
- Hypnum complanatum (Hedw.) With.; Leskea complanata Hedw.; Neckera complanata (Hedw.) Huebener

= Alleniella complanata =

Species of moss

Alleniella complanata, the flat Neckera, is a species of moss belonging to the family Neckeraceae. This species of moss was found in the colon of the Tyrolean Iceman.
