= List of Canadian plants by family =

This is the list of the plants in Canada, ordered by family. This list does not include introduced species, which form a separate list.

- List of Canadian Heritage Wheat Varieties
- List of Canadian plants by genus
- List of the plants of Canada
- List of the ferns and allies of Canada
- List of the conifers of Canada
- List of the bryophytes of Canada
- List of wildflowers of the Canadian Rocky Mountains
