= Neomacounia =

Conservation status
- Extinct (ca. 1864) (IUCN 2.3)

Scientific classification
- Kingdom: Plantae
- Division: Bryophyta
- Class: Bryopsida
- Subclass: Bryidae
- Order: Hypnales
- Family: Neckeraceae
- Genus: Neomacounia; Ireland, 1974
- Species: †N. nitida

Binomial name
- †Neomacounia nitida Lindb. Ireland

Synonyms
- Forsstroemia nitida Lindb.

Extinct genus of mosses

Neomacounia nitida, or Macoun's shining moss, is an extinct moss that was found only in a small area of Ontario, and the sole species in the genus Neomacounia.

== Biology ==
Macoun's shining moss was a large bryophyte with long greenish-brown tufts. The tufts were shiny and up to 6 cm long. The moss was hermaphroditic and capable of fertilizing itself.

The plant was an epiphyte. It lived near the base of tree trunks of various species of elm and cedar that grew in swampy areas. The only known location where this species occurred was in three locales near Belleville, Ontario.

=== Taxonomy ===
The species was originally described as Forsstroemia nitida. In 1974, it was reclassified in the monotypic genus Neomacounia. Not all bryologists accept that it is in a monotypic genus, or that it should be placed in the family Neckeraceae. Most recent publications accept the current classification of Macoun's shining moss. The common name honours John Macoun (1831–1920), who was an Irish-born Canadian naturalist.

=== Extinction ===
The area where the samples were found was clear-cut for economic purposes between 1864 and 1892, implying that the species became extinct due to habitat loss during that time. Searches and surveys looking for the species were conducted in 1972 and 2001. They failed to find any evidence for the species' continued existence.

This species is the only known endemic Canadian plant to become extinct since the 16th century.

== Specimens ==
All known samples of N. nitida were from three collections taken between 1862 and 1864. At least two of the collections were made by John Macoun. As Macoun had mislabelled other samples before, some doubt exists about from where they were taken.
