= List of the conifers of Canada =

This is a listing of the conifers of Canada, and includes the cypresses, junipers, firs, pines, spruces, larches, hemlocks and yews.

Legend
Secure	Apparently secure	Vulnerable	Imperiled	Critically imperiled	Not assessed	Historical	Extirpated	Introduced

EX - Exotic (introduced)

== Cupressaceae (cypresses) ==
Species name	Range in Canada										Global rank	Notes
Species name	YK	NT			NU			LB	CA		Global rank	Notes
Species name	BC	AB	SK	MB	ON	QC	NB	PE	NS	NF	Global rank	Notes
Callitropsis nootkatensis Nootka cypress	YK	NT			NU			LB	CA		Secure
Callitropsis nootkatensis Nootka cypress	BC	AB	SK	MB	ON	QC	NB	PE	NS	NF	Secure
Juniperus communis Common juniper	YK	NT			NU			LB	CA		Secure
Juniperus communis Common juniper	BC	AB	SK	MB	ON	QC	NB	PE	NS	NF	Secure
Juniperus horizontalis Creeping juniper	YK	NT			NU			LB	CA		Secure
Juniperus horizontalis Creeping juniper	BC	AB	SK	MB	ON	QC	NB	PE	NS	NF	Secure
Juniperus scopulorum Rocky Mountain juniper	YK	NT			NU			LB	CA		Secure
Juniperus scopulorum Rocky Mountain juniper	BC	AB	SK	MB	ON	QC	NB	PE	NS	NF	Secure
Juniperus virginiana Eastern red-cedar	YK	NT			NU			LB	CA		Secure
Juniperus virginiana Eastern red-cedar	BC	AB	SK	MB	ON	QC	NB	PE	NS	NF	Secure
Thuja occidentalis Northern white cedar	YK	NT			NU			LB	CA		Secure
Thuja occidentalis Northern white cedar	BC	AB	SK	MB	ON	QC	NB	PE	NS	NF	Secure
Thuja plicata Western red cedar	YK	NT			NU			LB	CA		Secure
Thuja plicata Western red cedar	BC	AB	SK	MB	ON	QC	NB	PE	NS	NF	Secure

== Pinaceae (pines) ==
Species name	Range in Canada										Global rank	Notes
Species name	YK	NT			NU			LB	CA		Global rank	Notes
Species name	BC	AB	SK	MB	ON	QC	NB	PE	NS	NF	Global rank	Notes
Abies amabilis Pacific silver fir	YK	NT			NU			LB	CA		Secure
Abies amabilis Pacific silver fir	BC	AB	SK	MB	ON	QC	NB	PE	NS	NF	Secure
Abies balsamea Balsam fir	YK	NT			NU			LB	CA		Secure
Abies balsamea Balsam fir	BC	AB	SK	MB	ON	QC	NB	PE	NS	NF	Secure
Abies grandis Grand fir	YK	NT			NU			LB	CA		Secure
Abies grandis Grand fir	BC	AB	SK	MB	ON	QC	NB	PE	NS	NF	Secure
Abies lasiocarpa Subalpine fir	YK	NT			NU			LB	CA		Secure
Abies lasiocarpa Subalpine fir	BC	AB	SK	MB	ON	QC	NB	PE	NS	NF	Secure
Larix decidua European larch	YK	NT			NU			LB	CA		Secure	EX (Europe)
Larix decidua European larch	BC	AB	SK	MB	ON	QC	NB	PE	NS	NF	Secure	EX (Europe)
Larix kaempferi Japanese larch	YK	NT			NU			LB	CA		Secure	EX (Japan)
Larix kaempferi Japanese larch	BC	AB	SK	MB	ON	QC	NB	PE	NS	NF	Secure	EX (Japan)
Larix laricina Tamarack	YK	NT			NU			LB	CA		Secure
Larix laricina Tamarack	BC	AB	SK	MB	ON	QC	NB	PE	NS	NF	Secure
Larix lyallii Subalpine larch	YK	NT			NU			LB	CA		Secure
Larix lyallii Subalpine larch	BC	AB	SK	MB	ON	QC	NB	PE	NS	NF	Secure
Larix occidentalis Western larch	YK	NT			NU			LB	CA		Secure
Larix occidentalis Western larch	BC	AB	SK	MB	ON	QC	NB	PE	NS	NF	Secure
Picea abies Norway spruce	YK	NT			NU			LB	CA		Secure	EX (N Europe)
Picea abies Norway spruce	BC	AB	SK	MB	ON	QC	NB	PE	NS	NF	Secure	EX (N Europe)
Picea engelmannii Engelmann's spruce	YK	NT			NU			LB	CA		Secure
Picea engelmannii Engelmann's spruce	BC	AB	SK	MB	ON	QC	NB	PE	NS	NF	Secure
Picea glauca White spruce	YK	NT			NU			LB	CA		Secure
Picea glauca White spruce	BC	AB	SK	MB	ON	QC	NB	PE	NS	NF	Secure
Picea mariana Black spruce	YK	NT			NU			LB	CA		Secure
Picea mariana Black spruce	BC	AB	SK	MB	ON	QC	NB	PE	NS	NF	Secure
Picea pungens Blue spruce	YK	NT			NU			LB	CA		Secure	EX (W United States)
Picea pungens Blue spruce	BC	AB	SK	MB	ON	QC	NB	PE	NS	NF	Secure	EX (W United States)
Picea rubens Red spruce	YK	NT			NU			LB	CA		Secure
Picea rubens Red spruce	BC	AB	SK	MB	ON	QC	NB	PE	NS	NF	Secure
Picea sitchensis Sitka spruce	YK	NT			NU			LB	CA		Secure
Picea sitchensis Sitka spruce	BC	AB	SK	MB	ON	QC	NB	PE	NS	NF	Secure
Pinus albicaulis Whitebark pine	YK	NT			NU			LB	CA		Vulnerable
Pinus albicaulis Whitebark pine	BC	AB	SK	MB	ON	QC	NB	PE	NS	NF	Vulnerable
Pinus banksiana Jack pine	YK	NT			NU			LB	CA		Secure	Introduced to NL
Pinus banksiana Jack pine	BC	AB	SK	MB	ON	QC	NB	PE	NS	NF	Secure	Introduced to NL
Pinus contorta Lodgepole pine	YK	NT			NU			LB	CA		Secure
Pinus contorta Lodgepole pine	BC	AB	SK	MB	ON	QC	NB	PE	NS	NF	Secure
Pinus flexilis Limber pine	YK	NT			NU			LB	CA		Secure
Pinus flexilis Limber pine	BC	AB	SK	MB	ON	QC	NB	PE	NS	NF	Secure
Pinus monticola Western white pine	YK	NT			NU			LB	CA		Secure
Pinus monticola Western white pine	BC	AB	SK	MB	ON	QC	NB	PE	NS	NF	Secure
Pinus mugo Mugo pine	YK	NT			NU			LB	CA		Secure	EX (Europe)
Pinus mugo Mugo pine	BC	AB	SK	MB	ON	QC	NB	PE	NS	NF	Secure	EX (Europe)
Pinus nigra Black pine	YK	NT			NU			LB	CA		Secure	EX (S Europe)
Pinus nigra Black pine	BC	AB	SK	MB	ON	QC	NB	PE	NS	NF	Secure	EX (S Europe)
Pinus ponderosa Ponderosa pine	YK	NT			NU			LB	CA		Secure	Introduced to AB
Pinus ponderosa Ponderosa pine	BC	AB	SK	MB	ON	QC	NB	PE	NS	NF	Secure	Introduced to AB
Pinus resinosa Red pine	YK	NT			NU			LB	CA		Secure
Pinus resinosa Red pine	BC	AB	SK	MB	ON	QC	NB	PE	NS	NF	Secure
Pinus rigida Pitch pine	YK	NT			NU			LB	CA		Secure	Introduced to NS
Pinus rigida Pitch pine	BC	AB	SK	MB	ON	QC	NB	PE	NS	NF	Secure	Introduced to NS
Pinus strobus Eastern white pine	YK	NT			NU			LB	CA		Secure
Pinus strobus Eastern white pine	BC	AB	SK	MB	ON	QC	NB	PE	NS	NF	Secure
Pinus sylvestris Scots pine	YK	NT			NU			LB	CA		Secure	EX (Europe). Invasive in NS
Pinus sylvestris Scots pine	BC	AB	SK	MB	ON	QC	NB	PE	NS	NF	Secure	EX (Europe). Invasive in NS
Pinus virginiana Virginia pine	YK	NT			NU			LB	CA		Secure	EX (E United States)
Pinus virginiana Virginia pine	BC	AB	SK	MB	ON	QC	NB	PE	NS	NF	Secure	EX (E United States)
Pseudotsuga menziesii Douglas-fir	YK	NT			NU			LB	CA		Secure
Pseudotsuga menziesii Douglas-fir	BC	AB	SK	MB	ON	QC	NB	PE	NS	NF	Secure
Tsuga canadensis Eastern hemlock	YK	NT			NU			LB	CA		Secure
Tsuga canadensis Eastern hemlock	BC	AB	SK	MB	ON	QC	NB	PE	NS	NF	Secure
Tsuga heterophylla Western hemlock	YK	NT			NU			LB	CA		Secure
Tsuga heterophylla Western hemlock	BC	AB	SK	MB	ON	QC	NB	PE	NS	NF	Secure
Tsuga mertensiana Mountain hemlock	YK	NT			NU			LB	CA		Secure
Tsuga mertensiana Mountain hemlock	BC	AB	SK	MB	ON	QC	NB	PE	NS	NF	Secure

== Taxaceae (yews) ==
Species name	Range in Canada										Global rank	Notes
Species name	YK	NT			NU			LB	CA		Global rank	Notes
Species name	BC	AB	SK	MB	ON	QC	NB	PE	NS	NF	Global rank	Notes
Taxus baccata English yew	YK	NT			NU			LB	CA		Secure	Exotic (Eurasia)
Taxus baccata English yew	BC	AB	SK	MB	ON	QC	NB	PE	NS	NF	Secure	Exotic (Eurasia)
Taxus brevifolia Pacific yew	YK	NT			NU			LB	CA		Secure
Taxus brevifolia Pacific yew	BC	AB	SK	MB	ON	QC	NB	PE	NS	NF	Secure
Taxus canadensis Canada yew	YK	NT			NU			LB	CA		Secure
Taxus canadensis Canada yew	BC	AB	SK	MB	ON	QC	NB	PE	NS	NF	Secure
