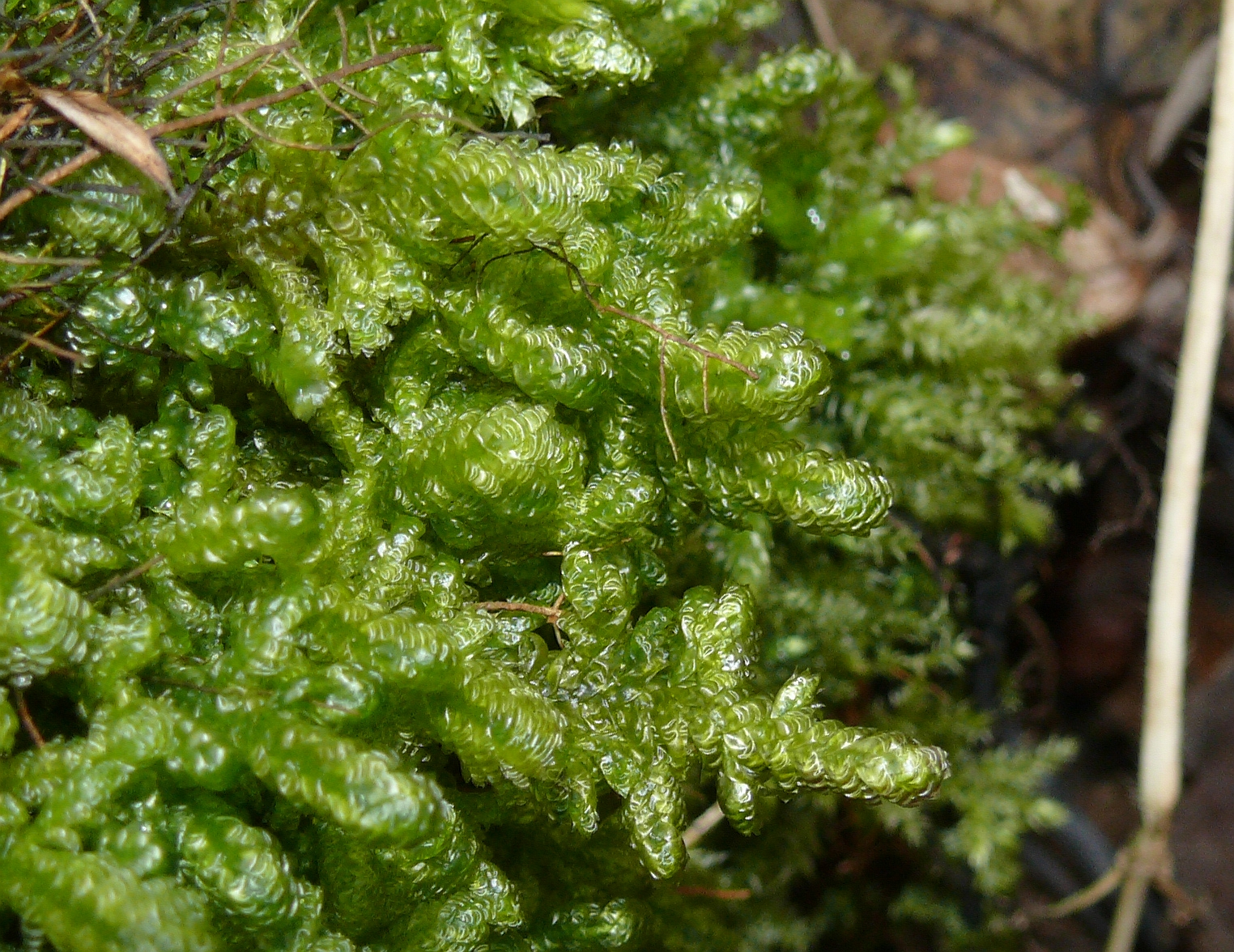
- Neckera crispa

Scientific classification
- Kingdom: Plantae
- Division: Bryophyta
- Class: Bryopsida
- Subclass: Bryidae
- Order: Hypnales
- Family: Neckeraceae; Schimp.

Genera
- See Classification

Synonyms
- Thamniaceae

= Neckeraceae =

Family of mosses

Neckeraceae is a moss family in the order Hypnales. There are about 200 species native to temperate and tropical regions. Most grow on rocks, or other plants.

== Description ==
Members of the family are usually large and glossy plants with creeping stolons that bear small leaves and tufts of rhizoids. Stems are generally frondose, but may rarely be dendroid. Leaf cell shape is almost always smooth, short, and firm-walled. Marginal cells are typically quadrate to short-rectangular in few to several rows. The sporophyte features are variable between genera.

Species are epiphytic, epilithic, or aquatic.

== Classification ==
The Neckeraceae were originally placed within the Leucodontales. However, they are now included in the Hypnales. As of 2024, the following genera are recognised in the family Neckeraceae:

- Alleniella S. Olsson, Enroth & D. Quandt
- Austrothamnium Enroth
- Baldwiniella Broth. ex M. Fleisch.
- Bryobuckia Enroth
- Caduciella Enroth
- Chileobryon Enroth
- Circulifolium S. Olsson, Enroth & D. Quandt
- Cryptoleptodon Renauld & Cardot
- Curvicladium Enroth
- Dannorrisia Enroth
- Echinodiopsis S. Olsson, Enroth & D. Quandt
- Enrothia Ignatov & Fedosov
- Exsertotheca S. Olsson, Enroth & D. Quandt
- Forsstroemia Lindb.
- Handeliobryum Broth.
- Himantocladium (Mitt.) M. Fleisch.
- Homalia Brid.
- Homaliodendron M. Fleisch.
- Hydrocryphaea Dixon
- Indoneckera Enroth
- Isodrepanium (Mitt.) E. Britton
- Kanagambigai D. Subram.
- Leptodon D. Mohr
- Longiella J.T. Wynns
- Metaneckera Steere
- Neckera Hedw.
- †Neckerites Ignatov & Perkovsky
- Neckeromnion S. Olsson, Enroth, Huttunen & D. Quandt
- Neckeropsis Reichardt
- Neomacounia Ireland
- Noguchiodendron Ninh & Pócs
- Pendulothecium Enroth & S. He
- Pengchengwua S. Olsson, Enroth, Huttunen & D. Quandt
- Pinnatella M. Fleisch.
- Planicladium S. Olsson, Enroth, Huttunen & D. Quandt
- Porotrichum (Brid.) Hampe
- Pseudanomodon (Limpr.) Ignatov & Fedosov
- Pseudoparaphysanthus (Broth.) S. Olsson, Enroth, Huttunen & D. Quandt
- Pseudopterobryum Broth.
- Shevockia Enroth & M.C. Ji
- Taiwanobryopsis Enroth
- Taiwanobryum Nog.
- Thamnium Schimp.
- Thamnobryum Nieuwl.
- Thamnomalia S. Olsson, Enroth & D. Quandt
- Touwia Ochyra

=== Formerly included ===
- Bissetia Broth. ex M. Fleisch. (now in Miyabeaceae)
- Bryolawtonia D.H. Norris & Enroth (now in Lembophyllaceae)
- Crassiphyllum Ochyra (synonym of Thamnobryum)
- Cryptopodia Röhl. (synonym of Neckera)
- Distichia (Brid.) Brid. (synonym of Neckera)
- Homaliadelphus Dixon & P. de la Varde (now in Miyabeaceae)
- Limbella (Müll. Hal.) Renauld & Cardot (now in Amblystegiaceae)
- Lomoporotrichum Müll. Hal. (synonym of Pseudoparaphysanthus)
- Neckeradelphus Laz. (synonym of Forsstroemia)
- Orthostichella Müll. Hal. (now in Orthostichellaceae)
- Parathamnium (M. Fleisch.) Ochyra (synonym of Touwia)
- Porothamnium M. Fleisch. (synonym of Porotrichum)

Unplaced

- Dendro-leskea Hampe
