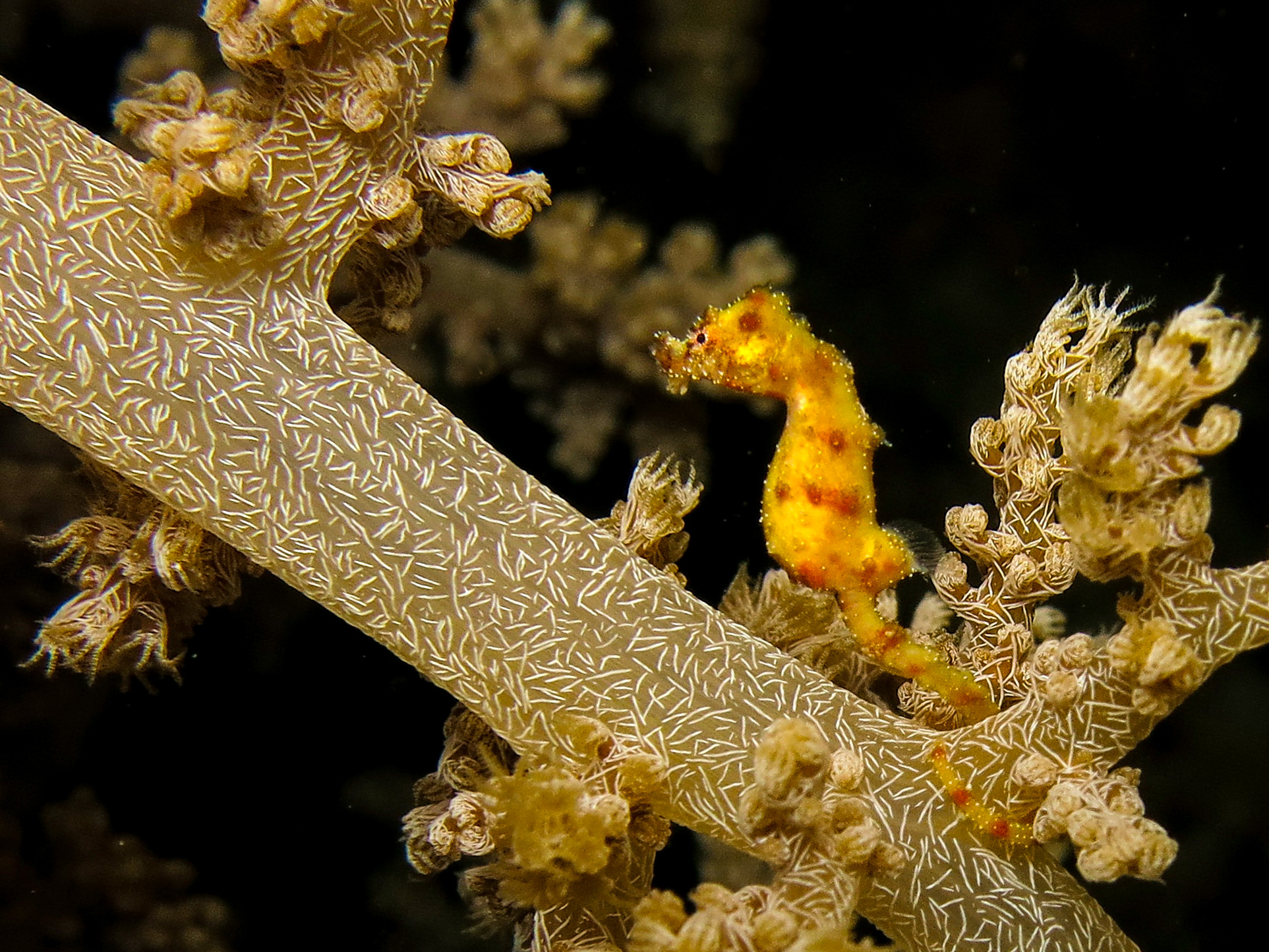

Conservation status
- Critically Endangered (IUCN 3.1)
- CITES Appendix II

Scientific classification
- Kingdom: Animalia
- Phylum: Chordata
- Class: Actinopterygii
- Order: Syngnathiformes
- Family: Syngnathidae
- Genus: Hippocampus
- Species: H. waleananus

Binomial name
- Hippocampus waleananus M. F. Gomon & Kuiter, 2009

= Hippocampus waleananus =

Species of fish

Hippocampus waleananus, the Walea pygmy seahorse, is a species of seahorse endemic to the Togian Islands in Indonesia, and is associated with specific soft corals. The species was described in 2009 from a single specimen which was found close to the island of Walea. A 2016 classification considered it a synonym of Hippocampus satomiae, Lourie & Kuiter, 2008 due to lack of sufficient morphological differences, but following a reevaluation it is now recognised as a distinct species.
