= Hippocampus dahli =

Lowcrown seahorse

Conservation status
- Least Concern (IUCN 3.1)
- CITES Appendix II (CITES)

Scientific classification
- Kingdom: Animalia
- Phylum: Chordata
- Class: Actinopterygii
- Order: Syngnathiformes
- Family: Syngnathidae
- Genus: Hippocampus
- Species: H. dahli

Binomial name
- Hippocampus dahli Ogilby, 1908

Species of fish

Hippocampus dahli (lowcrown seahorse) is a fish species of the family Syngnathidae. It is endemic to the Australian northeastern coast, from Darwin to Brisbane, where it inhabits estuarine channels and rubble or soft substrates to depths of 21 metres (69 ft). Little is known of its feeding habits, but it is likely to feed on small crustaceans such as copepods, amphipods, and gammarid, caprellid, and caridean shrimps, similar to other seahorses. This species is ovoviviparous, with males carrying eggs in a brood pouch before giving birth to live young. This species is not listed in FishBase and many authorities treat it as a synonym of Hippocampus trimaculatus.

== Identifying features ==
H. dahli can grow to lengths of about 12 centimetres (4.7 in). Individuals usually have relatively smooth bodies, with low, reduced spines and a low coronet. This species displays sexually dimorphic colour patterns. Females are mostly pale brown to black, often with black scribble marks forming lined, zebra-like patterns. Males are usually dark brown to black with black scribbles.
