= Hippocampus debelius =

Softcoral seahorse

Conservation status
- Near Threatened (IUCN 3.1)
- CITES Appendix II

Scientific classification
- Kingdom: Animalia
- Phylum: Chordata
- Class: Actinopterygii
- Division: Teleostei
- Order: Syngnathiformes
- Family: Syngnathidae
- Genus: Hippocampus
- Species: H. debelius

Binomial name
- Hippocampus debelius M. F. Gomon & Kuiter, 2009

Species of fish

Hippocampus debelius, commonly known as the softcoral seahorse, is a species of marine fish of the family Syngnathidae. It is known from only two specimens collected from the Gulf of Suez in the Red Sea, at depths of 15–30 metres (49–98 ft). Individuals were found associated with soft corals. Although little is known of this species, it is expected to feed on crustaceans, similar to other seahorses. It is also expected to be ovoviviparous, with males carrying eggs in a brood pouch before giving birth to live young.

== Identification ==
Individuals collected were around 2.4 centimetres (0.94 in) in length. They have a medium snout with a bulbous tip, a low, angular coronet, and long slender spines on the head, trunk and tail. Spines have dark brown or black tips.

== Naming ==
The specific name honors the Frankfurt am Main born German naturalist Helmut Debelius who is the author of several books on marine life, although he started his working life as a policeman.
