= Hippocampus jugumus =

Conservation status
- Data Deficient (IUCN 3.1)
- CITES Appendix II (CITES)

Scientific classification
- Kingdom: Animalia
- Phylum: Chordata
- Class: Actinopterygii
- Order: Syngnathiformes
- Family: Syngnathidae
- Genus: Hippocampus
- Species: H. jugumus

Binomial name
- Hippocampus jugumus Kuiter, 2001

Species of fish

Hippocampus jugumus, the collared seahorse, was described in 2001 from a single specimen found in the waters surrounding Lord Howe Island.
