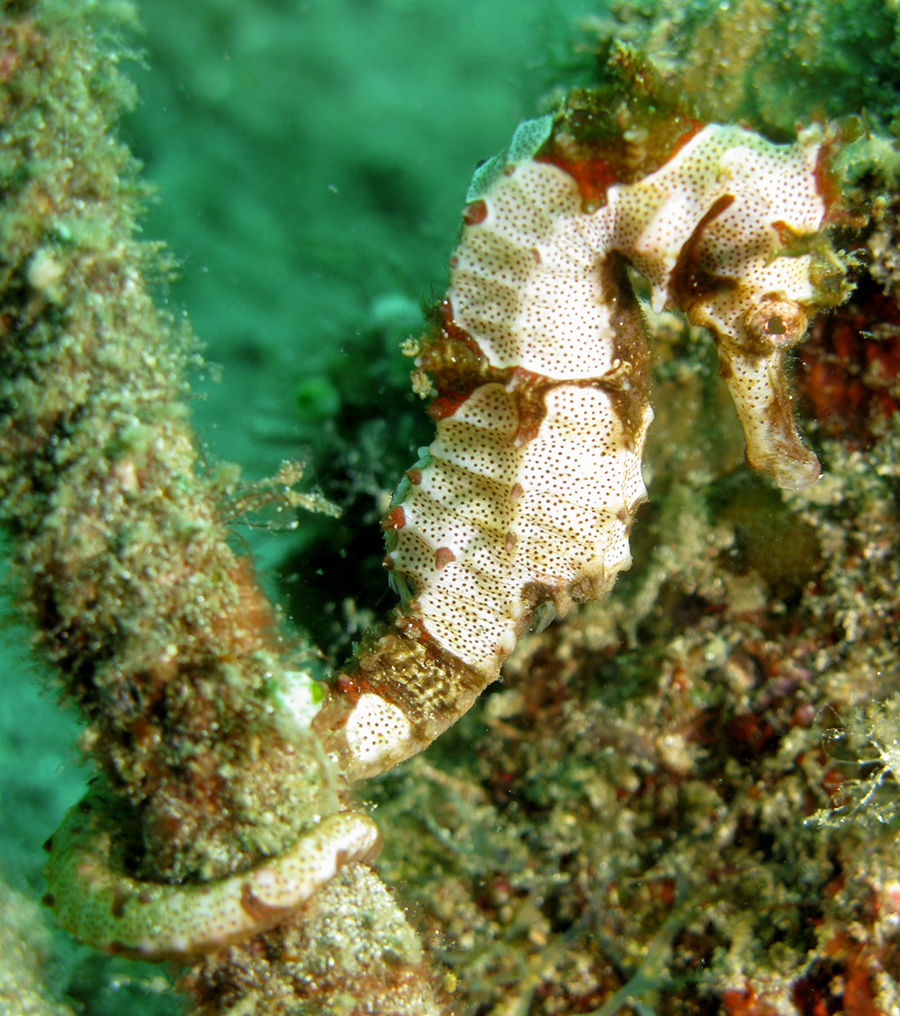

Conservation status
- Vulnerable (IUCN 3.1)
- CITES Appendix II (CITES)

Scientific classification
- Kingdom: Animalia
- Phylum: Chordata
- Class: Actinopterygii
- Order: Syngnathiformes
- Family: Syngnathidae
- Genus: Hippocampus
- Species: H. spinosissimus

Binomial name
- Hippocampus spinosissimus M. C. W. Weber, 1913

Synonyms
- Hippocampus aimei Roule, 1916; Hippocampus alatus Kuiter, 2001; Hippocampus queenslandicus Horne, 2001; Hippocampus semispinosus Kuiter, 2001

= Hedgehog seahorse =

Species of fish

The hedgehog seahorse (Hippocampus spinosissimus) is a species of fish of the family Syngnathidae. It inhabits coastal waters from India and Sri Lanka to Taiwan and northern Australia. It is threatened by overfishing, as both targeted catch and bycatch. This species is ovoviviparous, with males carrying eggs in a brood pouch before giving birth to live young.

== Identification ==
Hippocampus spinosissimus is usually around 12.5 centimetres (4.9 in) long, with a long snout and a low coronet. Spines vary through life, with juveniles being more spiny than adults. Individuals usually have a yellow-orange to deep red or dark brown snout, a dark front of head, and pale grey saddles or bands over the trunk and tail. Deepwater specimens are usually red or orange, likely to match the sponges and corals at that depth.

== Habitat ==
Hippocampus spinosissimus inhabits reef systems, occupying sand or silt bottoms, to a maximum depth of 70 metres (230 ft). In the central Philippines, individuals are most commonly found on relatively barren soft or sandy bottoms and depressions, where they associate with octocorals, sea stars, sea pens, sea urchins, sponges, submerged wood and macroalgae. They are rarely found in direct association with reefs or hard corals. Trawls in Malaysia indicate similar habitat choice.

== Ecology ==
=== Feeding ===
This species is carnivorous, feeding on small crustaceans such as copepods, amphipods, and gammarid, caprellid, and caridean shrimps, as well as other planktonic invertebrates.

=== Reproduction and growth ===
Hippocampus spinosissimus is an ovoviviparous species, with the female using an ovipositor to transfer eggs to an enclosed brood pouch on the male's stomach. The male then fertilizes and protects the developing embryos before giving birth to tiny (5.63 millimetres (0.222 in)) independent young. Individuals reach sexual maturity when they are around 10.4 centimetres (4.1 in).

== Population ==
Although there have been no dedicated population estimates for H. spinosissimus, analyses of seahorse trade and fisher surveys suggest population declines of at least 30% in the past 10 years. In specific areas these declines can be even more significant, with 80% population decline over two months occurring in the central Philippines due to targeted fishing.

== Threats ==
The major threat to H. spinosissimus is overfishing. It is caught as bycatch in many artisanal and commercial fisheries throughout its range, such as in Cambodia, Malaysia, Thailand, the Philippines and Vietnam. This species is one of the two most heavily reported species in trade - an indicator of the high levels of exploitation pressure from bycatch that is exerted on it.

== Conservation ==
All Hippocampus species are listed under Appendix II of the Convention on International Trade in Endangered Species of Wild Fauna and Flora (CITES), which regulates the export of seahorses. Signed countries are meant to provide permits for seahorse exports, and ensure that these exports are not harmful to wild populations. This, however, becomes difficult when population information is unavailable and authorities cannot assess the sustainability of their seahorse exploitation. The challenge is increased further by the fact that most seahorses are caught as bycatch, so imposing export quotas has little effect on the impact to seahorses. Therefore, it is important that we gather information regarding the spatial and temporal distributions of seahorses, so that area restrictions can be imposed that are most effective in conserving populations.
