= Hippocampus colemani =

Coleman's pygmy seahorse

Conservation status
- Data Deficient (IUCN 3.1)
- CITES Appendix II

Scientific classification
- Kingdom: Animalia
- Phylum: Chordata
- Class: Actinopterygii
- Order: Syngnathiformes
- Family: Syngnathidae
- Genus: Hippocampus
- Species: H. colemani

Binomial name
- Hippocampus colemani Kuiter, 2003

Species of fish

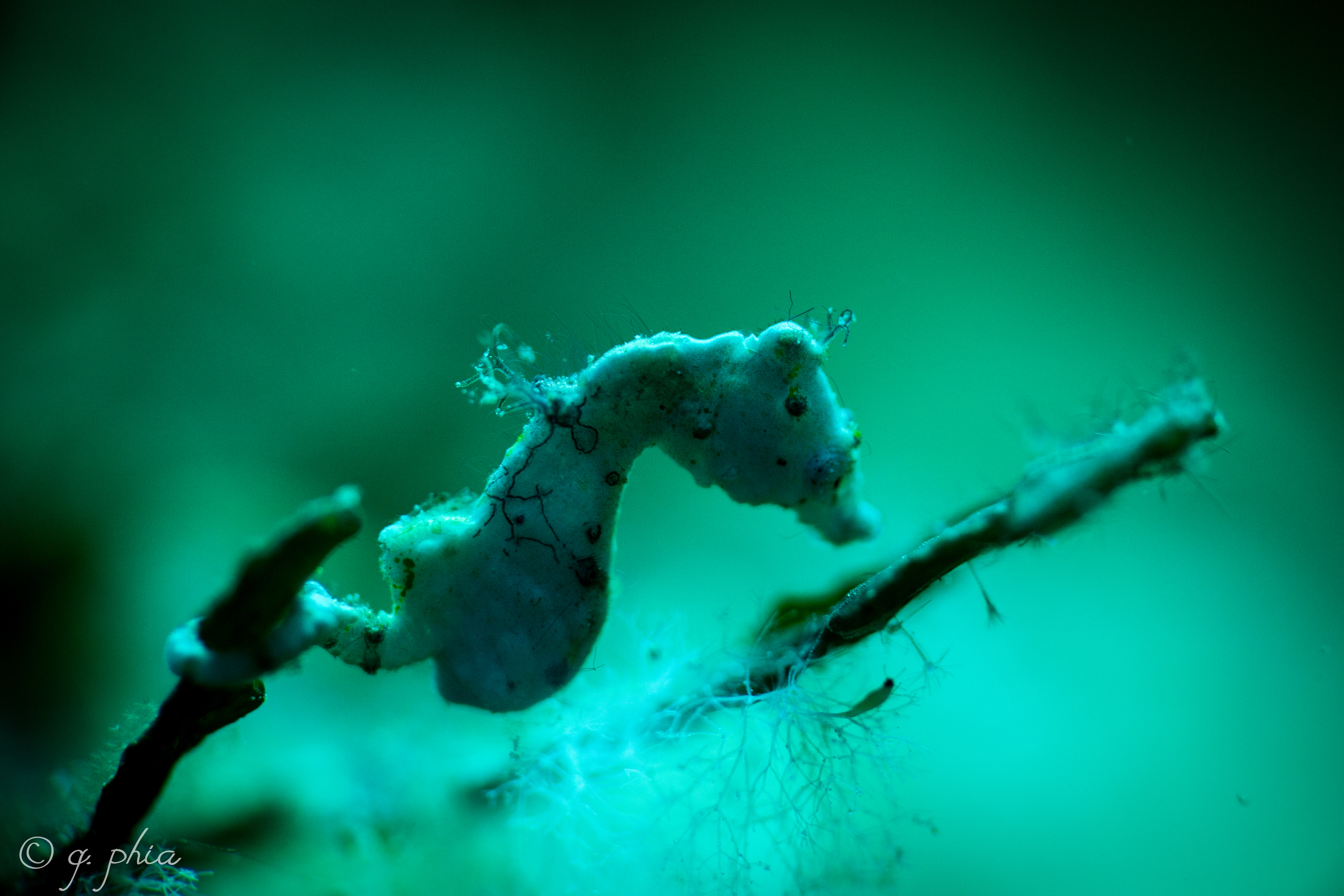
A picture of Halameda pygmy seahorse eating at the table coral city, wakatobi, 2018

Hippocampus colemani (Coleman's pygmy seahorse) is a species of fish of the family Syngnathidae. It is found off of the coast of Lord Howe Island, Australia, although unconfirmed occurrences have been reported from Milne Bay and the Ryukyu Islands. It lives in coarse sand and Zostera and Halophila sea grasses at depths around 4–12 m (13–39 ft). It is expected to feed on small crustaceans, similar to other seahorses. Ovoviviparous reproduction is also expected, with males brooding eggs in a pouch before giving birth to live young.

Named after Neville Coleman, an Australian photographer, explorer, and conservationist who collected the holotype.

== Identification ==
Individuals of this species are tiny, growing to a maximum recorded length of 2.7 centimetres (1.1 in). They have small heads, short snouts, thick trunks, and low coronets. Algae that are found on seagrass blades attach to their skins, acting as a form of camouflage. Colouration is generally pale whitish to yellowish, with white circular or elliptical markings outlined with narrow red lines on the trunk, dusky brown bands radiating from the eye, brownish-red appendages, and a slightly brownish tail with red markings.
