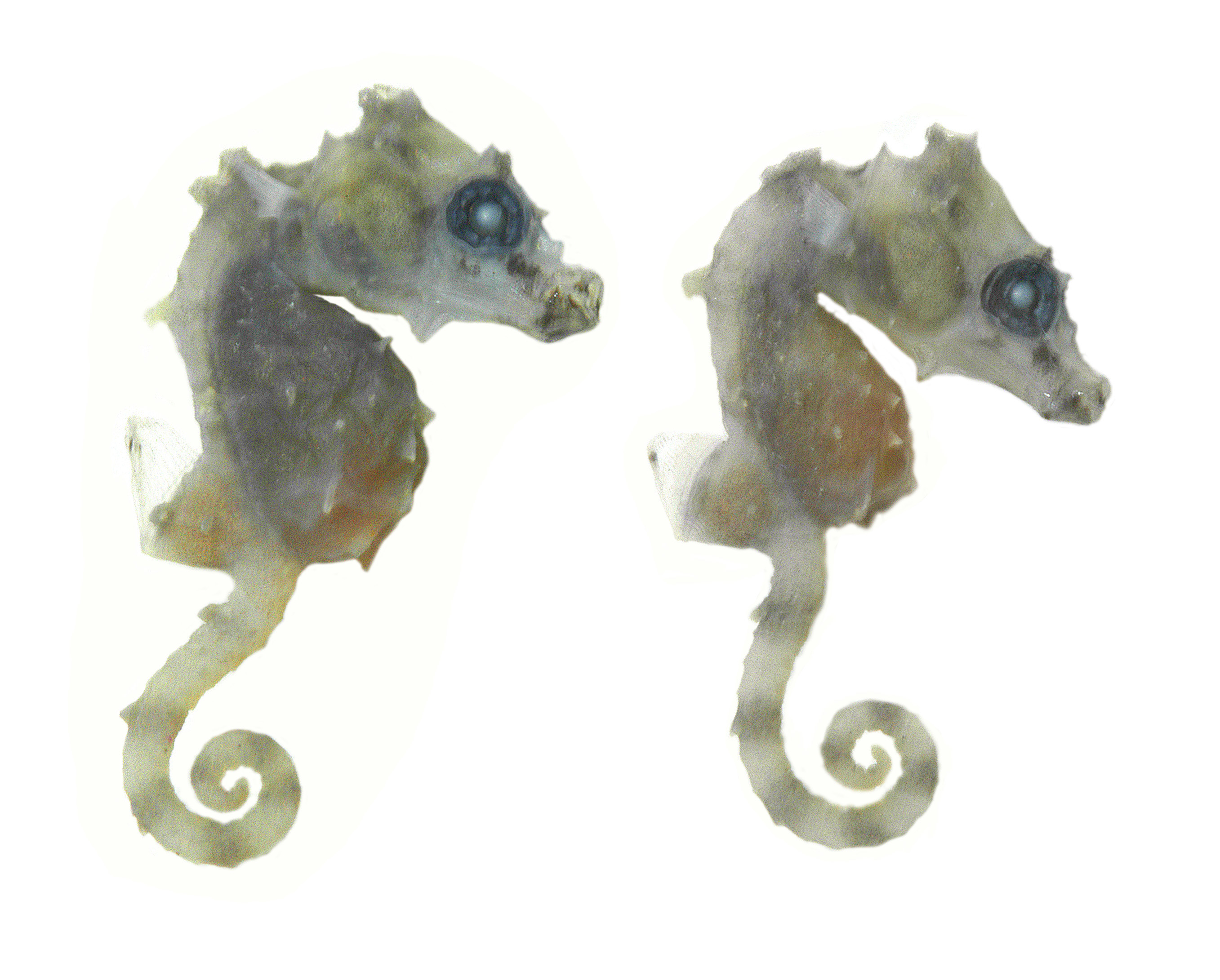
- The holotype of Hippocampus satomiae

Conservation status
- Data Deficient (IUCN 3.1)
- CITES Appendix II (CITES)

Scientific classification
- Kingdom: Animalia
- Phylum: Chordata
- Class: Actinopterygii
- Order: Syngnathiformes
- Family: Syngnathidae
- Genus: Hippocampus
- Species: H. satomiae

Binomial name
- Hippocampus satomiae Lourie & Kuiter, 2008

Synonyms
- Hippocampus waleananus M. F. Gomon & Kuiter, 2009

= Satomi's pygmy seahorse =

Species of fish

Satomi's pygmy seahorse (Hippocampus satomiae) is the smallest known seahorse in the world with an average length of 13.8 millimetres (0.54 in) and an approximate height of 11.5 millimetres (0.45 in).

This member of the family Syngnathidae is found at the Derawan Islands off Kalimantan. This species name, H. satomiae, is in honour of Satomi Onishi, the dive guide who collected the type specimens.

Hippocampus satomiae was selected as one of "The Top 10 New Species" described in 2009 by The International Institute for Species Exploration at Arizona State University and an international committee of taxonomists. The specific name honours Miss Satomi Onishi, a dive guide, who collected the type specimens.

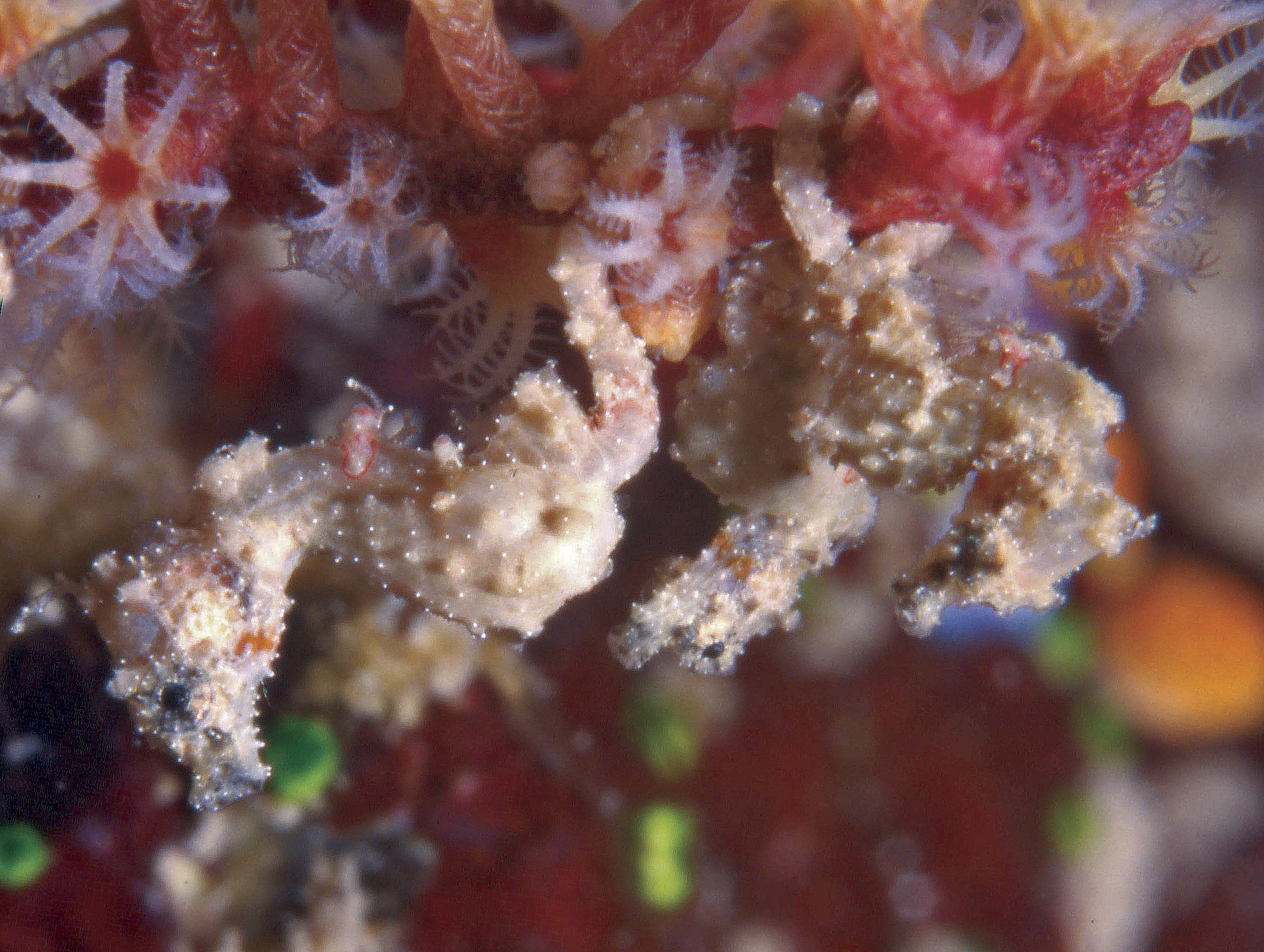
Hippocampus satomiae attached to a coral
