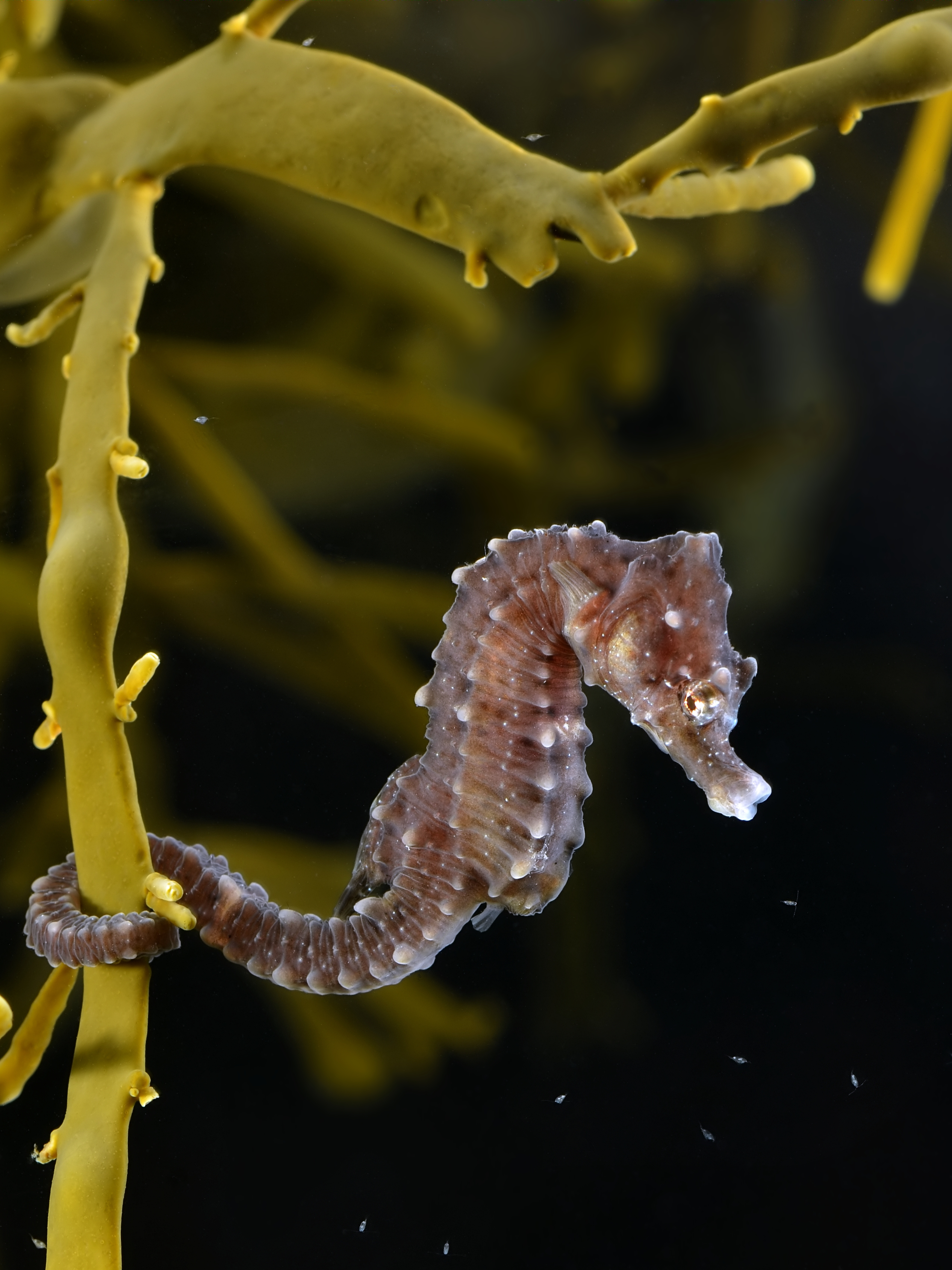
- Short-snouted seahorse (Hippocampus hippocampus)

Scientific classification
- Kingdom: Animalia
- Phylum: Chordata
- Class: Actinopterygii
- Division: Teleostei
- Order: Syngnathiformes
- Family: Syngnathidae
- Tribe: Hippocampini
- Genus: Hippocampus; Rafinesque, 1810

Type species
- Syngnathus hippocampus Linnaeus, 1758

Species
- see Species.

Synonyms
- Acentronura Kaup, 1853; Farlapiscis Whitley, 1931; Jamsus Ginsburg, 1937; Macleayina Fowler, 1907; Phyllopteryx Swainson 1839

= Seahorse =

Seahorses Temporal range: Lower Miocene to present – 23–0 Ma

Genus of bony fishes

A seahorse (also written sea-horse and sea horse) is any of 47 species of small marine bony fish in the genus Hippocampus. Having a head and neck suggestive of a horse, seahorses also feature segmented bony armour, an upright posture and a curled prehensile tail. Along with the pipefishes, sea muppets (Australyichthys), and seadragons (Phycodurus and Phyllopteryx) they form the family Syngnathidae. They can be found in seas, brackish estuaries and lagoons.

== Etymology ==
The genus name comes from the Ancient Greek ἱππόκαμπος hippókampos itself from ἵππος híppos meaning "horse" and κάμπος kámpos meaning "sea monster" or "sea animal".

== Evolutionary history ==
=== Evolution and fossil record ===
Anatomical evidence, supported by molecular, physical, and genetic evidence, demonstrates that seahorses are highly modified pipefish. The fossil record of seahorses, however, is very sparse. The best known and best studied fossils are specimens of Hippocampus guttulatus (though literature more commonly refers to them under the synonym of H. ramulosus), from the Marecchia River formation of Rimini Province, Italy, dating back to the Lower Pliocene, about 3 million years ago. The earliest known seahorse fossils are of two pipefish-like species, H. sarmaticus and H. slovenicus, from the coprolitic horizon of Tunjice Hills, a middle Miocene lagerstätte in Slovenia dating back about 13 million years.

Molecular dating implies that pipefish and seahorses diverged during the Late Oligocene. This has led to speculation that seahorses evolved in response to large areas of shallow water, newly created as the result of tectonic events. The shallow water would have allowed the expansion of seagrass habitats that served as camouflage for the seahorses' upright posture. These tectonic changes occurred in the western Pacific Ocean, pointing to an origin there, with molecular data suggesting two later, separate invasions of the Atlantic Ocean. In 2016, a study published in Nature found the seahorse genome to be the most rapidly evolving fish genome studied so far.

The evolution of seahorses from pipefish may have been an adaptation related to the biomechanics of prey capture. The unique posture of the seahorse allows them to capture small shrimps at larger distances than the pipefish is capable of.

== Description ==
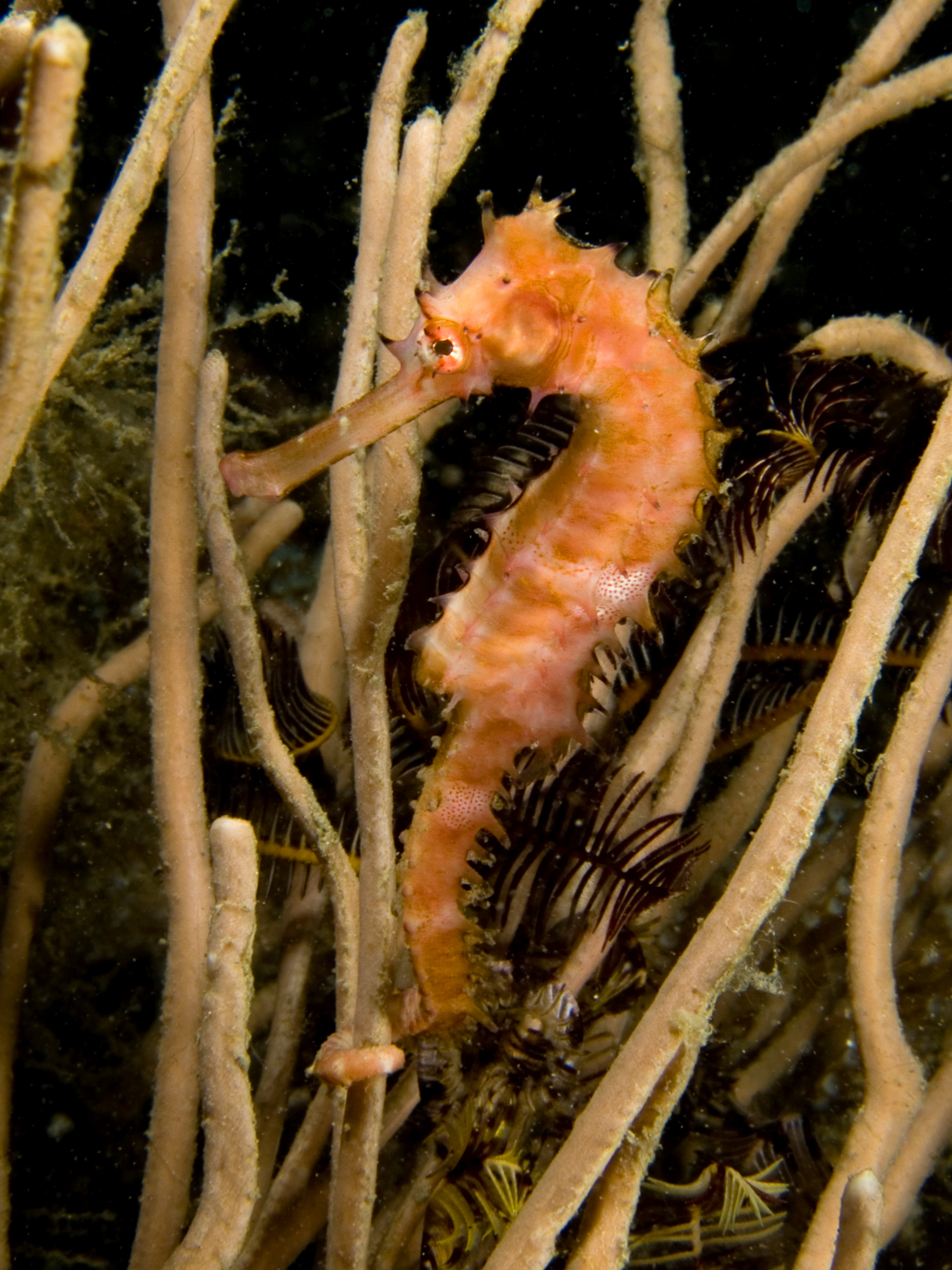
Spiny seahorse H. histrix from East Timor holding on to soft coral with its prehensile tail

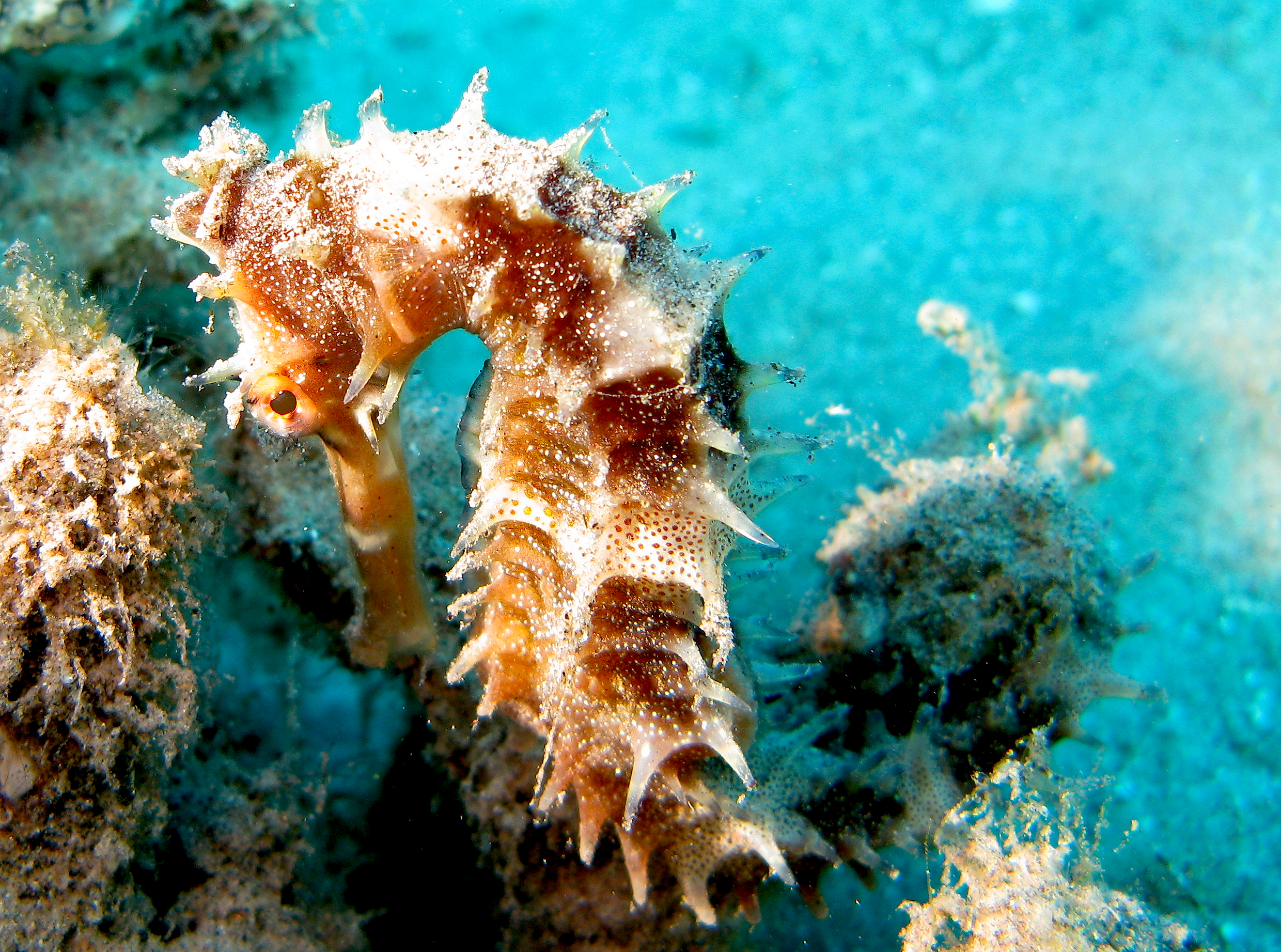
H. jayakari

Seahorses range in size from 1.5 to 35 cm (0.6 to 13.8 in). They are named for their equine appearance, with bent necks and long snouted heads and a distinctive trunk and tail. Although they are bony fish, they do not have scales, but rather thin skin stretched over a series of bony plates, which are arranged in rings throughout their bodies. Each species has a distinct number of rings. The armor of bony plates also protects them against predators, and because of this outer skeleton, they no longer have ribs. Seahorses swim upright, propelling themselves using the dorsal fin, another characteristic not shared by their close pipefish relatives, which swim horizontally. Razorfish are the only other fish that swim vertically. The pectoral fins, located on either side of the head behind their eyes, are used for steering. They lack the caudal fin typical of fishes. Their prehensile tail is composed of square-like rings. They are adept at camouflage, and can grow and reabsorb spiny appendages depending on their habitat.

Unusual among fish, a seahorse has a flexible, well-defined neck. It also sports a crown-like spine or horn on its head, termed a "coronet", which is distinct for each species.

Seahorses swim extremely poorly, rapidly fluttering a dorsal fin and using pectoral fins to steer. The slowest-moving fish in the world is H. zosterae (the dwarf seahorse), with a top speed of about 1.5 m (5 ft) per hour. Since they are poor swimmers, they are most likely to be found resting with their prehensile tail wound around a stationary object. They have long snouts, which they use to suck up food, and their eyes can move independently of each other like those of a chameleon.

=== Camouflage ===
Chromatophores are the cells located in the skin that allow them to physically change color. Biochromes of different colors are displayed within these chromatophores. So through the varying combinations and concentrations of these pigments, the seahorse is able to change its color for a particular purpose. The chromatophore is ultimately controlled by hormones and/or the nervous system.

== Habitat ==
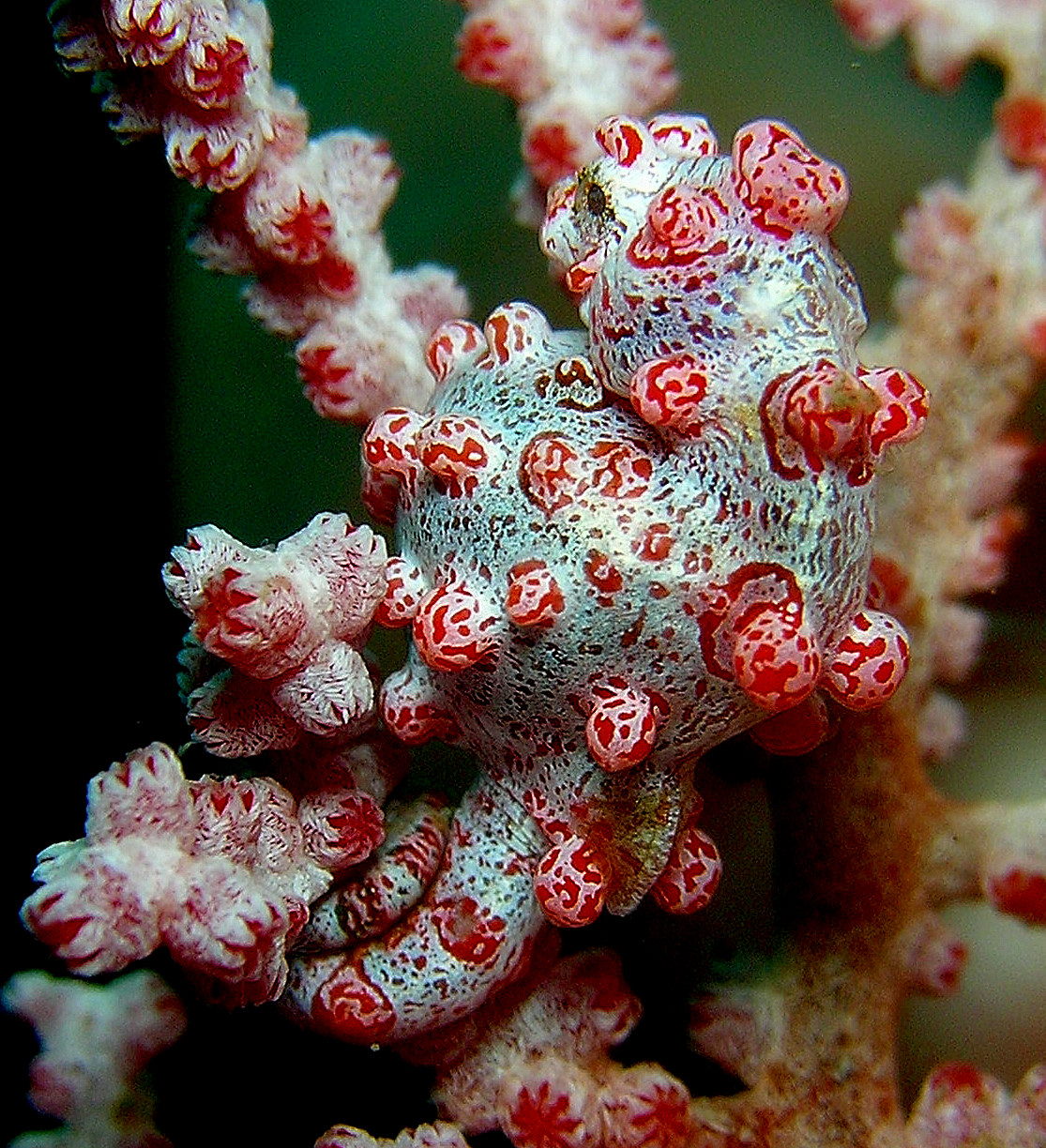
Seahorse hiding using camouflage

Seahorses are mainly found in shallow tropical and temperate salt water throughout the world, from about 45°S to 45°N. They live in sheltered areas such as seagrass beds, estuaries, coral reefs, and mangroves. Some species can be found rafting in clumps of sargassum far away from their original ranges, some may spend their entire lifetimes around local sea fans.

Four species are found in Pacific waters from North America to South America. In the Atlantic, Hippocampus erectus ranges from Nova Scotia to Uruguay. H. zosterae, known as the dwarf seahorse, is found in the Bahamas.

Colonies of Short-snouted Seahorse have been found in European waters, such as the Thames Estuary in England.

Two species live in the Mediterranean Sea: H. guttulatus (the long-snouted seahorse), and H. hippocampus (the short-snouted seahorse). These species form territories; males stay within 1 m^{2} (10 sq ft) of habitat, while females range over about one hundred times that.

== Feeding habits ==
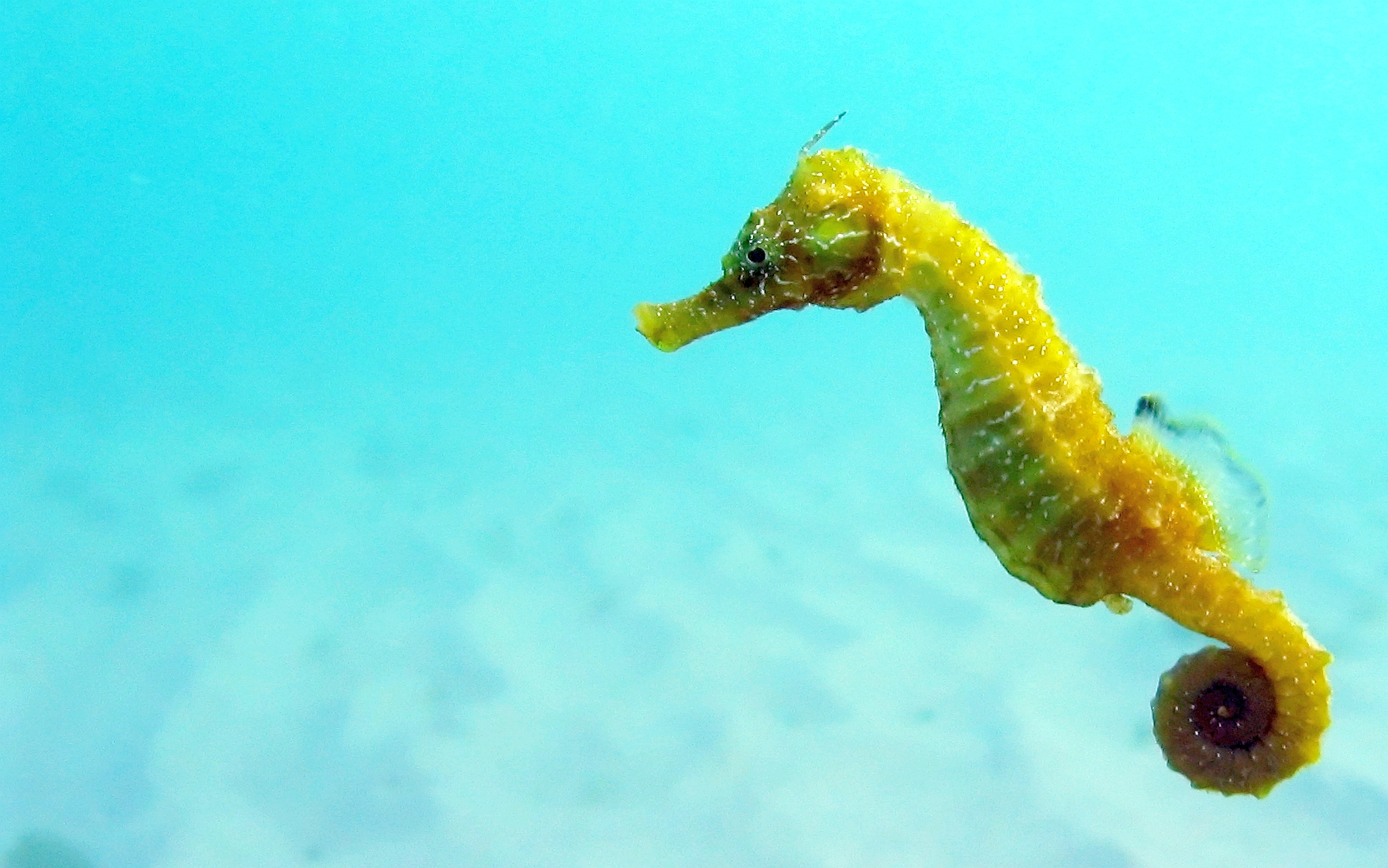
Seahorses rely on stealth to ambush small prey such as copepods. They use pivot feeding to catch the copepod, which involves rotating their snout at high speed and then sucking in the copepod.

Seahorses use their long snouts to eat their food with ease. However, they are slow to consume their food and have extremely simple digestive systems that lack a stomach, so they must eat constantly to stay alive. Seahorses feed on small crustaceans floating in the water or crawling on the bottom. With excellent camouflage, seahorses ambush prey that floats within striking range, sitting and waiting until an optimal moment. Mysid shrimp and other small crustaceans are favorites, but some seahorses have been observed eating other kinds of invertebrates and larval fish. One study found that their distinctive head morphology gave them a hydrodynamic advantage by minimizing interference while approaching evasive prey. Thus the seahorse can get very close to the copepods on which it preys. Seahorses have three distinctive feeding phases: preparatory, expansive, and recovery. During the preparatory phase, the seahorse slowly approaches the prey while in an upright position, after which it slowly flexes its head ventrally. In the expansive phase, the seahorse captures its prey by simultaneously elevating its head, expanding the buccal cavity, and sucking in the prey item. During the recovery phase, the jaws, head, and hyoid apparatus of the seahorse return to their original positions. The phased prey capture mechanism is known as pivot-feeding.

The amount of available cover influences the seahorse's feeding behaviour. For example, in wild areas with small amounts of vegetation, seahorses will sit and wait, but an environment with extensive vegetation will prompt the seahorse to inspect its environment, feeding while swimming rather than sitting and waiting. Conversely, in an aquarium setting with little vegetation, the seahorse will fully inspect its environment and makes no attempt to sit and wait.

== Reproduction ==
Seahorse life-cycle

The male seahorse is equipped with a brood pouch on the ventral, or front-facing, side of the tail. When mating, the female seahorse deposits up to 1,500 eggs in the male's pouch. The male carries the eggs for 9 to 45 days until the seahorses are released into the water fully developed, but very small. The male often mates again within hours or days during the breeding season.

=== Courtship ===
Before breeding, seahorses may court for several days. Scientists believe the courtship behavior synchronizes the animals' movements and reproductive states, so that the male can receive the eggs when the female is ready to deposit them. During this time, they may change color, swim side by side holding tails or grip the same strand of sea grass with their tails, and wheel around in unison in what is known as a "predawn dance". They eventually engage in a "true courtship dance" lasting about 8 hours, during which the male pumps water through the egg pouch on his trunk which expands and opens to display its emptiness. When the female's eggs reach maturity, she and her mate let go of any anchors and drift upward snout-to-snout, out of the sea grass, often spiraling as they rise. They interact for about 6 minutes, reminiscent of courtship. The female inserts her ovipositor into the male's brood pouch and deposits dozens to thousands of eggs. As the female releases her eggs, her body slims while his swells. Both animals then sink back into the sea grass and she swims away.

==== Phases of courtship ====
Seahorses exhibit four phases of courtship that are indicated by clear behavioral changes and changes in the intensity of the courtship act. Phase 1, the initial courtship phase, typically takes place in the early morning one or two days before physical copulation. During this phase the potential mates brighten in colour, quiver, and display rapid side-to-side body vibrations. These displays are performed alternately by both the male and the female seahorse. The following phases, 2 through 4, happen sequentially on the day of copulation. Phase 2 is marked by the female pointing, a behaviour in which the female will raise her head to form an oblique angle with her body. In phase 3 males will also begin the same pointing behaviour in response to the female. Finally, the male and female will repeatedly rise upward together in a water column and end in mid-water copulation, in which the female will transfer her eggs directly into the male's brood pouch.

===== Phase 1: Initial courtship =====
This initial courtship behavior takes place about 30 minutes after dawn on each courtship day, until the day of copulation. During this phase the males and females will remain apart during the night, but after dawn they will come together in a side-by-side position, brighten, and engage in courtship behavior for about 2 to 38 minutes. There is repeated reciprocal quivering. This starts when the male approaches the female, brightens and begins to quiver. The female will follow the male with her own display, in which she will also brighten and quiver about 5 seconds later. As the male quivers, he will rotate his body towards the female who will then rotate her body away. During phase 1 the tails of both seahorses are positioned within 1 cm of each other on the same hold-fast and both of their bodies are angled slightly outward from the point of attachment. However, the female will shift her tail attachment site, causing the pair to circle their common hold-fast.

===== Phase 2: Pointing and pumping =====
This phase begins with the female beginning her pointing posture, by leaning her body towards the male, who will simultaneously lean away and quiver. This phase can last up to 54 minutes. Following phase 2 is a latency period (typically between 30 minutes and four hours), during which the seahorses display no courtship behaviour and females are not bright; males will usually display a pumping motion with their body.

===== Phase 3: Pointing – pointing =====
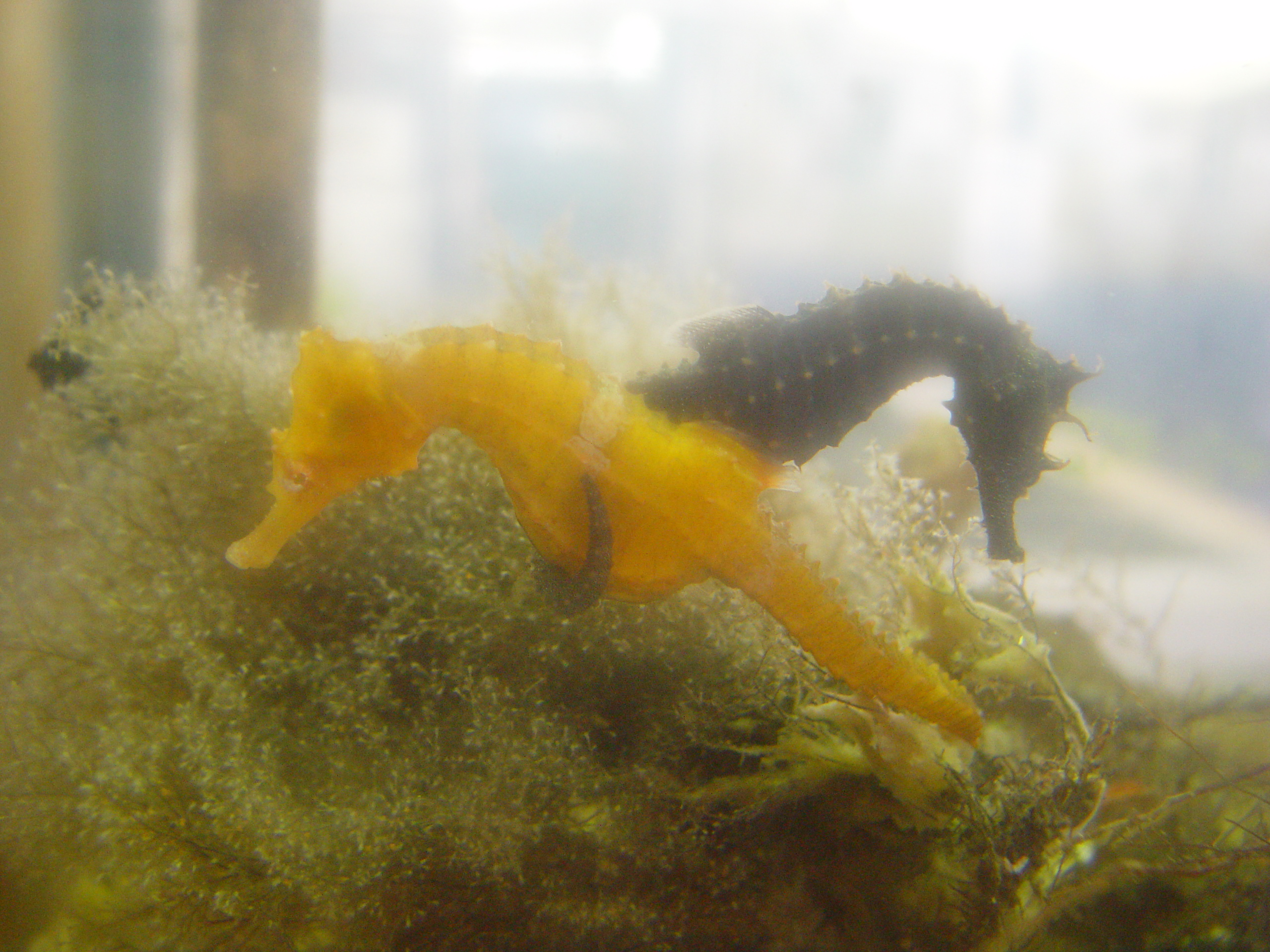
Seahorses in phase 1 of courtship

The third phase begins with the females brightening and assuming the pointing position. The males respond with their own brightening and pointing display. This phase ends with the male departing. It usually lasts nine minutes and can occur one to six times during courtship.

===== Phase 4: Rising and copulation =====
The final courtship phase includes 5–8 bouts of courtship. Each bout of courtship begins with both the male and female anchored to the same plant about 3 cm apart; usually they are facing each other and are still bright in colour from the previous phase. During the first bout, following the facing behaviour, the seahorses will rise upward together anywhere from 2 to 13 cm in a water column. During the final rise, the female will insert her ovipositor and transfer her eggs through an opening into the male's brood pouch.

=== Fertilization ===
During fertilization in Hippocampus kuda, the brood pouch was found to be open for only six seconds while egg deposition occurred. During this time seawater entered the pouch where the spermatozoa and eggs meet in a seawater milieu. This hyperosmotic environment facilitates sperm activation and motility. The fertilization is therefore regarded as being physiologically 'external' within a physically 'internal' environment after the closure of the pouch. It is believed that this protected form of fertilization reduces sperm competition among males. Within Syngnathidae (pipefishes and seahorses), protected fertilization has not been documented in the pipefishes but the lack of any distinct differences in the relation of testes size to body size suggests that pipefishes may also have evolved mechanisms for more efficient fertilization with reduced sperm competition.

=== Gestation ===
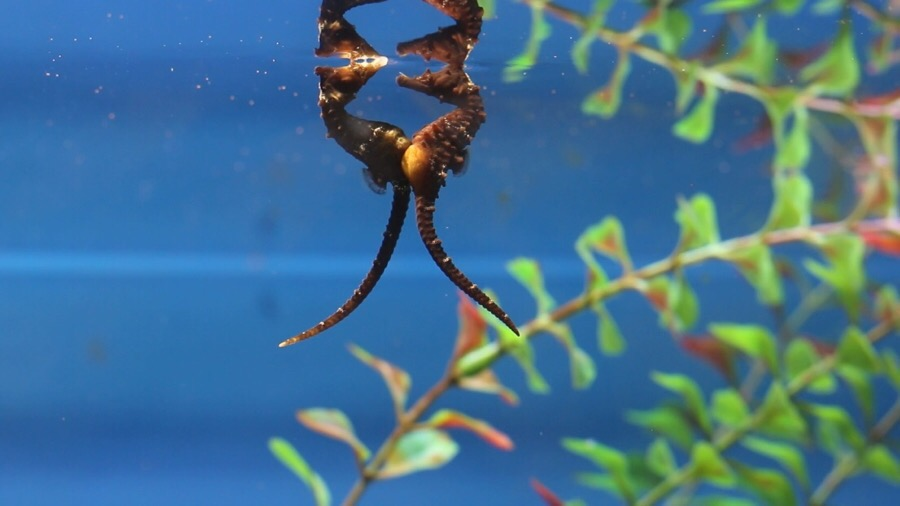
Seahorses in phase 4 of courtship

The fertilized eggs are then embedded in the pouch wall and become surrounded by a spongy tissue. The pouch provides oxygen, as well as a controlled environment incubator. Though the egg yolk contributes nourishment to the developing embryo, the male sea horses contribute additional nutrients such as energy-rich lipids and also calcium to allow them to build their skeletal system, by secreting them into the brood pouch that are absorbed by the embryos. Furthermore, they also offer immunological protection, osmoregulation, gas exchange and waste transport.

The eggs then hatch in the pouch, where the salinity of the water is regulated; this prepares the newborns for life in the sea.

=== Birth ===
The number of young released by the male seahorse averages 100–1000 for most species, but may be as low as 5 for the smaller species, or as high as 2,500. When the fry are ready to be born, the male expels them with muscular contractions. He typically gives birth at night and is ready for the next batch of eggs by morning when his mate returns. Like almost all other fish species, seahorses do not nurture their young after birth. Infants are susceptible to predators or ocean currents which wash them away from feeding grounds or into temperatures too extreme for their delicate bodies. Less than 0.5% of infants survive to adulthood, explaining why litters are so large. These survival rates are actually fairly high compared to other fish, because of their protected gestation, making the process worth the great cost to the father. The eggs of most other fish are abandoned immediately after fertilization.

=== Reproductive roles ===
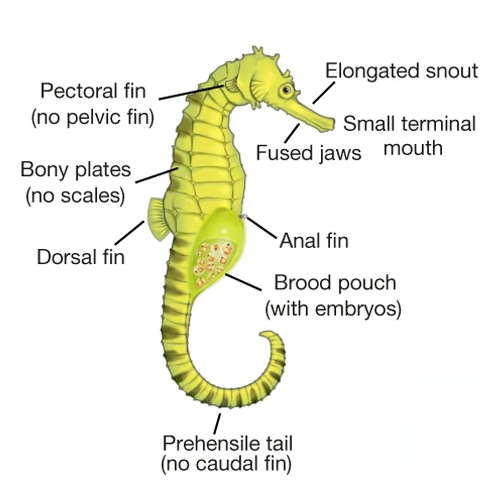
Diagram of a pregnant male seahorse (Hippocampus comes)

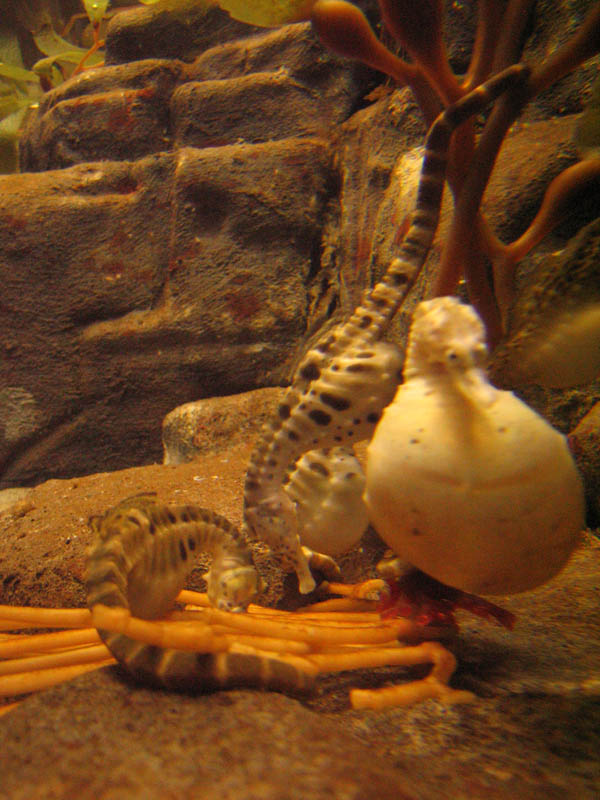
Pregnant male seahorse at the New York Aquarium

Reproduction is energetically costly to the male. This brings into question why the sexual role reversal even takes place. In an environment where one partner incurs more energy costs than the other, Bateman's principle suggests that the lesser contributor takes the role of the aggressor. Male seahorses are more aggressive and sometimes fight for female attention. According to Amanda Vincent of Project Seahorse, only males tail-wrestle and snap their heads at each other. This discovery prompted further study of energy costs. To estimate the female's direct contribution, researchers chemically analyzed the energy stored in each egg. To measure the burden on the males, oxygen consumption was used. By the end of incubation, the male consumed almost 33% more oxygen than before mating. The study concluded that the female's energy expenditure while generating eggs is twice that of males during incubation, confirming the standard hypothesis.

Why the male seahorse (and other members of the Syngnathidae) carries the offspring through gestation is unknown, though some researchers believe it allows for shorter birthing intervals, in turn resulting in more offspring. Given an unlimited number of ready and willing partners, males have the potential to produce 17% more offspring than females in a breeding season. Also, females have "time-outs" from the reproductive cycle 1.2 times longer than those of males. This seems to be based on mate choice, rather than physiology. When the female's eggs are ready, she must lay them in a few hours or eject them into the water column. Making eggs is a huge cost to her physically, since they amount to about a third of her body weight. To protect against losing a clutch, the female demands a long courtship. The daily greetings help to cement the bond between the pair.

=== Monogamy ===
Though seahorses are not known to mate for life, many species form pair bonds that last through at least the breeding season. Some species show a higher level of mate fidelity than others. However, many species readily switch mates when the opportunity arises. H. abdominalis and H. breviceps have been shown to breed in groups, showing no continuous mate preference. Many more species' mating habits have not been studied, so it is unknown how many species are actually monogamous, or how long those bonds actually last.

Although monogamy within fish is not common, it does appear to exist for some. In this case, the mate-guarding hypothesis may be an explanation. This hypothesis states, "males remain with a single female because of ecological factors that make male parental care and protection of offspring especially advantageous." Because the rates of survival for newborn seahorses are so low, incubation is essential. Though not proven, males could have taken on this role because of the lengthy period the females require to produce their eggs. If males incubate while females prepare the next clutch (amounting to a third of body weight), they can reduce the interval between clutches.

== Threats of extinction ==
Coral reefs and seagrass beds are deteriorating due to destructive fishing practices, which reduces viable habitats for seahorses. 70 million seahorse are caught per year, by fishermen from at least 80 countries.

=== Conservation ===
Seahorses are iconic and charismatic animals whose conservation is of global concern. Preserving seahorses' varied habitats, including seagrass beds (such as Posidonia oceanica and Zostera marina), mangroves, coral reefs, estuaries, seaweeds, and all the creatures that inhabit them, is closely related to protecting seahorses. Owing to their widespread use in collective imagery, these fish are popular wildlife viewing destinations, frequently serve as flagship species for international conservation campaigns, and are especially good at attracting public engagement in community scientific projects. According to Woodall et al., these creatures are susceptible to anthropogenic activities such as habitat degradation brought on by residential, commercial, and touristic coastal development, as well as accidental bycatch from damaging fishing equipment like dredges and trawls. There is little ecological data on seahorses because of their low population, seemingly dispersed location, and cryptic behavior. Because of all these traits, seahorses are especially difficult to survey, assess, and monitor in order to enhance their conservation status. Conservation of these fishes depends on an understanding of their threats, distribution, and preferred habitats, which necessitates a thorough understanding of their regional ranges. Finding hotspots and possible hazards, as well as confirming their existence, actually depends on getting a good resolution of their presence and movement to carry out maps on their distribution. Maps can be used to assess future seahorse datasets and to pinpoint regions of study interest where more information can be gathered about the presence, quantity, habitat choice, influence of human activities, and status of seahorses.

== Aquaria ==
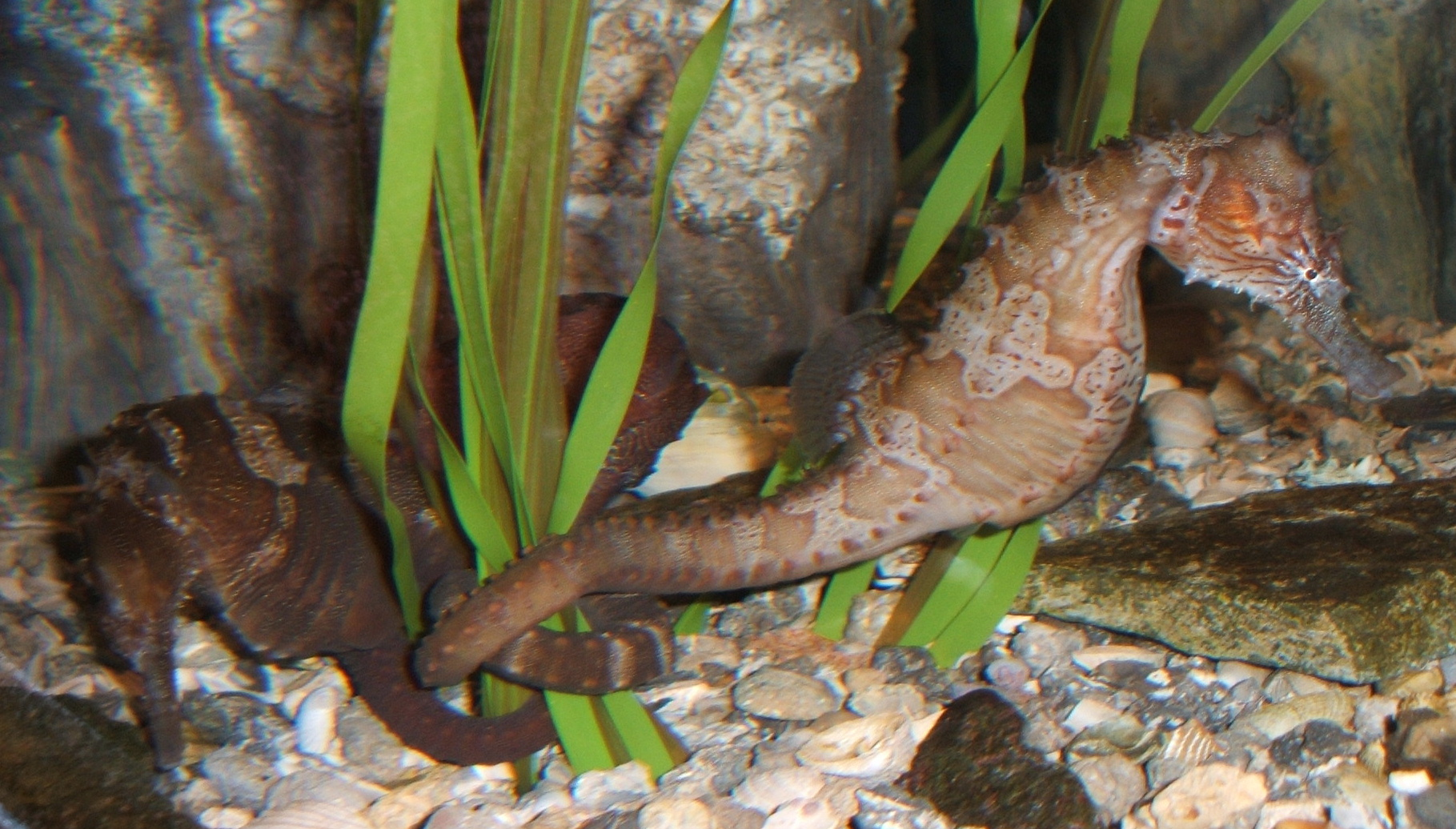
Seahorses (Hippocampus erectus) at the New England Aquarium

While many aquarium hobbyists keep them as pets, seahorses collected from the wild tend to fare poorly in home aquaria. Many eat only live foods such as brine shrimp and are prone to stress, which damages their immune systems and makes them susceptible to disease.

In recent years, however, captive breeding has become more popular. Such seahorses survive better in captivity, and are less likely to carry diseases. They eat frozen mysidacea (crustaceans) that are readily available from aquarium stores, and do not experience the stress of moving out of the wild. Feeding microalgae such as Tisochrysis lutea at the larval stage has shown to significantly increase the weight and weight gain of seahorse larvae. Although captive-bred seahorses are more expensive, they do not impact wild populations.

Seahorses should be kept in an aquarium with low flow and placid tank mates. They are slow feeders, so fast, aggressive feeders will leave them without food. Seahorses can coexist with many species of shrimp and other bottom-feeding creatures. Gobies also make good tank-mates. Keepers are generally advised to avoid eels, tangs, triggerfish, squid, octopus, and sea anemones.

Water quality is very important for the survival of seahorses in an aquarium. They are delicate species which should not be added to a new tank. The water parameters are recommended to be as follows although these fish may acclimatise to different water over time:

- Temperature: 23–28 °C (73–82 °F)
- pH: 8.1–8.4
- Ammonia: 0 mg/L (0 ppm) (0.01 mg/L (0.01 ppm) may be tolerated for short periods)
- Nitrite: 0 mg/L (0 ppm) (0.125 mg/L (0.125 ppm) may be tolerated for short periods)
- S.G.: 1.021–1.024 at 23–24 °C (73–75 °F)

A water-quality problem will affect fish behaviour and can be shown by clamped fins, reduced feeding, erratic swimming, and gasping at the surface. Seahorses require vertical swimming space to perform reproductive functions and to prevent depth-related health conditions like gas bubble disease, so a refugium that is at least 20 inches by 51 centimeters deep is recommended inside an aquarium.

Animals sold as "freshwater seahorses" are usually the closely related pipefish, of which a few species live in the lower reaches of rivers. The supposed true "freshwater seahorse" called H. aimei is not a valid species, but a synonym sometimes used for Barbour's and hedgehog seahorses. The latter, which is often confused with the former, can be found in estuarine environments, but is not actually a freshwater fish.

== Consumption ==
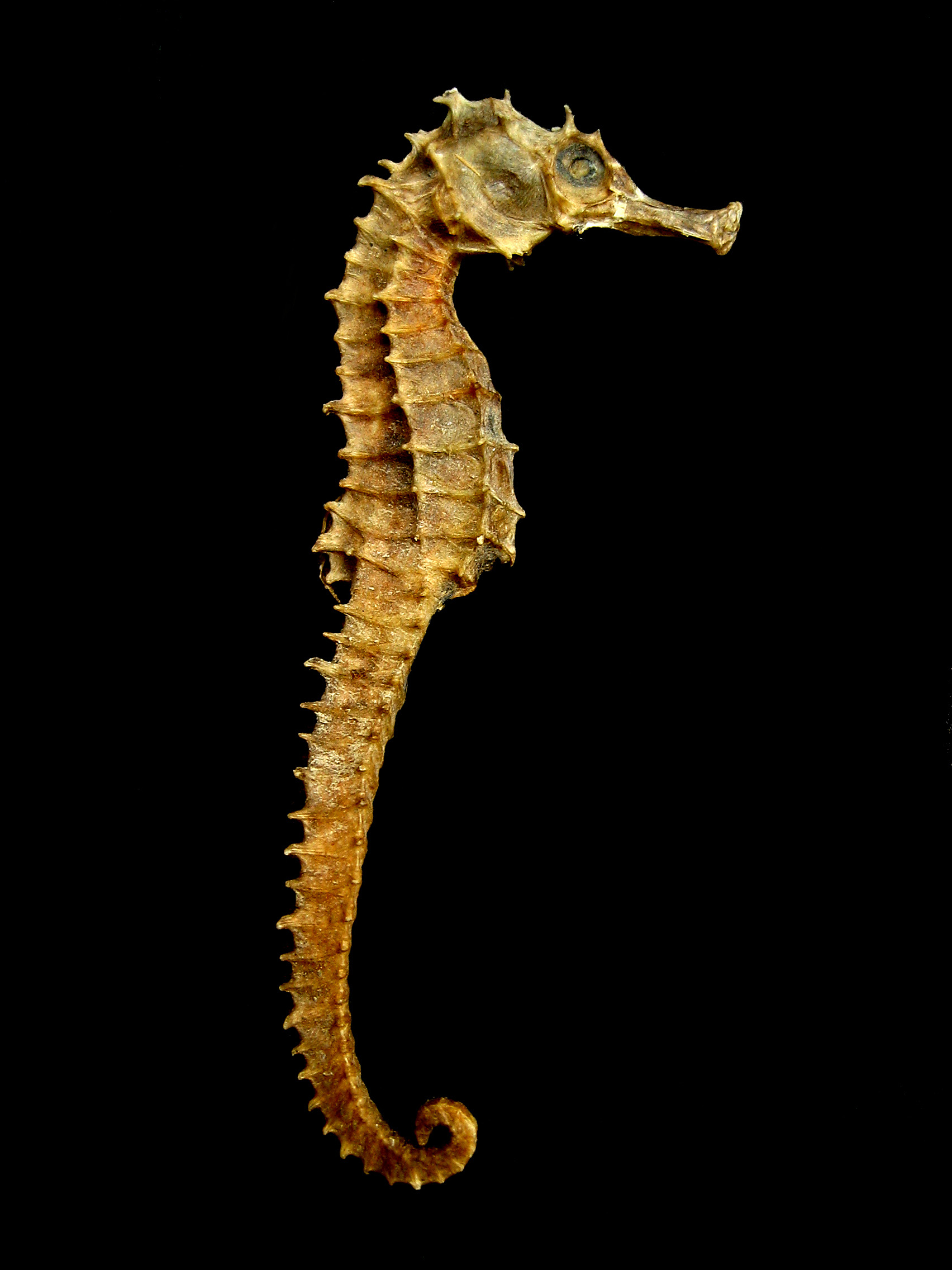
Dried seahorse

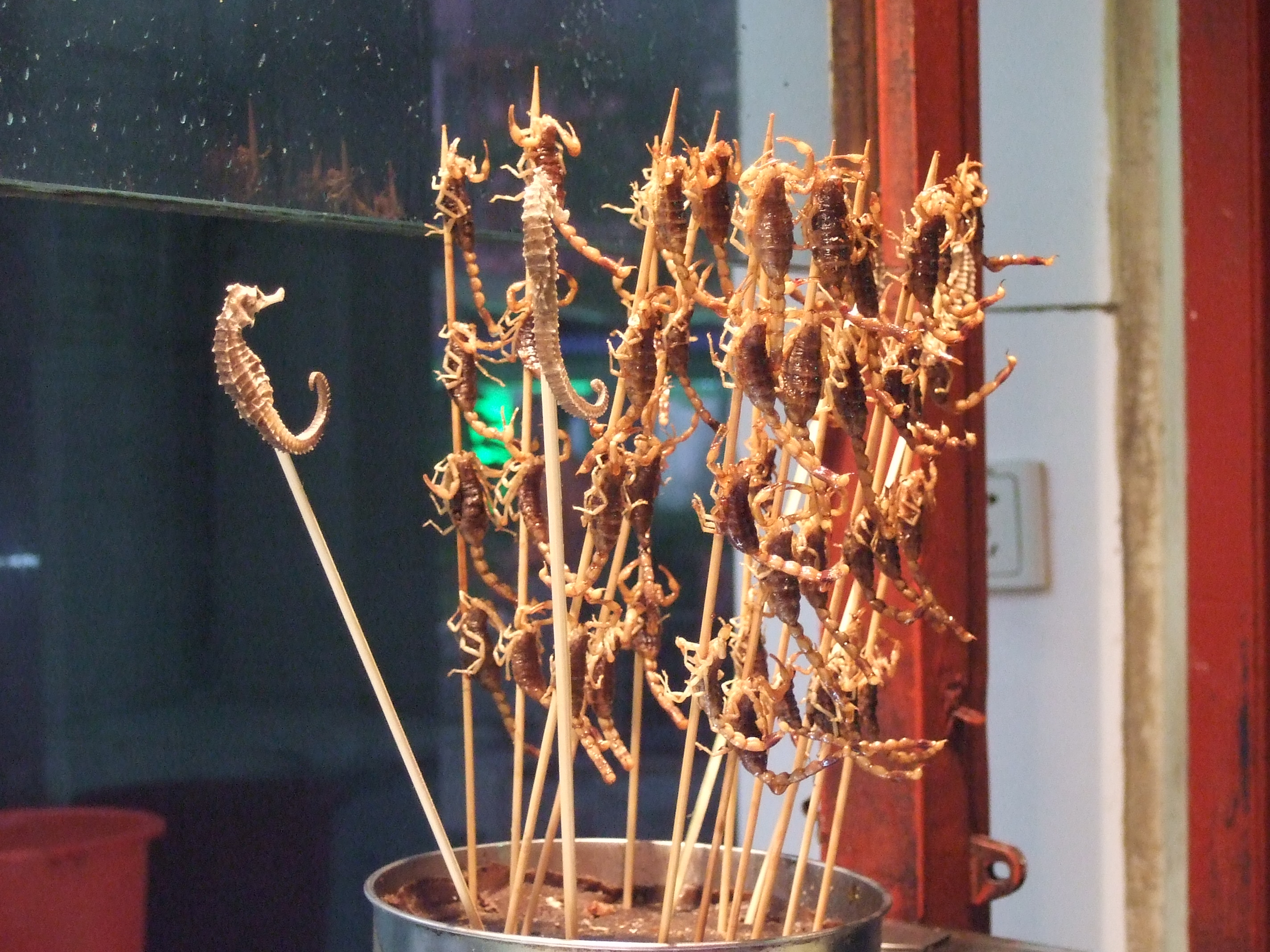
Seahorse and scorpion skewers as street food

Seahorse populations are thought to be endangered as a result of overfishing and habitat destruction. Despite a lack of scientific studies or clinical trials, the consumption of seahorses is widespread in traditional Chinese medicine, primarily in connection with impotence, wheezing, nocturnal enuresis, and pain, as well as labor induction. Up to 20 million seahorses may be caught each year to be sold for such uses. Preferred species of seahorses include H. kellogii, H. histrix, H. kuda, H. trimaculatus, and H. mohnikei. Seahorses are also consumed by Indonesians, central Filipinos, and many other ethnic groups. Import and export of seahorses has been controlled under CITES since 2002.

The problem may be exacerbated by the growth of pills and capsules as the preferred method of ingesting seahorses. Pills are cheaper and more available than traditional, individually tailored prescriptions of whole seahorses, but the contents are harder to track. Seahorses once had to be of a certain size and quality before they were accepted by TCM practitioners and consumers. Declining availability of the preferred large, pale, and smooth seahorses has been offset by the shift towards prepackaged preparations, which makes it possible for TCM merchants to sell previously unused, or otherwise undesirable juvenile, spiny, and dark-coloured animals. Dried seahorse retails from US$600 to $3000 per kilogram, with larger, paler, and smoother animals commanding the highest prices. In terms of value based on weight, seahorses retail for more than the price of silver and almost that of gold in Asia.

== Species ==
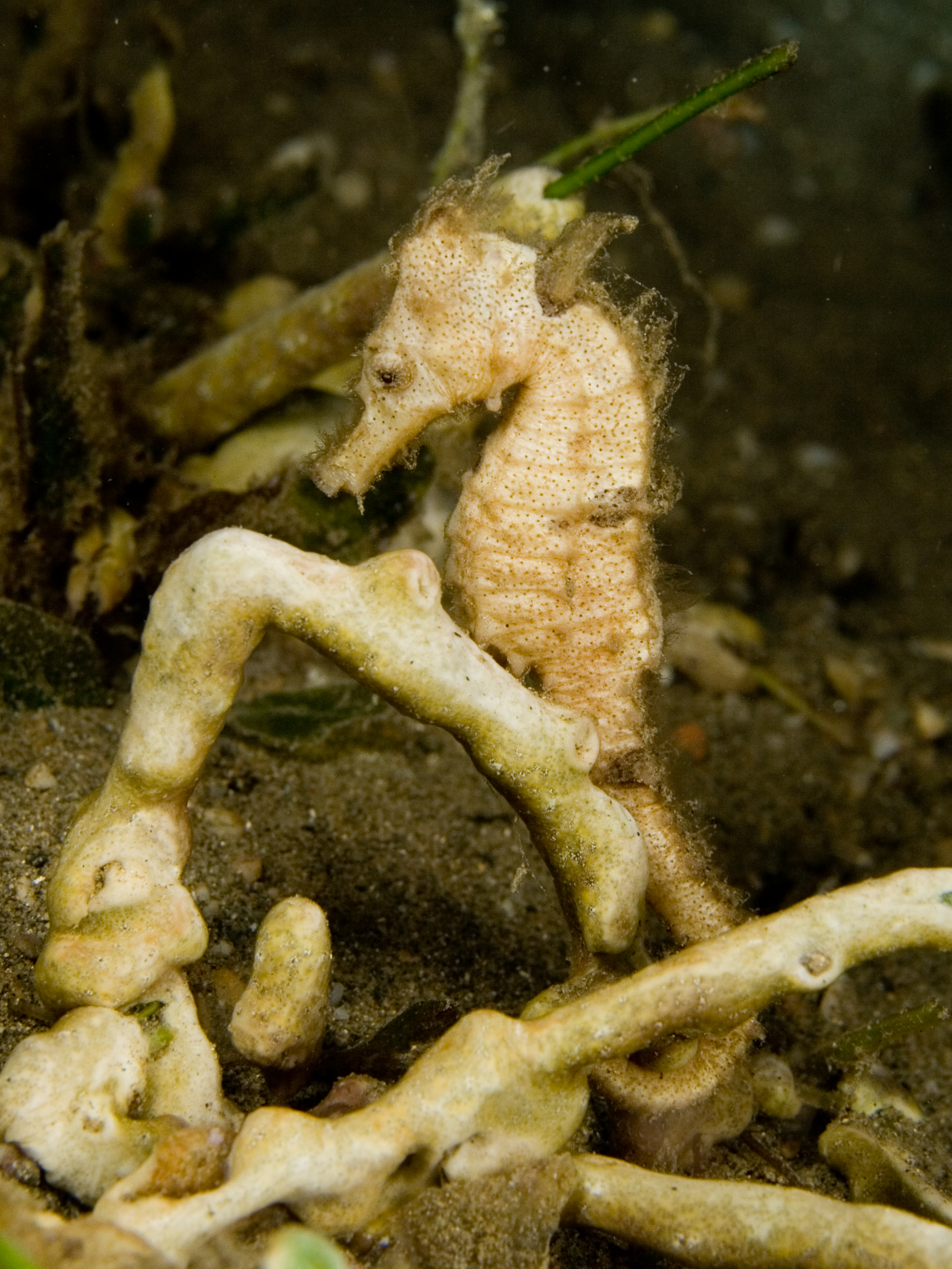
H. kuda, known as the "common seahorse"

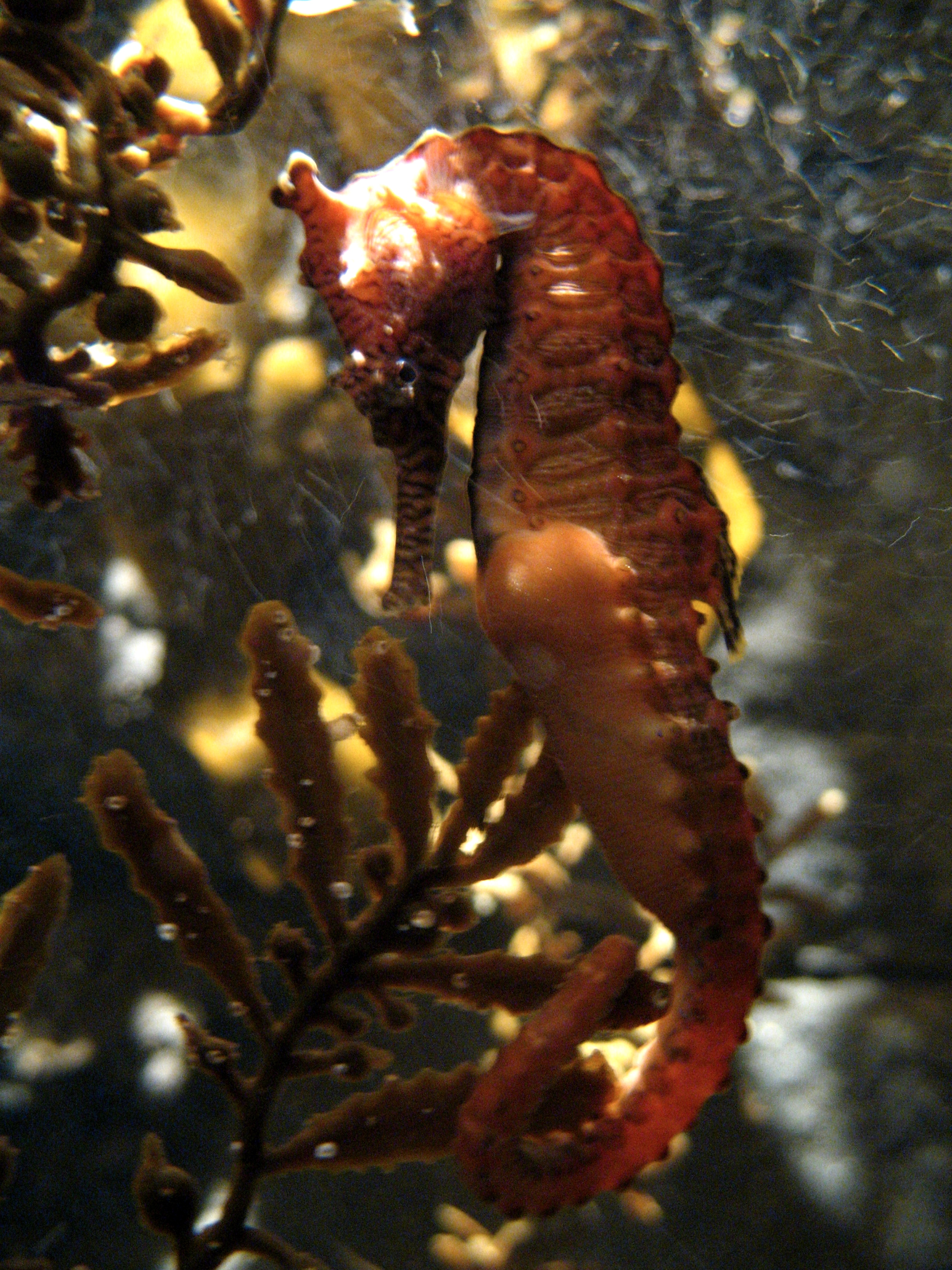
H. subelongatus, known as the "West Australian seahorse"

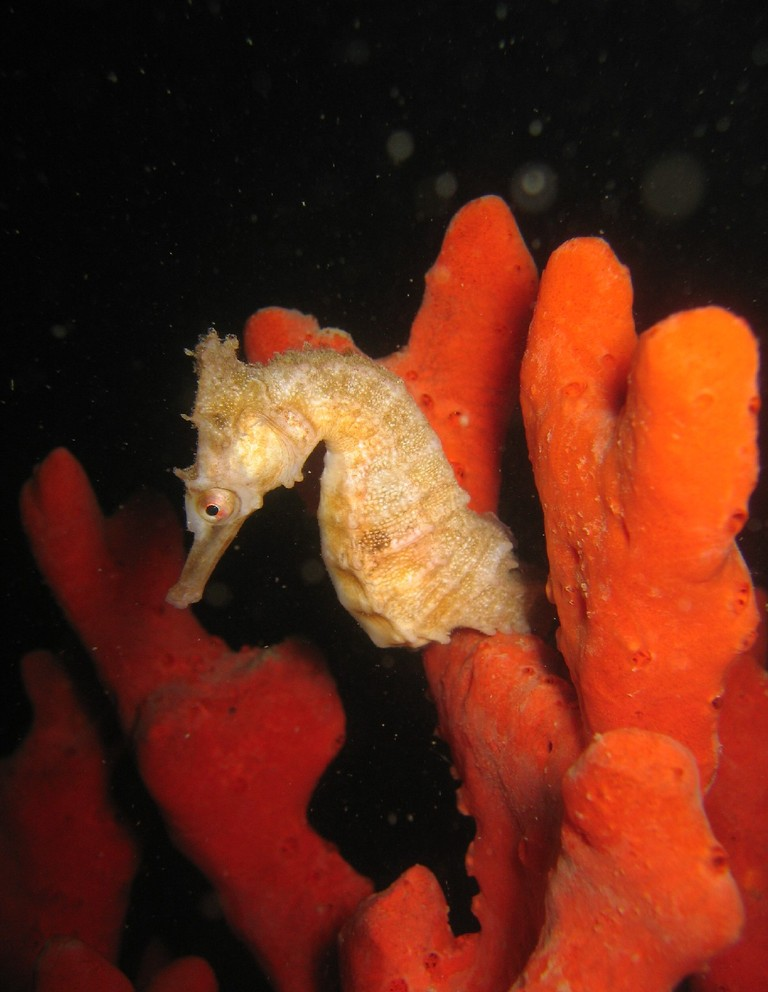
H. whitei, known as "White's seahorse"

On the basis of the newest overall taxonomic review of the genus Hippocampus with further new species and partial taxonomic review, the number of recognized species in this genus is considered to be 47 (retrieved Aug 2026):

- Hippocampus abdominalis Lesson, 1827 (big-belly seahorse)
- Hippocampus algiricus Kaup, 1856 (West African seahorse)
- Hippocampus amandavincentae Shalu, Short, Raghavan, Ramvilas & Ranjeet, 2026 (Indian ocean spiny seahorse)
- Hippocampus angustus Günther, 1870 (narrow-bellied seahorse)
- Hippocampus barbouri Jordan & Richardson, 1908 (Barbour's seahorse)
- Hippocampus bargibanti Whitley, 1970 (pygmy seahorse)
- Hippocampus breviceps Peters, 1869 (short-headed seahorse)
- Hippocampus camelopardalis Bianconi, 1854 (giraffe seahorse)
- Hippocampus capensis Boulenger, 1900 (Knysna seahorse)
- Hippocampus casscsio Zhang, Qin, Wang & Lin, 2016 (Beibu Bay seahorse)
- Hippocampus colemani Kuiter, 2003 (Coleman's pygmy seahorse)
- Hippocampus comes Cantor, 1850 (tiger-tail seahorse)
- Hippocampus coronatus Temminck & Schlegel, 1850 (crowned seahorse)
- Hippocampus curvicuspis Fricke, 2004 (New Caledonian seahorse)
- Hippocampus dahli J. D. Ogilby, 1908 (lowcrown seahorse)
- Hippocampus debelius Gomon & Kuiter, 2009 (softcoral seahorse)
- Hippocampus denise Lourie & Randall, 2003 (Denise's pygmy seahorse)
- Hippocampus erectus Perry, 1810 (lined seahorse)
- Hippocampus fisheri Jordan & Evermann, 1903 (Fisher's seahorse)
- Hippocampus guttulatus Cuvier, 1829 (long-snouted seahorse)
- Hippocampus haema Han, Kim, Kai & Senou, 2017 (Korean seahorse)
- Hippocampus hippocampus Linnaeus, 1758 (short-snouted seahorse)
- Hippocampus histrix Kaup, 1856 (spiny seahorse)
- Hippocampus ingens Girard, 1858 (Pacific seahorse)
- Hippocampus japapigu Short, R. Smith, Motomura, Harasti & H. Hamilton, 2018 (Japanese pygmy seahorse)
- Hippocampus jayakari Boulenger, 1900 (Jayakar's seahorse)
- Hippocampus jugumus Kuiter, 2001 (collared seahorse)
- Hippocampus kelloggi Jordan & Snyder, 1901 (great seahorse)
- Hippocampus kuda Bleeker, 1852 (spotted seahorse)
- Hippocampus mohnikei Bleeker, 1854 (Japanese seahorse)
- Hippocampus nalu Short, Claassens, R. Smith, De Brauwer, H. Hamilton, Stat & Harasti, 2020 (South African pygmy seahorse or Sodwana pygmy seahorse)
- Hippocampus patagonicus Piacentino & Luzzatto, 2004 (Patagonian seahorse)
- Hippocampus planifrons Peters, 1877 (flatface seahorse, false-eye seahorse)
- Hippocampus pontohi Lourie & Kuiter, 2008 (Pontoh's pygmy seahorse)
- Hippocampus pusillus Fricke, 2004 (pygmy thorny seahorse)
- Hippocampus reidi Ginsburg, 1933 (longsnout seahorse)
- Hippocampus satomiae Lourie & Kuiter, 2008 (Satomi's pygmy seahorse)
- Hippocampus sindonis Jordan & Snyder, 1901 (Sindo's seahorse)
- Hippocampus spinosissimus Weber, 1913 (hedgehog seahorse)
- Hippocampus subelongatus Castelnau, 1873 (West Australian seahorse)
- Hippocampus trimaculatus Leach, 1814 (longnose seahorse)
- Hippocampus tristis Castelnau, 1872 (Lazarus Seahorse)
- Hippocampus tyro Randall & Lourie, 2009 (Tyro seahorse)
- Hippocampus waleananus Gomon & Kuiter, 2009 (Walea soft coral pygmy seahorse)
- Hippocampus whitei Bleeker, 1855 (White's seahorse)
- Hippocampus zebra Whitley, 1964 (zebra seahorse)
- Hippocampus zosterae Jordan & Gilbert, 1882 (dwarf seahorse)

=== Pygmy seahorses ===
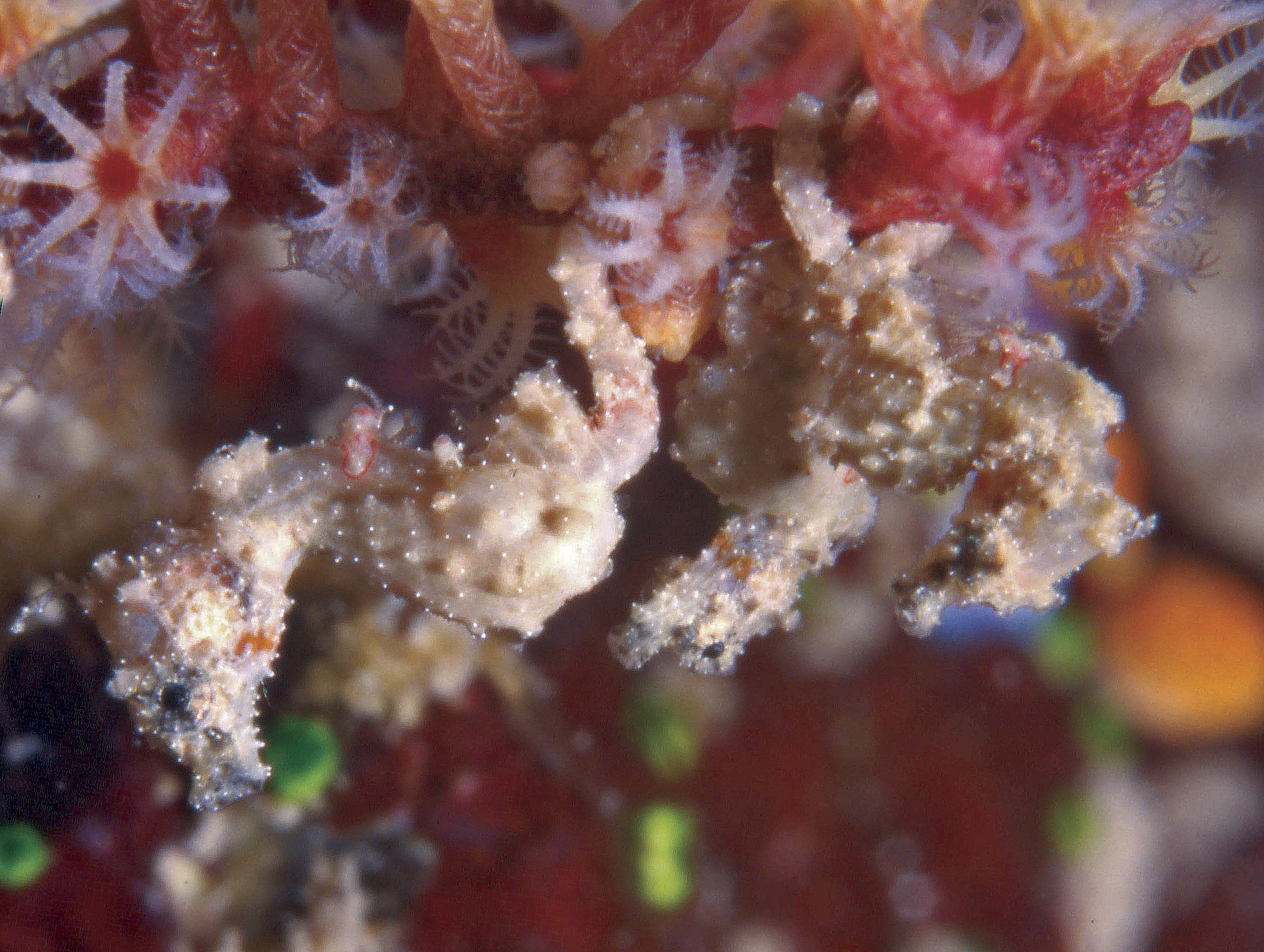
Hippocampus satomiae (Satomi's pygmy seahorse) attached to coral

Pygmy seahorses are those members of the genus that are less than 15 mm (9/16 in) tall and 17 mm (11/16 in) wide. Previously the term was applied exclusively to the species H. bargibanti but since 1997, discoveries have made this usage obsolete. The species H. minotaur, H. denise, H. colemani, H. pontohi, H. severnsi, H. satomiae, H. waleananus, H. nalu, H. japapigu have been described. Other species that are believed to be unclassified have also been reported in books, dive magazines and on the Internet. They can be distinguished from other species of seahorse by their 12 trunk rings, low number of tail rings (26–29), the location in which young are brooded in the trunk region of males and their extremely small size. Molecular analysis (of ribosomal RNA) of 32 Hippocampus species found that H. bargibanti belongs in a separate clade from other members of the genus and therefore that the species diverged from the other species in the ancient past.

Most pygmy seahorses are well camouflaged and live in close association with other organisms including colonial hydrozoans (Lytocarpus and Antennellopsis), coralline algae (Halimeda), and sea fans (Muricella, Annella, and Acanthogorgia). This combined with their small size accounts for why most species have only been noticed and classified since 2001.
