= Hippocampus casscsio =

Conservation status
- Data Deficient (IUCN 3.1)
- CITES Appendix II (CITES)

Scientific classification
- Domain: Eukaryota
- Kingdom: Animalia
- Phylum: Chordata
- Class: Actinopterygii
- Order: Syngnathiformes
- Family: Syngnathidae
- Genus: Hippocampus
- Species: H. casscsio

Binomial name
- Hippocampus casscsio Zhang, Qin, Wang & Lin, 2016

Species of fish

Hippocampus casscsio, the Beibu Bay seahorse, is a species of marine fish of the family Syngnathidae. It is found off the coast of Hainan, China, and from sites around Beibu Bay/the Gulf of Tonkin. It inhabits shallow coastal waters to depths of 15 metres (49 ft). It is expected to consume small benthic and planktonic crustaceans such as copepods, shrimps, and mysids, similar to other seahorses. This species is ovoviviparous, with males brooding eggs in a brood pouch before giving birth to live young. It grows to a length of 13.3 centimetres (5.2 in).
