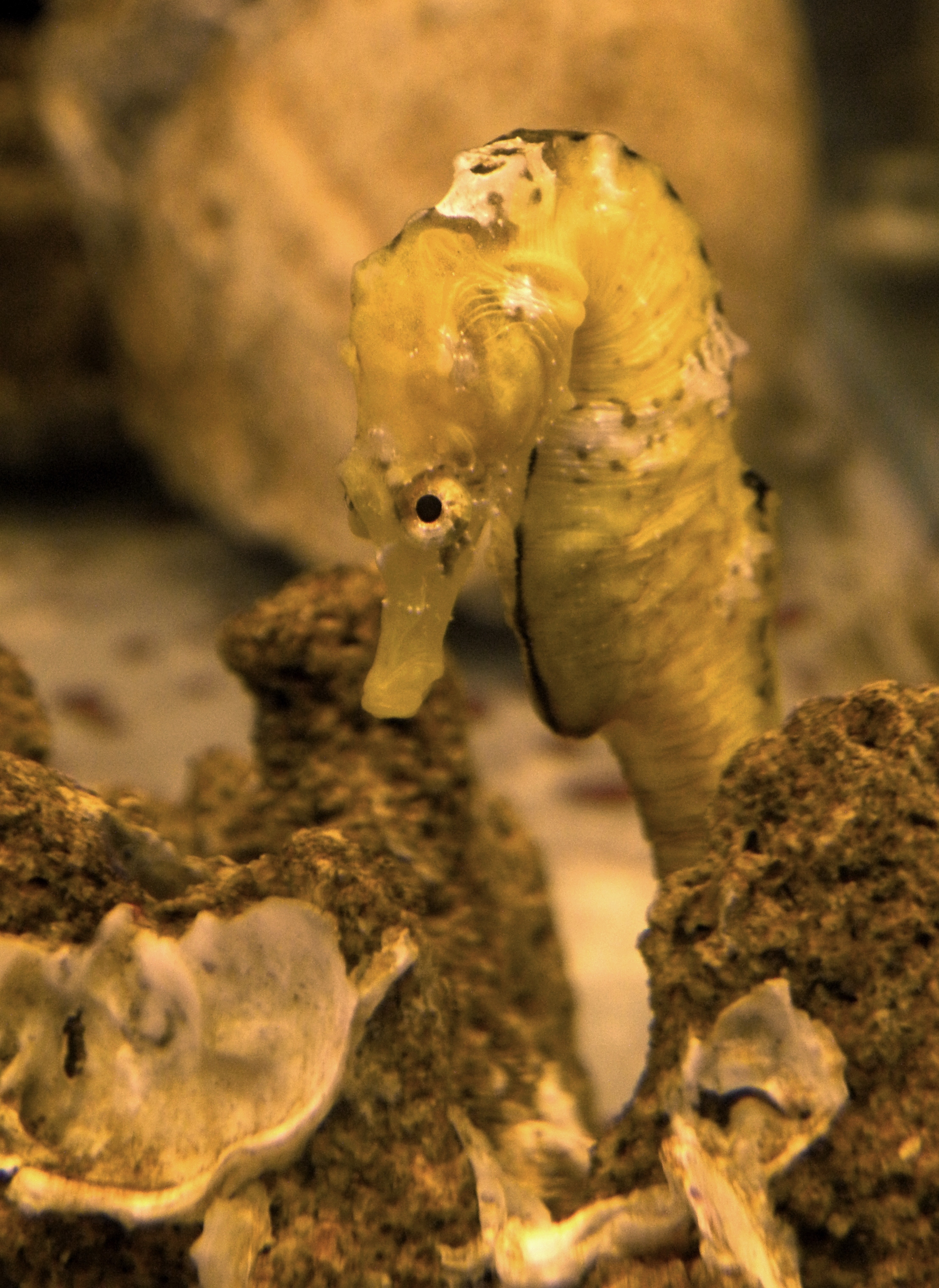

Conservation status
- Vulnerable (IUCN 3.1)
- CITES Appendix II (CITES)

Scientific classification
- Kingdom: Animalia
- Phylum: Chordata
- Class: Actinopterygii
- Order: Syngnathiformes
- Family: Syngnathidae
- Genus: Hippocampus
- Species: H. patagonicus

Binomial name
- Hippocampus patagonicus Piacentino & Luzzatto, 2004

= Hippocampus patagonicus =

Patagonian seahorse

Species of fish

The Patagonian seahorse (Hippocampus patagonicus) is a species of marine fish of the family Syngnathidae. It inhabits coastal waters from northeastern Brazil to Chubut, Argentina. It generally is found at shallow depths attached to natural or artificial substrates. This species is ovoviviparous, with males brooding eggs in a brood pouch before giving birth to live young.

== Identification ==
H. patagonicus is typically 6–15 centimetres (2.4–5.9 in) long with low spines, a short snout, and a long tail. Its coronet is a low ridge or wedge. Individuals are drably coloured, ranging from pale to dark brown, yellow, red or orange. The body and head have irregular dark striations and small white dots.

== Habitat ==
H. patagonicus typically occurs in shallow waters to depths of 15 metres (49 ft) in Argentina. Individuals in Brazil have been found in deeper waters to depths of 120 metres (390 ft). They are usually found attached to floating marine algae (Sargassum sp.), seagrasses, sessile invertebrates (such as sponges, ascidians and polychaete worms), or artificial substrates.

== Ecology ==
=== Feeding ===
Individuals of this carnivorous species are opportunistic predators, meaning that they prey on whatever species is most abundant and vulnerable in their environment at the time. They prey on amphipods, (including Gammaridae, Caprellidae, and Hiperidae species), and decapods. All sexes and sizes share feeding habits.

=== Reproduction and growth ===
H. patagonicus is an ovoviviparous species, with females using an ovipositor to transfer eggs into a male's brood pouch, where they are fertilized and protected until the male gives birth to live young. Average gestation time is 19.6 days, and average brood size in captivity is 207 individuals. Offspring size is 0.7 centimetres (0.28 in). Both males and females appear to reach maturity during their first breeding season (spring and summer), at sizes around 11 centimetres (4.3 in). Life expectancy for H. patagonicus is two to three years.

In San Antonio Bay, juveniles have been reported to demonstrate dispersive potential by rafting, which may explain records of the species in deeper waters. Rafting occurs when juveniles attach to floating substrates, which are then dispersed by currents. This increases the juveniles' dispersal range, but it may also be cause for conservation concern, as rafting juveniles are susceptible to being trapped in seine nets.

== Population ==
There have been no dedicated population surveys or estimates for this species, but inferences based on declining habitat quality, extent of occurrence, and fisher interviews propose a population decline of at least 30% over 10 years.

== Threats ==
The major threats to H. patagonicus are fishing pressure and habitat degradation. In both Brazil and Argentina, seahorses are collected and traded as curios, traditional medicines, religious amulets and as aquarium fishes. H. patagonicus is the most commonly caught seahorse species in the south and southeast regions of Brazil, usually as by-catch of shrimp fisheries. Habitat degradation by coastal urban development, shrimp fisheries, and vessel traffic also poses a threat to this species.

== Conservation ==
All Hippocampus species are listed under Appendix II of the Convention on International Trade in Endangered Species (CITES), which regulates the legal import and export of seahorses. In 2004, the Brazilian Institute of Environment and Renewable Natural Resources implemented an unenforced and unmonitored seahorse export quota of 250 specimens per species. Quotas were clearly violated by exporters, however, who misidentified or mislabeled seahorse species in order to increase exports.

H. patagonicus has been declared a "Natural Monument" in Mar del Plata, Argentina. This is the highest conservation status available in Argentina, prohibiting any abuse, harm, capture or captivity of the species. Exceptions are made in the case of individuals collected for scientific purposes. H. patagonicus is considered a flagship species in Mar del Plata and is used to educate the community about the importance of coastal ecosystems.
