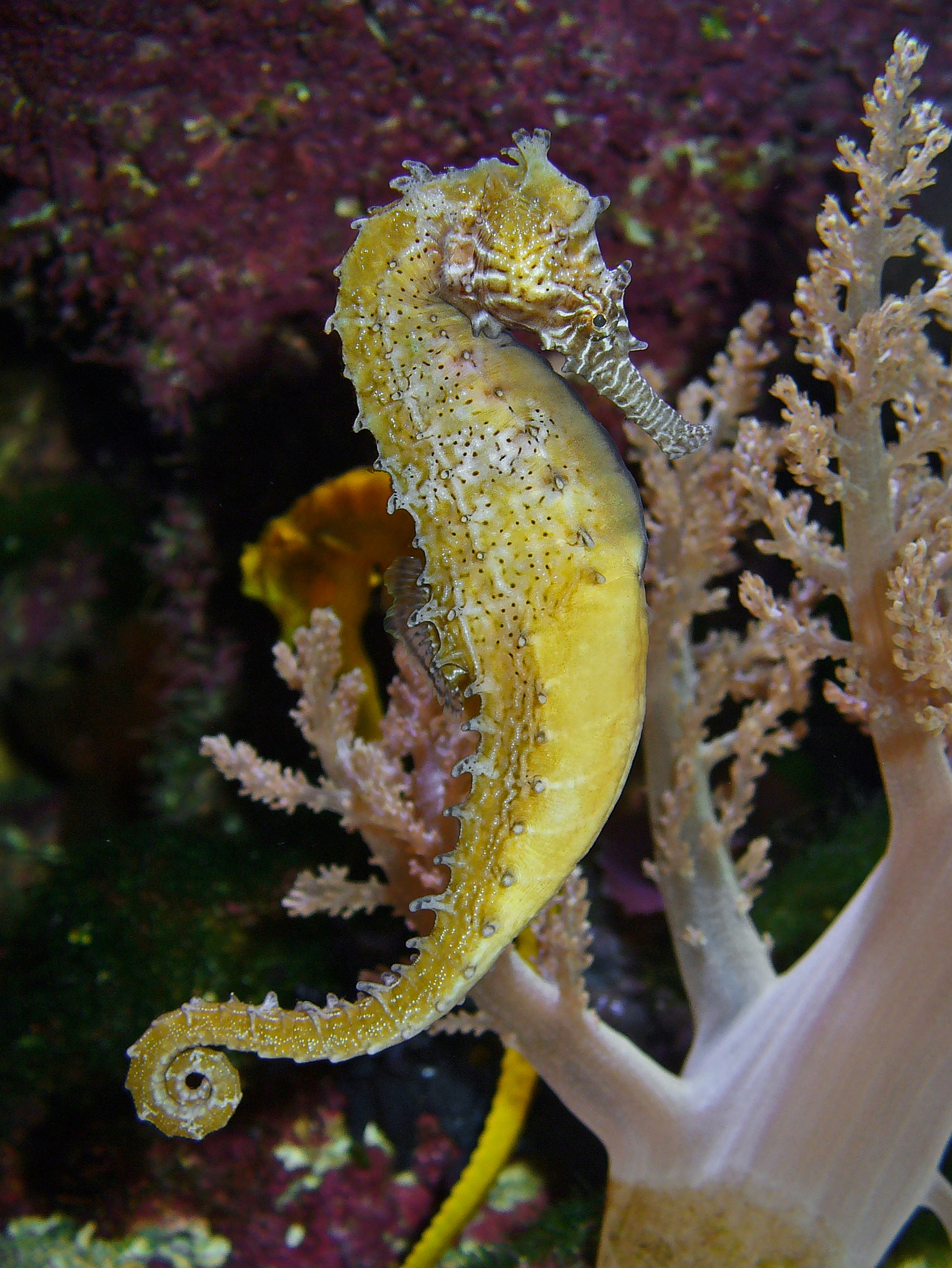

Conservation status
- Vulnerable (IUCN 3.1)
- CITES Appendix II (CITES)

Scientific classification
- Kingdom: Animalia
- Phylum: Chordata
- Class: Actinopterygii
- Order: Syngnathiformes
- Family: Syngnathidae
- Genus: Hippocampus
- Species: H. barbouri

Binomial name
- Hippocampus barbouri D. S. Jordan & R. E. Richardson, 1908

Synonyms
- Hippocampus aimei Roule, 1916

= Barbour's seahorse =

Species of fish

Barbour's seahorse (Hippocampus barbouri) is a species of fish of the family Syngnathidae.

== Habitat ==
Hippocampus barbouri is found in seagrasses and shallow waters off the coasts of the Philippines, Malaysia, and Indonesia. Individuals have been recorded at a maximum depth of 10 metres (33 ft). The Barbour's Seahorse is native to Indonesia (Bali, Jawa, Kalimantan, Sulawesi), Malaysia (Sabah), and the Philippines. Habitats include seagrass beds, mangrove swamps, estuaries, and muddy areas.

== Population ==
Records show a 30% decline in the H. barbouri population over the past 10 years, which has continued to increase due to over fishing and the destruction of seagrass habitats. Exact numbers are unknown but percentage estimates can be made using fishing records. H. barbouri is classified as Vulnerable by the 2017 IUCN red list assessments. They were first put on the Red list in 1996. Respondents at various levels of trade (including fishers, buyers, wholesalers, retailers, exporters and officials) in 1998 and 1999 in Malaysia reported declines in seahorse numbers and availability and that H. barbouri was one of the most common species traded.

== Feeding and identification ==
The Barbour's seahorse feeds on small shrimp, crustaceans, calanoid copepods and decapod larvae, but has also been known to ingest the larvae of polychaetes and fish.

Individuals have well-developed spines such as their sharp eye, nose, and double cheek spine. The longest and broadest of the spines is its first dorsal spine. Its tail is relatively short in proportion to its body and has a series of long and short spines along it. They range in color from white to yellow to greenish gray to light brown, and some may have some reddish-brown spots or lines. The males usually grow to an average length of 11–15 centimetres (4.3–5.9 in) where females average at 11–13 centimetres (4.3–5.1 in). It is often confused with the hedgehog seahorse, Hippocampus histrix.

== Reproduction ==
This species is ovoviviparous, with males carrying eggs before giving birth to live young. The female deposits her eggs into the male's brood pouch. Through the pregnancy the pair strengthens their pair bonds with daily greetings. The gestation period for H. barbouri is 12–14 days, with a typical brood size of about 10–240 offspring. They give no parental care to juveniles after birth. Pairs mate monogamously, and may mate many times in a single season.

== Predation ==
Hippocampus barbouri are most vulnerable during the juvenile stage. They use crypsis as a mechanism for survival. The spiny texture of its skin and coloration allow it to camouflage itself among the corals they associate with.

== Aquaculture ==
These seahorses are widely traded for traditional medicines and aquarium trading. This, along with the fact that their habitat it being destroyed, has caused their population size to continuously decrease.

== Naming ==
The specific name honours the American zoologist and herpetologist Thomas Barbour 1884–1946.
