= Hippocampus planifrons =

False-eye seahorse

Conservation status
- Least Concern (IUCN 3.1)
- CITES Appendix II

Scientific classification
- Kingdom: Animalia
- Phylum: Chordata
- Class: Actinopterygii
- Order: Syngnathiformes
- Family: Syngnathidae
- Genus: Hippocampus
- Species: H. planifrons

Binomial name
- Hippocampus planifrons Peters, 1877

Synonyms
- Hippocampus biocellatus Kuiter, 2001

Species of fish

The false-eye seahorse, or flatface seahorse (Hippocampus planifrons) is a species of marine fish of the family Syngnathidae. It is endemic to Australia, from Shark Bay to Broome, where it is found in intertidal rockpools, shallow algae and weedy or rubble reef habitats. It is expected to feed on harpacticoid, calanoid, and cyclopoid copepods, caridean and gammaridean shrimps, and mysids, similar to other seahorses. This species is ovoviviparous, with males brooding eggs in a brood pouch before giving birth to live young.

== Identifying features ==
H. planifrons is usually around 7 centimetres (2.8 in) long, but can grow to 12 centimetres (4.7 in). It is characterized by a relatively small head, short and upturned snout, slender trunk, slightly raised coronet, and spines. Female colouration in life is overall greenish brown with dark blotching over the back of the trunk and tail.
