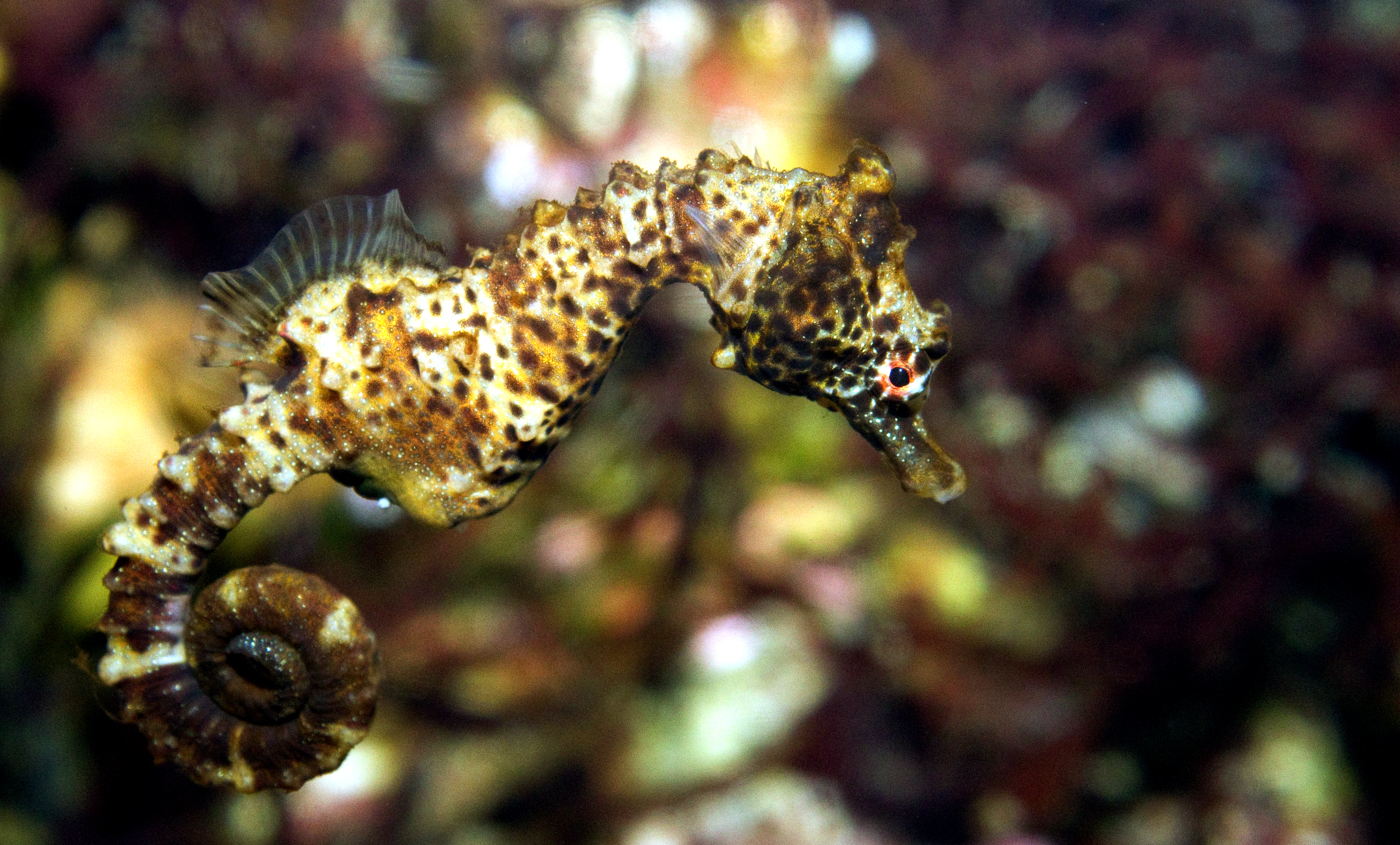

Conservation status
- Least Concern (IUCN 3.1)
- CITES Appendix II (CITES)

Scientific classification
- Kingdom: Animalia
- Phylum: Chordata
- Class: Actinopterygii
- Order: Syngnathiformes
- Family: Syngnathidae
- Genus: Hippocampus
- Species: H. breviceps

Binomial name
- Hippocampus breviceps W. K. H. Peters, 1869

Synonyms
- Hippocampus tuberculatus Castelnau, 1875

= Knobby seahorse =

Species of fish

The knobby seahorse (Hippocampus breviceps), also known as the short-headed seahorse or short-snouted seahorse, is a species of marine fish of the family Syngnathidae. It inhabits coastal waters in southwestern and southeastern Australia, from Gregory to Bremer Bay (Western Australia), and from Denial Bay (South Australia) to Newcastle (New South Wales).

== Identification ==
H. breviceps is usually around 10 centimetres (3.9 in) long, with a small, slender body, short snout and raised coronet. Individuals often have fleshy tendrils on the head and back. Colouration is generally drab grey to bright yellow-orange, with small black spots and ringed white ocelli over the trunk and tail. The ventral side of the tail has pale bars.

== Habitat ==
H. breviceps lives in sheltered coastal reefs associated with macroalgal beds and seagrasses. Individuals have also been found on floating macroalgae, rock reefs, jetty habitats, and sponge reefs below depths of 15 metres (49 ft). More commonly, this species occurs at depths near 5 m.

== Ecology ==
=== Feeding ===
This carnivorous species feeds on mysids, harpacticoid copepods, and gammarid and caprellid amphipods. It feeds during the day, staying close to the sand or rubble bottom.

=== Reproduction ===
H. breviceps breeds on an approximately monthly cycle in the summer, producing 50-100 young per brood. Females deposit eggs into the male's brood pouch, where they are fertilized and protected before the male gives birth to live young.

== Threats ==
This species may be threatened locally by coastal development, but this is not prevalent across its range.
