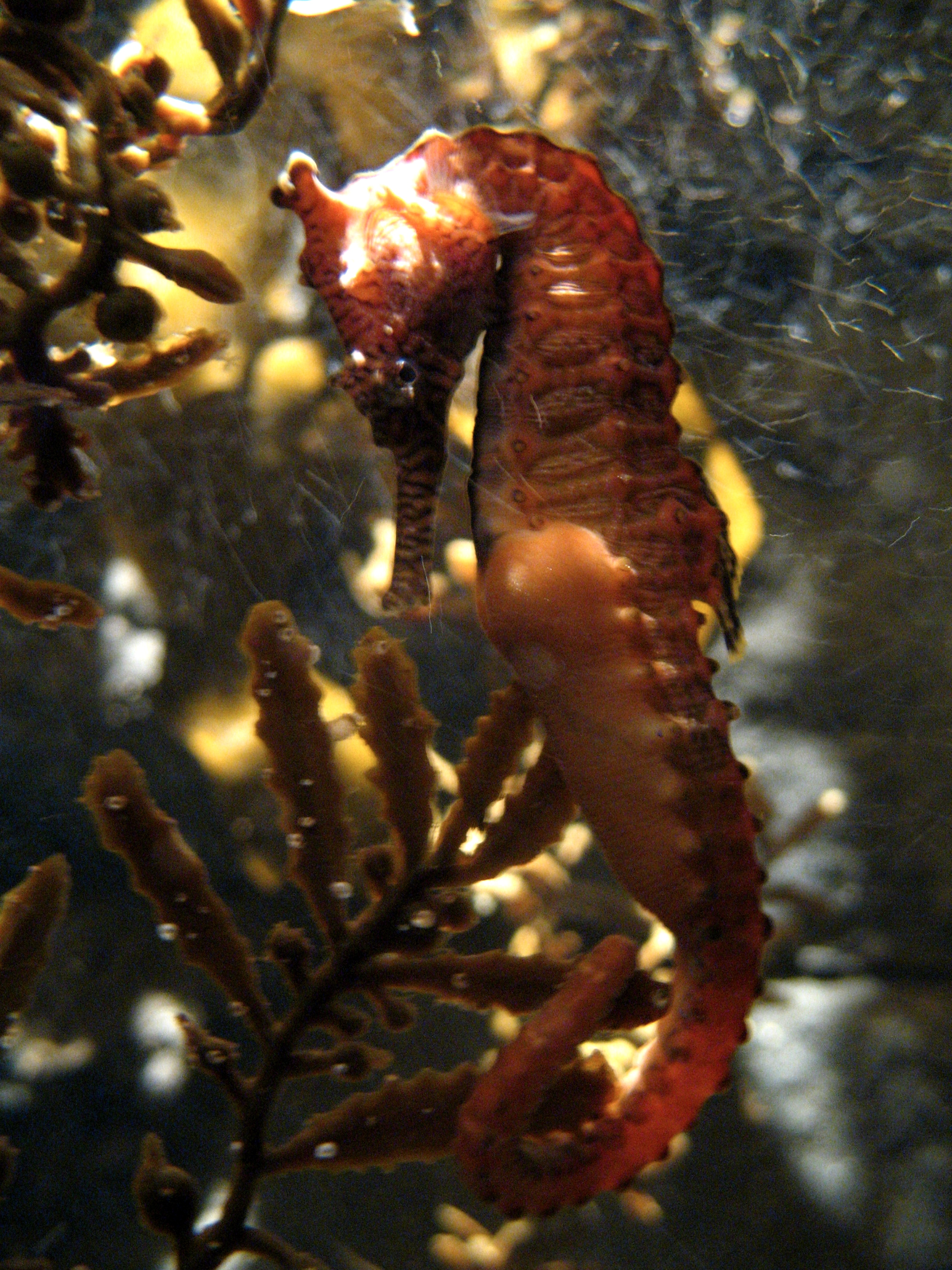

Conservation status
- Data Deficient (IUCN 3.1)
- CITES Appendix II

Scientific classification
- Kingdom: Animalia
- Phylum: Chordata
- Class: Actinopterygii
- Division: Teleostei
- Order: Syngnathiformes
- Family: Syngnathidae
- Genus: Hippocampus
- Species: H. subelongatus

Binomial name
- Hippocampus subelongatus Castelnau, 1873

Synonyms
- Hippocampus angustus Günther, 1870

= Tiger snout seahorse =

West Australian seahorse

Species of fish

The tiger snout seahorse (Hippocampus subelongatus) or West Australian seahorse, is a species of fish in the family Syngnathidae. It is endemic to south-western Australia, where it occurs from the Abrolhos Islands to Rockingham. Its natural habitats are the edges of rocky areas, muddy bottoms and areas with murky water caused by high sediment load, around jetty pilings and moorings; it is often associated with sponges or sea squirts and frequently attaches itself to man-made objects. In the winter they move to deeper water.

== Reproduction ==
Hippocampus subelongatus participate in strictly monogamous relationships. There are more mated females than unmated females, however, the amount of mated and unmated males is roughly the same. This is a direct result of the substantial sexual selection on females—the males have a preference when mating, they prefer larger females.
