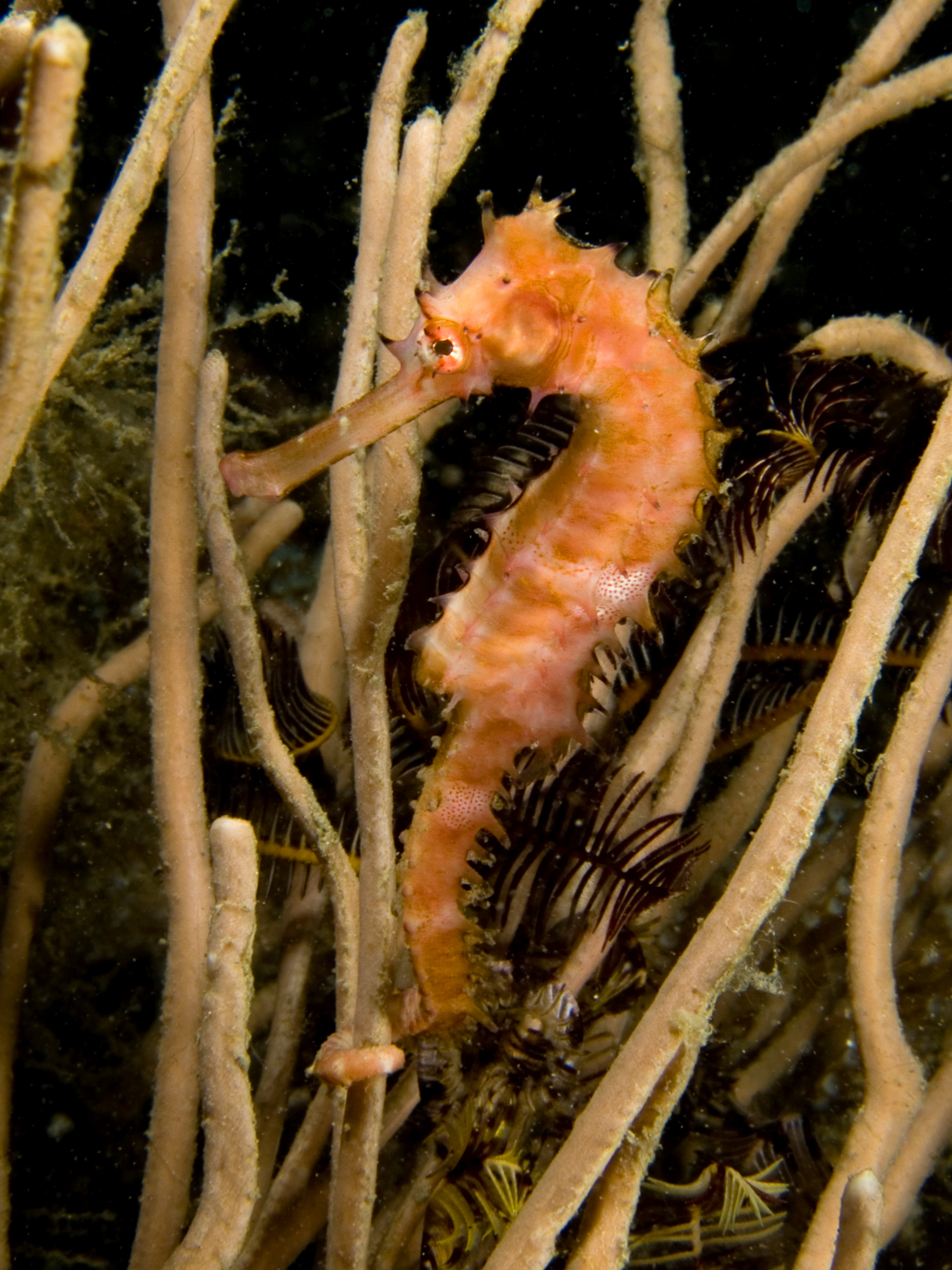

Conservation status
- Vulnerable (IUCN 3.1)
- CITES Appendix II

Scientific classification
- Kingdom: Animalia
- Phylum: Chordata
- Class: Actinopterygii
- Order: Syngnathiformes
- Family: Syngnathidae
- Genus: Hippocampus
- Species: H. histrix

Binomial name
- Hippocampus histrix Kaup, 1856

Synonyms
- Hippocampus curvicuspis Fricke, 2004

= Spiny seahorse =

Species of fish

The spiny seahorse (Hippocampus histrix), also referred to as the thorny seahorse, is a small marine fish in the family Syngnathidae, native to the Indo-Pacific area. It is classified as a Vulnerable species by the IUCN.

== Description ==
The spiny seahorse is a small fish that can reach a maximum length of 15–17 cm.

The body is slender, elongated and completely covered with thorns. These are sharp with dark tips, and uniformly sized on the prehensile tail. The trunk has long thorns which continue until the coronet, which has 4–5. The head is also provided with numerous spines especially on the forehead, the base of the cheeks, the nose and above the eyes. The snout is very long and tapered. Body coloration is highly variable to match surroundings and goes from grey to cream, and from bright yellow, to green or red and even brownish. It can be plain or with different pattern on the side or/and on the backside. The snout is generally striped with one or more thin white lines.

== Distribution and habitat ==
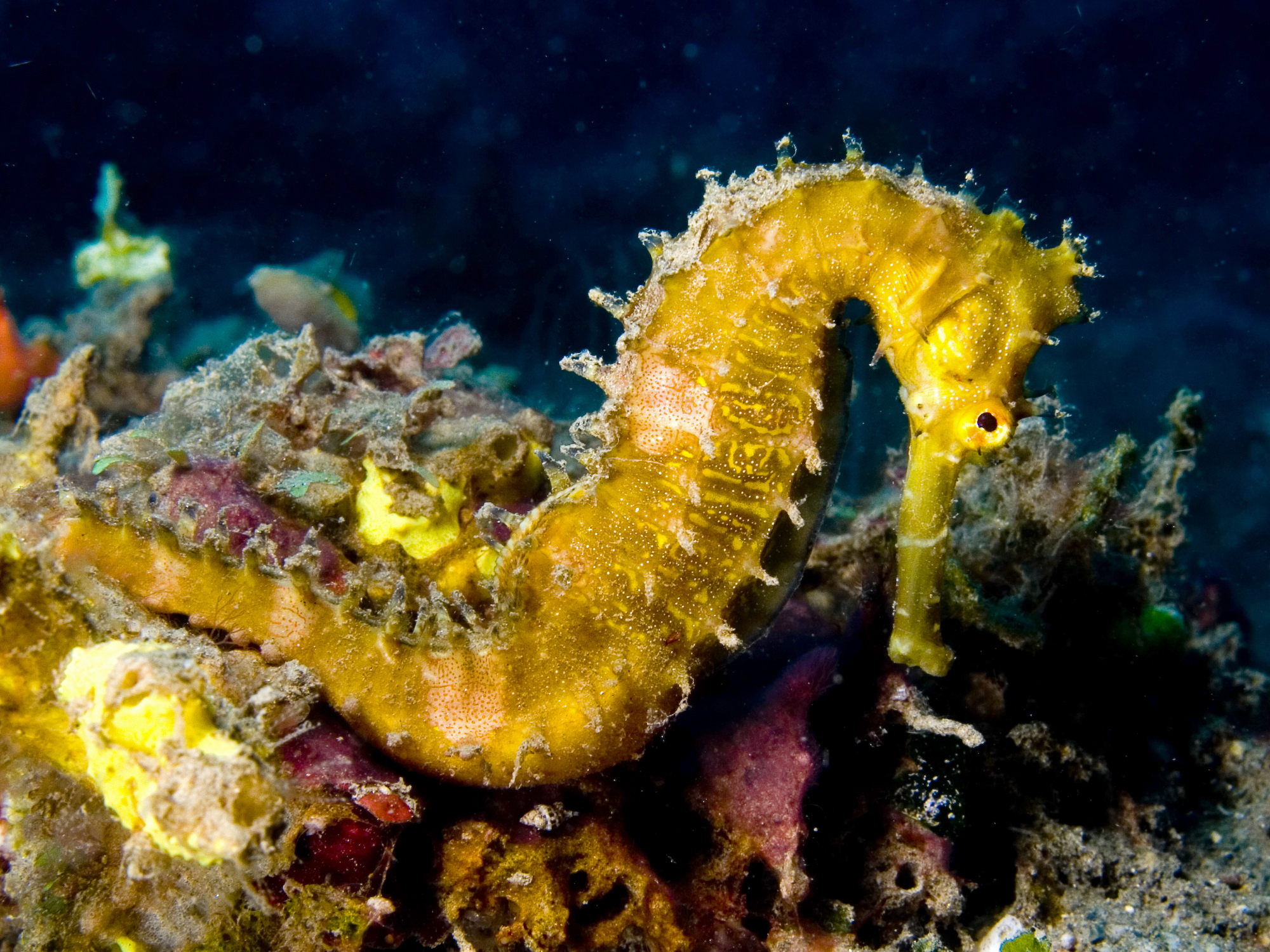
Spiny seahorse from East Timor

The spiny seahorse is relatively rare but widespread throughout the Indo-Pacific. In Australia it has been reported from the south of Ashmore Reef, Timor Sea, the Great Barrier Reef, Queensland, and in Port Stephens, New South Wales. It is also found at Bali, Indonesia, Papua New Guinea, New Caledonia and Japan. The species favours relatively deep waters (10–95 m) and is usually found below 15 m depths. This species is found on a variety of substrates including sponges, weedy rocky reefs, soft corals but mainly on seagrass beds. ^{(}^{,}^{)}

== Biology ==
The spiny seahorse has a carnivorous diet and feeds on small crustaceans and other planktonic organisms.

It is ovoviviparous and the female uses an ovipositor to transfer her eggs into an enclosed pouch under the abdomen of the male. It is the male who broods the eggs in its ventral brood pouch. The latter includes villi rich in capillaries that surround each fertilized egg creating a sort of placenta supplying the embryos. The male fertilizes the eggs inside the pouch and provides physical protection for them as they develop. He also osmoregulates, aerates the embryos, and may provide some nourishment until the offspring are born. When fully grown, pups will be expelled from the pocket and evolve in complete autonomy.

== Conservation ==
H. histrix is listed as vulnerable by the IUCN. Populations are thought to have declined by more than 30% over the last 10-15 years. It is subject both to targeted exploitation for use in traditional medicine and the aquarium trade, and to population losses from bycatch in the shrimp fishery. Inshore sea-grass habitats frequented by the species are also in decline. Like all seahorses, it is listed in Appendix II of the Convention on International Trade in Endangered Species of Wild Fauna and Flora (CITES), meaning that it is on the list of species the trade of which must be controlled to ensure their survival. As most seahorses enter trade as bycatch, imposing export quotas would achieve next to nothing for wild populations.

Decreases in population sizes are likely due to exploitation for international trade, and to bycatch and habitat destruction. Major threats to seagrass habitats include eutrophication, sedimentation, coastal construction, dredging and invasive species and these threats result in decline in and fragmentation of seagrass habitats. It is reasonable to expect that all of these threats will continue into the future. Even excluding the trade demand for this species, it is known to often be bycatch in non-selective fisheries, for example, fish and shrimp trawls which occurs throughout the range of the species and leads to the degradation of the habitat for those seahorses. Shrimp trawls are a major concern to the Hippocampus histrix species. Trade is supplied by catching the species directly but also as bycatch in other non-selective fisheries such as shrimp trawls. The trade of the thorny seahorses is reported throughout the range of the species. It had been reported in international trade since the mid 1990s and to this day fishers and traders report declines in seahorse availability.

The species is one of the six most common internationally traded species of seahorse that is reported to CITES. However, its common name is often used as a label for any spiny seahorse from the Indo-Pacific, which means it could contain specimens of other species as well. It is not often collected for the aquarium trade business because it lives in moderately deep waters, but may be used more often dried and sold for the medicine trade or as antiques/decoration. Its spines make it undesirable for the medicine trade.
