= Hippocampus pusillus =

Pygmy thorny seahorse

Conservation status
- Data Deficient (IUCN 3.1)
- CITES Appendix II (CITES)

Scientific classification
- Domain: Eukaryota
- Kingdom: Animalia
- Phylum: Chordata
- Class: Actinopterygii
- Order: Syngnathiformes
- Family: Syngnathidae
- Genus: Hippocampus
- Species: H. pusillus

Binomial name
- Hippocampus pusillus R. Fricke, 2004

Species of fish

Hippocampus pusillus, the pygmy thorny seahorse, is only known from specimens that were dredged at depths between 35 and 228m off the coast of New Caledonia.
