= Hippocampus tyro =

Conservation status
- Data Deficient (IUCN 3.1)
- CITES Appendix II (CITES)

Scientific classification
- Domain: Eukaryota
- Kingdom: Animalia
- Phylum: Chordata
- Class: Actinopterygii
- Order: Syngnathiformes
- Family: Syngnathidae
- Genus: Hippocampus
- Species: H. tyro

Binomial name
- Hippocampus tyro J. E. Randall & Lourie, 2009

Species of fish

Hippocampus tyro is a seahorse, a fish in the family Syngnathidae. The species is only known from a single specimen caught off of the coast of the Seychelles at a depth of between 43 and 48m and another photographed near the coast of Sainte-Rose, Réunion.

The hippocampus tyro is unlike other seahorses of its class, because it has 14 trunk rings where as others have a range of 8-13.
