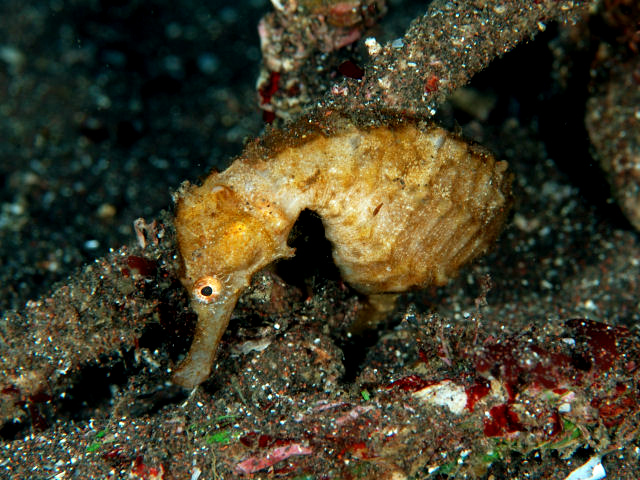

Conservation status
- Endangered (IUCN 3.1)
- CITES Appendix II

Scientific classification
- Kingdom: Animalia
- Phylum: Chordata
- Class: Actinopterygii
- Order: Syngnathiformes
- Family: Syngnathidae
- Genus: Hippocampus
- Species: H. trimaculatus

Binomial name
- Hippocampus trimaculatus Leach, 1814

Synonyms
- Hippocampus kampylotrachelos Bleeker, 1854; Hippocampus manadensis Bleeker, 1856; Hippocampus mannulus Cantor, 1850; Hippocampus lenis De Vis, 1908; Hippocampus takakurae Tanaka, 1916

= Flat-faced seahorse =

Species of fish

The flat-faced seahorse, longnose seahorse, low-crowned seahorse or three-spot seahorse (Hippocampus trimaculatus) is a species of fish in the family Syngnathidae. It is found in Australia, Cocos (Keeling) Islands, French Polynesia, China (Hong Kong), India, Indonesia, Japan, the Philippines, Singapore, Taiwan, Thailand, and Vietnam. Its natural habitat is shallow seas. It is threatened by habitat loss.

== Description ==
The longnose seahorse (Hippocampus trimaculatus), also known as the flat-faced seahorse, the low-crowned seahorse, and the three-spot seahorse, is primarily found in shallow seas around Australia and Asia. Its diet consists of plankton and small crustaceans that get sucked in through its snout. This species likes to anchor itself to sea grass while feeding in order to save energy, which is a typical seahorse behavior. Though its appearance can vary, it typically is flat, with a sharp, hook-like cheek and eye spines, with a narrow head and no nose spines. Its color can be golden orange, sandy colored, or even totally black. Some are known to have brown and white zebra-like stripes. In addition, the males are known to be slightly longer on average than females.

== Habitat and vulnerability ==
These seahorses are usually found at depths of 10–100 meters. Recently, however, juvenile flat-nosed seahorses were observed at a depth of less than 0.1 meters, and these could have been the first drifting juvenile seahorses ever recorded along Malacca Strait. This is perhaps strong evidence for passive long-distance migration in this species

These seahorses generally live in habitats such as gravel or sand bottoms around coral reefs, in muddy estuaries, and near mangroves and are also able to live in brackish waters. The flat-faced seahorse is affected by habitat loss; it is listed as a vulnerable species. Its vulnerability is due to a few factors. One large factor is that flat-faced seahorses make up some of the millions of seahorses traded internationally each year, and they are frequently bycatch. Seahorses are frequently harvested and used in traditional Chinese medicine; they are commonly dried and sold as souvenirs in the United States; and they are sold as pets throughout the world. These practices have led the Convention on International Trade in Endangered Species of Wild Fauna and Flora (abbreviated CITES) to suggest restrictions on the seahorse trade. Though these restrictions are not binding, traders must abide by them to be certified as sustainable. The most relevant restriction is that no seahorse under 10 cm can be harvested.

== Reproduction ==
The size restriction is important because of the way in which seahorses become sexually mature. In flat-faced seahorses, sexual maturity is better predicted by size than by age. For example, populations in the South China Sea and North China Sea both matured at the same size, but those found in the South China Sea were 3 months old while those found in the North China Sea were 5 months old. These seahorses reach sexual maturity before they grow to 10 cm, unlike some other species of seahorses that reach maturity when they are larger than 10 cm. When flat-faced seahorses mate, the females give their eggs to the males who carry the eggs and give birth to live young. The gestation period ranges from 11–20 days, with an average of 16 days—this variance appears to be based on water temperature. The species had gestation durations of 19 days at 22.5 °C, 16 days at 24 °C and 11 days at 28.5 °C, which is consistent with other members of the Hippocampus genus. Though flat-faced seahorses have been known to reproduce year round in captivity, they reach peak breeding from March to May in the China Sea. Their peak breeding season could vary depending on location, as they reproduce based on the constancy of water temperature.

== Genetics ==
H. trimaculatus is divided into two primary lineages, one on either side of Wallace's Line in Indonesia. In one study, all of the specimens sampled that were used either for Chinese medicine or for souvenirs were from the A lineage on the Asiatic side of Wallace's line. The sample size was small, so further studies are needed to determine if one lineage is more at risk than the other.

In a study done by Lourie (2004), it was discovered through cytochrome b sequencing that there are deep genetic breaks among individuals in Southeast Asia that were collected only 800 km away from each other. However, the same study of H. trimaculatus revealed identical genetic haplotypes from specimens collected up to 10,000 km away along the Asian continental shelf. This suggests extensive gene flow over the last 10,000 years.
