= Rudie Hermann Kuiter =

Dutch-born Australian underwater photographer, taxonomist, and marine biologist

Rudie Hermann Kuiter (born 1943) is an Australian underwater photographer, taxonomist, marine biologist and author of many identification guides to sea fishes. He described new species of seahorses in the genus Hippocampus.

== Early life ==
Kuiter was born in Amersfoort, Netherlands and emigrated to Australia in 1964.

== Career ==
Kuiter is best known for his photo-illustrated identification guides to fishes. Some are dedicated to fishes found in certain regions and others are more specialised publications which catalog various sub-groups of fishes.

=== Publications ===
- Photo Guide to Fishes of the Maldives by Rudie H. Kuiter
- Guide to Sea Fishes of Australia by Rudie H. Kuiter
- A Photographic Guide to Sea Fishes of Australia by Rudie H. Kuiter
- Fairy and Rainbow Wrasses: A Comprehensive Guide to Selected Labroids by Rudie H. Kuiter
- Fishes of South-Eastern Australia by Rudie H. Kuiter
- Seahorses, Pipefishes and Their Relatives by Rudie H. Kuiter
- Kaiserfische by Rudie H. Kuiter
- Coastal Fishes of South-Eastern Australia by Rudie H. Kuiter
- Surgeonfishes, Rabbitfishes and Their Relatives: A Comprehensive Guide to Acanthuroidei by Rudie H. Kuiter and Helmut Debelius
- Butterflyfishes, Bannerfishes and Their Relatives: A Comprehensive Guide to Chaetodontidae and Microcanthidae by Rudie H. Kuiter
- Indonesian Reef Fishes by Kuiter, R.H. & T. Tonozuka. 2001.

== Honoria ==
- Multiple fish species and one genus have been named in his honor: the damselfish Amblypomacentrus kuiteri, dragonet Dactylopus kuiteri, deepwater clingfish Kopua kuiteri, wrasse Macropharyngodon kuiteri, weedfish Heteroclinus kuiteri and the frogfish genus Kuiterichthys.

== See also ==
- Category:Taxa named by Rudie Hermann Kuiter
