= Felidae Conservation Fund =

American non-profit organization

Felidae Conservation Fund (FCF) is a California-based non-profit organization dedicated to preserving wild cats and their habitats. The organization supports and promotes international wild cat research and conservation by collaborating on field research projects, partnering with other environmental organizations, and developing community outreach and education programs.

== History ==
FCF was founded in 2006 by conservationist and entrepreneur Zara McDonald. As a competitive marathon runner, McDonald twice encountered mountain lions during solitary runs in the Marin Headlands in Northern California. These encounters led her to become involved in California mountain lion research in 2002, and she soon expanded her research work to include other wild cat species. In the fall of 2004, after returning from extended capture work with mountain lions, she began developing a conservation model that combined scientific research with education and outreach programs. This led her to found the Felidae Conservation Fund (501(c)(3)) in April 2006.

Today Felidae supports and collaborates in scientific research projects in nine countries, promotes community-level education and outreach programs, and fosters international cooperation among scientists, conservationists, governments, and environmental NGOs. Felidae is based in Sausalito, California, and raises money through donations, grants, fundraising events and online social networks.

== Mission and philosophy ==
FCF's mission is to advance the conservation of the planet's wild cat species and their habitats through partnerships in research, education and technology. Its model is to collaborate on research studies that examine human impact on wild cats and their habitats, then disseminate the results in outreach and education programs designed to convince people of the importance of preserving the natural environment. Felidae collaborates with scientists, educators, communities and lawmakers with the goal of protecting ecosystems, staving off further extinctions, and promoting healthy ways for humans to coexist with wild cats and their habitats.

Felidae's focus on wild cat conservation is motivated by the belief that the study of wild cats can serve as a leverage point for addressing the broader environmental issues of habitat loss, human-nature interactions, and wildlife sustainability. This belief is based on the idea that because cats are often the top predators in the ecosystems they inhabit, understanding and solving the problems they face can inform and guide the conservation and preservation of wild animals and wild habitats of all kinds.

== Programs ==
Felidae currently collaborates on research projects in field locations around the globe, including the United States, Malaysia, Mongolia, Chile, Peru, Iran, Namibia and Pakistan. Felidae provides strategic guidance, funding, field support, supplies and equipment to its project partners to help them achieve their research goals.

To link this scientific research to conservation efforts, Felidae incorporates the results of field studies into its outreach and education programs. These include talks and presentations throughout the US, collaborations with artists and video producers to convey the conservation message through visual media, and online projects aimed at educating young people through an interactive portal, an online and mobile phone game, and social network activities.

== Partnerships and collaboration ==
In its field work and conservation efforts FCF collaborates with the following organizations: National Park Service, California State Parks, California Department of Fish and Game, UC Santa Cruz, UC Davis, Wildlife Conservation Society, Wildlife Conservation Research Unit, Snow Leopard Trust, Snow Leopard Conservancy, International Wildlife Film Festival, Craighead Beringa South, Cheetah Conservation Fund and the International League of Conservation Photographers, among many other organizations.

== Science and research ==
Felidae's scientific research projects are based in field locations around the globe.

The Bay Area Puma Project in Northern California is the first comprehensive study of mountain lions in the San Francisco Bay Area. A primary goal of this study is to determine priority locations for wildlife overpasses and underpasses to maintain connectivity for the region's wildlife populations. In addition, the study uses GPS collars equipped with accelerometers to record detailed information on mountain lion movements that will reveal new insights into their behavior and physiology. Felidae is working with Dr. Chris Wilmers of UC Santa Cruz, along with the California Department of Fish and Game and California State Parks.

The Patagonia Puma Project in Chile is a long-term ecological study by Dr. Heiko Wittmer of UC Davis which examines the dynamics relating to the puma’s role in the decline of the huemul deer. The researchers hope to exonerate the puma from major blame in the huemul's decline.

The Bornean Wild Cat and Clouded Leopard Project in Malaysia investigates the conservation needs of five species of Bornean wild cats (Bornean clouded leopard, bay cat, flat-headed cat, marbled cat, and leopard cat). The study will use GPS collars and radio tracking to document spatial patterns, ranging behavior, activity patterns, and habitat use. Felidae is working in partnership with the Global Canopy Programme (UK), the Institute for Tropical Biology and Conservation at the University of Malaysia, and Oxford graduate students Andrew Hearn and Joanna Ross.

The Study on Endangered Snow Leopards in Mongolia is a long-term research project that will answer basic ecological and behavioral questions about the mysterious and elusive snow leopard. The study will be conducted using GPS collars, non-invasive genetics, and camera trapping with advanced mark-recapture modeling. It will attempt to answer basic questions about snow leopards (birth and mortality rates, cub survival, dispersal rates, habitat use, and home range size) that are currently unknown due to their cryptic nature and inaccessible habitat. Felidae's partners in the project are the Snow Leopard Trust and the Wildlife Conservation Society.

The Teton Cougar Project in Wyoming studies the population dynamics of mountain lions in the Greater Yellowstone ecosystem by examining predation, behavior associated with human development, and interactions with wolves, grizzly bears and black bears. The project is operated by Craighead Beringia South with support from Felidae.

The Southern California Puma Project examines the progress and implications of habitat fragmentation as puma populations in Southern California become more isolated. Felidae is collaborating with UC Davis Wildlife Health Center on this study, which has radio-collared more than 50 pumas over 7 years.

The Asiatic Cheetah Project in Iran is the first detailed ecological study of the critically endangered Asiatic cheetah. Researchers in Northern Iran work to gain insight into the cheetahs’ movements within and between reserves, information that can help scientists to protect the cats' habitat and stave off extinction.

The Snow Leopard Conservation Project in Pakistan is a high-profile study in the North Western Frontier Province of Pakistan in which the first ever GPS collar was placed on a snow leopard, as seen in the BBC documentary "Snow Leopard: Beyond the Myth". The study is a partnership between Snow Leopard Trust, WWF-Pakistan, NWFP Wildlife Department, and Felidae Conservation Fund.

The African Cheetah Project in Namibia is an ongoing study of the African cheetah that includes camera-trapping, spoor tracking, and DNA research. The study is led by the Cheetah Conservation Fund and Dr. Laurie Marker with support from Felidae.

== See also ==
- Feline Conservation Federation
- Cheetah Preservation Foundation
- Backyard Wildlife Habitat
- European Green Belt
