= Indianapolis Prize =

The Indianapolis Prize
- Awarded for: "Extraordinary contributions to conservation efforts"
- Location: Indianapolis, Indiana
- Country: United States
- Presented by: Indianapolis Zoological Society
- Rewards: US$250,000 (1st place); US$10,000 (5 runners-up)
- First award: 2006; 20 years ago
- Website: www.indianapolisprize.org

The Indianapolis Prize is a biennial prize awarded by the Indianapolis Zoo to individuals for "extraordinary contributions to conservation efforts" affecting one or more animal species.

== Overview ==
The Indianapolis Prize was established by the Indianapolis Zoo to recognize and reward individuals who have achieved significant successes in the conservation of animal species.

Every two years, nominations of deserving individuals for the Indianapolis Prize are accepted. From those nominations, a group of conservation experts from around the world select six finalists. A second group of conservation experts, aided by representatives from the Indianapolis Zoo and the city of Indianapolis, serve as jurors to review the work of the six finalists and select the winner.

From 2006 through 2012, winners received an unrestricted cash award of US$100,000, which was increased to US$250,000 for 2014 and subsequent years. In addition, beginning in 2023, the five other finalists each receive a US$50,000 unrestricted cash award.

Many renowned conservationists and scientists have served on the nominating committee and jury, including E.O. Wilson, John Terborgh, Peter Raven, and Stuart Pimm. New nominating committee and jury members are chosen each two-year prize cycle.

The Eli Lilly and Company Foundation provides funding for the prize. In addition to the US$250,000 award, the winner also receives the Lilly Medal. The obverse of the Lilly Medal features a shepherd surrounded by nature and the rising sun. On the reverse is inscribed a quote from naturalist John Muir, "When we try to pick out anything by itself, we find it hitched to everything else in the Universe."

== Indianapolis Prize Gala ==
The winner and finalists are celebrated at the Indianapolis Prize Gala held in downtown Indianapolis. It is designed to inspire guests to care more about animal conservation and place these dedicated heroes on the pedestal usually reserved for sports and entertainment stars.

== Jane Alexander Global Wildlife Ambassador Award ==
Additionally, the Indianapolis Prize created the Jane Alexander Global Wildlife Ambassador Award to recognize advocacy, outreach, and contributions of public figures who use their platform to support the natural world. The award is named in honor of actor and conservationist Jane Alexander, winners of the Ambassador award lend a credible public voice for the sustainability of wildlife.

The inaugural Jane Alexander Global Wildlife Ambassador Award was presented to its namesake in recognition of her decades-long commitment as a voice and champion for species. She has been involved with the Wildlife Conservation Society, the Audubon Society, and Panthera.

2016 Winner Sigourney Weaver has been an advocate for the mountain gorillas of Rwanda since her starring role in the 1988 film Gorillas in the Mist and serves as honorary chair of the Dian Fossey Gorilla Fund International.

In 2018, Harrison Ford received the honor for his support of Conservation International, where he is on the Executive Committee and active in the organization's design and growth. He gave voice to the Nature Is Speaking film The Ocean and helped secure the protection of more than forty million acres (16,000,000 ha) on three continents as part of the Global Conservation Fund.

In 2021, ocean conservationist and philanthropist Prince Albert II of Monaco received the honor for his dedication to protecting the world's oceans; he established the Prince Albert II of Monaco Foundation in 2006 to address the planet's alarming environmental situation. Under his leadership, Monaco is the official proponent for action by the Convention on International Trade in Endangered Species (CITES) on behalf of seahorses – a flagship species that is indicative of ocean health.

Wildlife photographer Joel Sartore received the award in 2023 for his portrait photography of at-risk species. Sartore and National Geographic founded the Photo Ark project in 2006 to inspire people to protect threatened and endangered species through documentary photography and videos.

== Emerging Conservationist Award ==
In 2022, the Indianapolis Prize Committee created a new award recognizing conservationists early in their careers and under the age of 40 years of age with the drive to make a significant impact on a species or group of species. The goal of the award is to encourage talented individuals who dedicate their lives and careers to saving species.

Similarly to the Indianapolis Prize Award, the Emerging Conservationist is chosen through a two-stage selection process. The Winner receives a US$50,000 award to further their conservation work.

In 2023, Peruvian primatologist and anthropologist, Fanny M. Cornejo was named the inaugural Winner of the Emerging Conservationist Award for her work dedicated to the conservation and research of the yellow-tailed woolly monkey. She also serves as Executive Director of Yunkawasi, an organization that works with Amazonian and Andean communities for the conservation of threatened species through sustainable economic development and a protected area management approach.

In 2025, Mwezi Badru Mugerwa, received the honor for his work to conserve the African golden cat.

== Indianapolis Prize finalists ==
Year	Finalist	Animals Studied	Organization	Sources
2006	Holly Dublin	endangered species	International Union for the Conservation of Nature (IUCN)	
2006	Iain Douglas-Hamilton	African elephants	Save the Elephants	
2006	L. David Mech	wolves	International Wolf Foundation	
2006	Roger Payne	whales	Ocean Alliance	
2006	Simon Stuart	amphibians	Amphibian Survival Alliance	
2008	Iain Douglas-Hamilton	African elephants	Save the Elephants	
2008	Rodney Jackson	snow leopards	Snow Leopard Conservancy	
2008	K. Ullas Karanth	tigers	Wildlife Conservation Society	
2008	Laurie Marker	cheetahs	Cheetah Conservation Fund	
2008	Roger Payne	whales	Ocean Alliance	
2010	Gerardo Ceballos	jaguars, black-footed ferrets	Institute of Ecology, National Autonomous University of Mexico	
2010	Rodney Jackson	snow leopards	Snow Leopard Conservancy	
2010	Laurie Marker	cheetahs	Cheetah Conservation Fund	
2010	Carl Safina	marine species, orcas, wolves, elephants	The Safina Center	
2010	Amanda Vincent	seahorses	Project Seahorse	
2012	Markus Borner	African species, rhinos	Frankfurt Zoological Society	
2012	Rodney Jackson	snow leopards	Snow Leopard Conservancy	
2012	Carl Jones	birds, reptiles	Durrell Wildlife Conservation Trust, Mauritian Wildlife Foundation	
2012	Russ Mittermeier	primates, turtles, tortoises, biodiversity hotspots	Global Wildlife Conservation	
2012	Patricia Wright	lemurs	Centre ValBio	
2014	Joel Berger	muskox, huemul	Wildlife Conservation Society	
2014	Gerardo Ceballos	jaguars, black-footed ferrets	Institute of Ecology, National Autonomous University of Mexico	
2014	Carl Jones	birds, reptiles	Durrell Wildlife Conservation Trust, Mauritian Wildlife Foundation	
2014	Russ Mittermeier	primates, turtles, tortoises, biodiversity hotspots	Global Wildlife Conservation	
2014	Carl Safina	marine species, orcas, wolves, elephants	The Safina Center	
2016	Joel Berger	muskox, huemul	Wildlife Conservation Society	
2016	P. Dee Boersma	penguins	Ecosystem Sentinels	
2016	Rodney Jackson	snow leopards	Snow Leopard Conservancy	
2016	Carl Safina	marine species, orcas, wolves, elephants	The Safina Center	
2016	Amanda Vincent	seahorses	Project Seahorse	
2018	Joel Berger	muskox, huemul	Wildlife Conservation Society	
2018	P. Dee Boersma	penguins	Ecosystem Sentinels	
2018	Sylvia Earle	marine species	Mission Blue	
2018	Rodney Jackson	snow leopards	Snow Leopard Conservancy	
2018	Carl Safina	marine species, orcas, wolves, elephants	The Safina Center	
2020	Caroline Blanvillain	birds	Ornithological Society of Polynesia	
2020	P. Dee Boersma	penguins	Ecosystem Sentinels	
2020	Christophe Boesch	chimpanzees	Wild Chimpanzee Foundation	
2020	Gerardo Ceballos	jaguars, black-footed ferrets	Institute of Ecology, National Autonomous University of Mexico	
2020	Sylvia Earle	marine species	Mission Blue	
2020	John Robinson	terrestrial species	Wildlife Conservation Society	
2023	Gladys Kalema-Zikusoka	mountain gorillas	Conservation Through Public Health	
2023	Biruté Mary Galdikas	orangutans	Orangutan Foundation International	
2023	Karen Eckert	sea turtles	Wider Caribbean Sea Turtle Conservation Network	
2023	Christophe Boesch	chimpanzees	Wild Chimpanzee Foundation	
2023	Gerardo Ceballos	jaguars, black-footed ferrets	Institute of Ecology, National Autonomous University of Mexico	
2025	Alberto Alves Campos	multiple species in Brazil	Aquasis	
2025	Lisa Dabek	tree kangaroos	Tree Kangaroo Conservation Program, Papua New Guinea	
2025	Biruté Mary Galdikas	orangutans	Orangutan Foundation International	
2025	Julie Packard	multiple marine species	Monterey Bay Aquarium	
2025	Lily-Arison René de Roland	multiple species in Madagascar	Madagascar Program, The Peregrine Fund	
2025	Lee James Taylor White	African forest elephant	Institute for Tropical Ecology Research, Gabon	

== Indianapolis Prize winners ==
Year	Winner	Animals studied	Organization	Sources
2006	George W. Archibald	Cranes	International Crane Foundation	
2008	George B. Schaller	Multiple species	Wildlife Conservation Society	
2010	Iain Douglas-Hamilton	Elephants	Save the Elephants	
2012	Steven Amstrup	Polar bears	Polar Bears International	
2014	Patricia Wright	Lemurs	Centre ValBio	
2016	Carl Jones	Birds, Multiple species	Durrell Wildlife Conservation Trust	
2018	Russell A. Mittermeier	primates, turtles, tortoises, biodiversity hotspots	Global Wildlife Conservation	
2020	Amanda Vincent	seahorses	Project Seahorse	
2023	Pablo Garcia Borboroglu	penguins	Global Penguin Society	
2025	Lily-Arison René de Roland	multiple species in Madagascar	Madagascar Program, The Peregrine Fund	

== See also ==
- List of environmental awards
