= Heather Koldewey =

British biologist

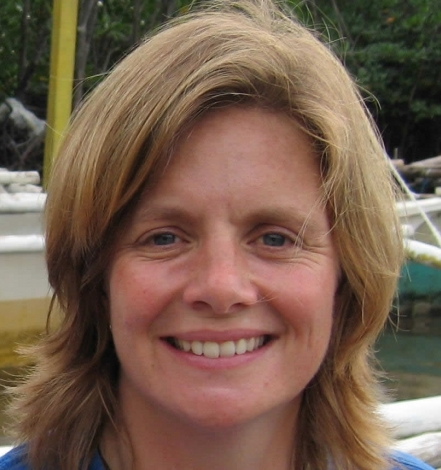
- Education: University of Plymouth; University of Wales, Swansea
- Known for: Seahorse biology and genetics Marine and freshwater conservation Impact of the aquarium trade on wild populations of fish and aquatic invertebrates
- Scientific career
- Fields: Marine biologist, conservationist
- Workplaces: Zoological Society of London; Project Seahorse

Heather J. Koldewey is the co-founder of Project Seahorse and head of marine and freshwater for the Zoological Society of London-London Zoo Aquarium. She additionally serves as an honorary professor for University of Exeter and a National Geographic explorer. Her research interests focus on marine and freshwater conservation, seahorse biology and genetics, and the impact of the aquarium trade on wild populations of fish and aquatic invertebrates.

== Education ==
Koldewey obtained a B.Sc. Biological Sciences (Marine and Fish Biology) at the University of Plymouth with First Class Honours in 1989. She then went on to receive a Ph.D. from the University College Swansea/University College London in 1993, where her thesis focused on the genetics of brown trout populations in Welsh rivers.

== Career and Research ==
In 1997, Koldewey became the Curator of the Aquarium and Reptile House at the London Zoo, and has worked to advance the role of aquariums in fish conservation globally. She was also involved in designing and building Biota!, an aquarium in Silvertown Quays in London. In September 2009, the landowner London Development Agency withdrew from the agreement, effectively ending the project. Beginning in 1998, she co-chaired a series of workshops that established the first co-ordinated conservation breeding programmes for fish and aquatic invertebrates in European aquariums. She has been engaged in marine and freshwater conservation efforts, including programmes in the UK, Philippines, Hong Kong, Sri Lanka, Mexico, Nepal and Mozambique.

=== Zoological Society of London ===
Currently, Koldewey is the Section Head of Global Programmes at the Zoological Society of London.

Koldeway uses collaborative approaches with ZSL to communicate and engage people in marine conservation. This includes Project Ocean – a partnership with Selfridges to bring ocean conservation to new audiences and change consumer buying habits, and One Less – a campaign working to make London the first capital city to stop using single-use plastic water bottles.

=== Project Seahorse ===
In 1996, Koldeway co-founded Project Seahorse with Dr. Amanda Vincent.

Koldewey is Chair of the Fish Section of the IUCN Re-introduction Specialist Group, and a UK government zoo inspector. She is the Section Head for Global Programmes at ZSL.

=== National Geographic Society ===
In research focusing on plastic pollution in Earth's waterways, Koldeway was appointed as a National Geographic fellow in 2018 and now serves as a National Geographic Explorer. She additionally acts as an Expedition Co-Lead for the National Geographic “Sea to Source: Ganges” river expedition.

== Selected publications ==
- Koldewey, H.J., Curnick D., Harding S., Harrison L.R., Gollock M. (2010) Potential benefits to fisheries and biodiversity of the Chagos Archipelago/British Indian Ocean Territory as a no-take marine reserve. Marine Pollution Bulletin.
- Koldewey, H.J. and K.M. Martin-Smith (2010) A global review of seahorse aquaculture. Aquaculture 32:131–152 doi:10.1016/j.aquaculture.2009.11.010
- Koldewey, H.J., Atkinson, J. and Shaw, A. (accepted). Threatened Species on the Menu? Towards sustainable seafood use in zoos and aquariums. International Zoo Yearbook.
- Koldewey, H.J., Jones, R., Shaw, A., Zimmerman, B. 2005. A New Approach to a New Conservation-led Aquarium. Proceedings of the International Aquarium Congress, USA.
