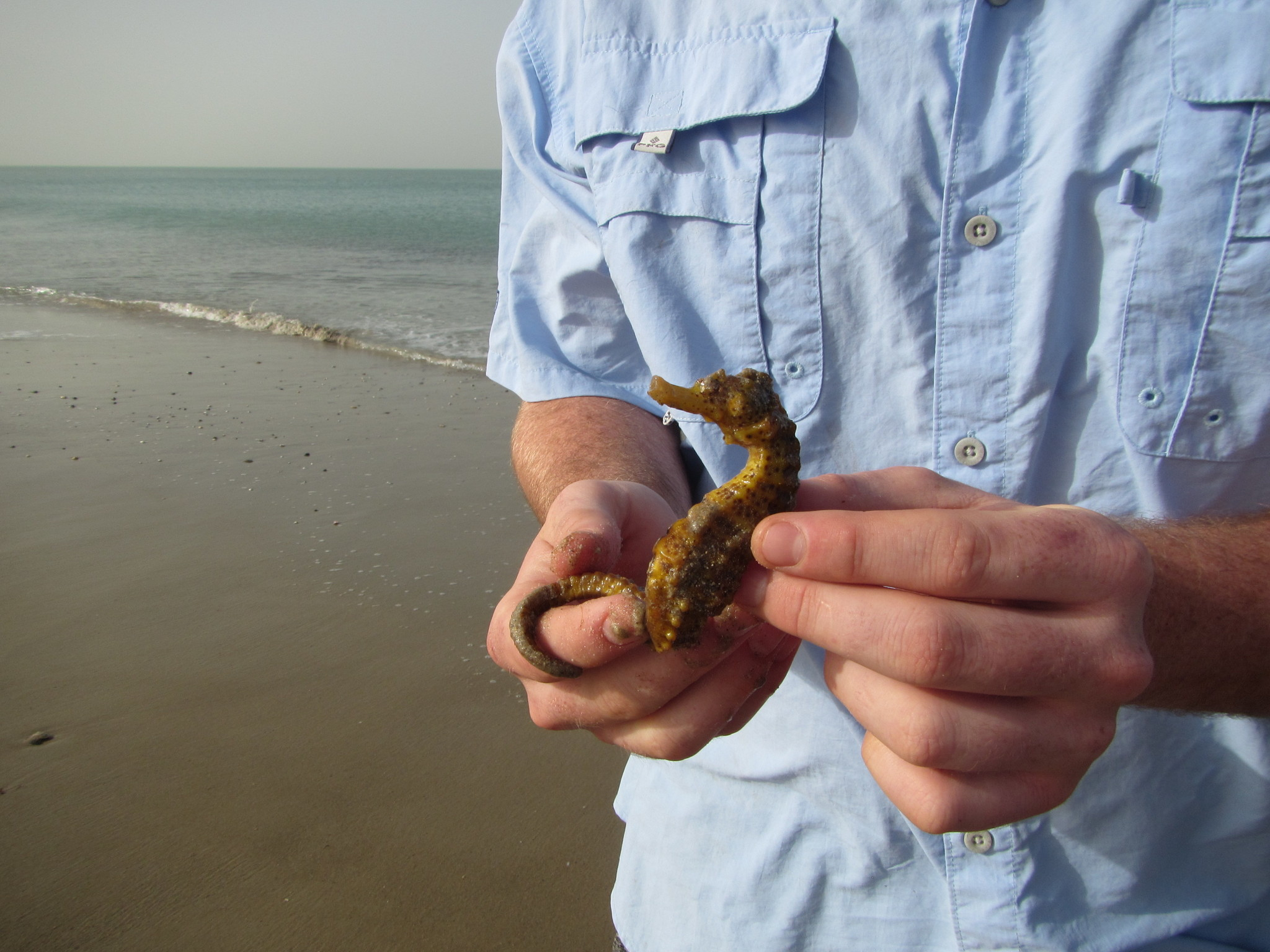

Conservation status
- Vulnerable (IUCN 3.1)
- CITES Appendix II

Scientific classification
- Kingdom: Animalia
- Phylum: Chordata
- Class: Actinopterygii
- Order: Syngnathiformes
- Family: Syngnathidae
- Genus: Hippocampus
- Species: H. algiricus

Binomial name
- Hippocampus algiricus Kaup, 1856

Synonyms
- Hippocampus deanei Duméril, 1857; Hippocampus kaupii Duméril, 1870; Hippocampus punctulatus Kaup, 1856

= West African seahorse =

Species of fish

The West African seahorse (Hippocampus algiricus) is a species of fish in the family Syngnathidae (Seahorses and pipefish). It is found in the eastern central Atlantic Ocean off Angola, Benin, Ivory Coast, Gambia, Ghana, Guinea, Liberia, Nigeria, São Tomé and Príncipe, Senegal, and Sierra Leone, as well as the Canary Islands. Although there have been no records from Algeria since Guichenot said that the type was collected at Béjaïa in the 1850s, but the location given may be an error.

There is scarce information despite conservation efforts for this species. The first records of the West African seahorse at Gran Canaria Island, located in the north-east Atlantic Ocean, were confirmed by genetic and morphometric analysis. This sighting of the West African seahorse in the Canary Islands could be due to the Canary current, West African coastal upwelling, trade winds, anthropogenic origin related to sporadic ship water ballast transport, or the climatic warming in the canary region making it suitable for them to live in. In turn, this has caused a hybridization event between the West African Seahorse and the European short-snouted seahorse (Hippocampus hippocampus), who already resides there.

It was first videotaped in 2012. The video is part of a joint investigation between Project Seahorse, Imperial College London, and the Zoological Society of London (ZSL) into West Africa's burgeoning seahorse trade. The number of seahorses exported, primarily to China for traditional medicine, has risen sharply in the last few years to about 600,000 seahorses annually. Meanwhile, scientists know virtually nothing about their numbers, habitat, or life cycle.

The efforts of Project Seahorse, directed by Dr. Amanda Vincent, resulted in the Convention on Trade in Endangered Species (CITES) adopting international trade controls for seahorses in 2002.
