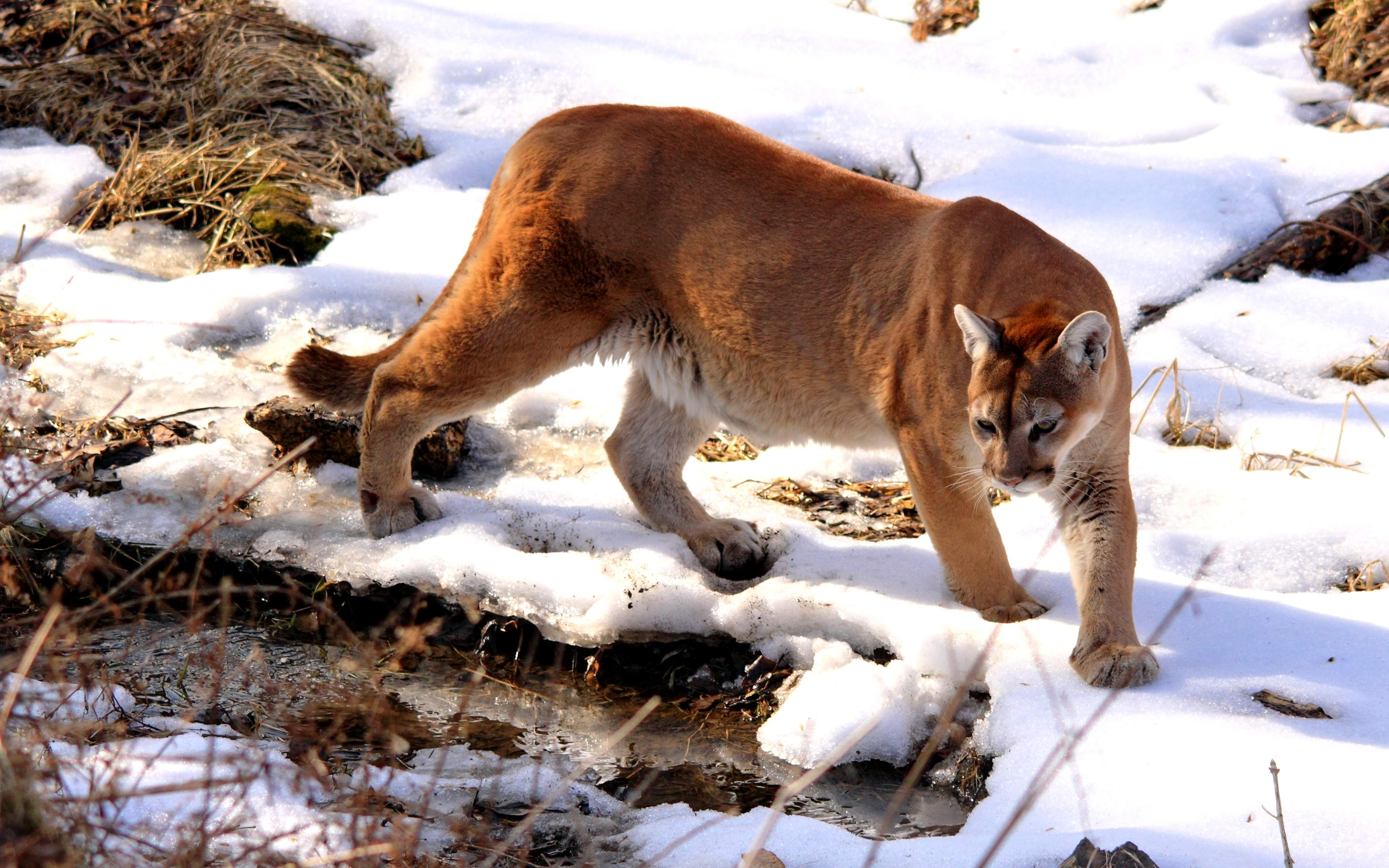
- A cougar at Wildlife Prairie Park in Illinois

Conservation status
- Secure (NatureServe) (Western and Central North America)

- Critically Imperiled (NatureServe) (Puma population)

Scientific classification
- Kingdom: Animalia
- Phylum: Chordata
- Class: Mammalia
- Order: Carnivora
- Family: Felidae
- Genus: Puma
- Species: P. concolor
- Subspecies: P. c. couguar

Trinomial name
- Puma concolor couguar (Kerr, 1792)

Synonyms
- P. c. arundivaga; P. c. aztecus; P. c. browni; P. c. californica; P. c. costaricensis (Merriam, 1901); P. c. floridana; P. c. hippolestes; P. c. improcera; P. c. kaibabensis; P. c. mayensis; P. c. missoulensis; P. c. olympus; P. c. oregonensis; P. c. schorgeri; P. c. stanleyana; P. c. vancouverensis; P. c. youngi

= North American cougar =

Subspecies of carnivore

The North American cougar (Puma concolor couguar) is a cougar subspecies in North America. It is the biggest cat in North America, and the second largest cat in the New World. It was once common in eastern North America and is still prevalent in the western half of the continent. This subspecies includes populations in western Canada, the western United States, Florida, Mexico and Central America, and possibly South America northwest of the Andes Mountains. It thus includes the extirpated eastern cougar and extant Florida panther populations.

== Taxonomic history ==
As of 2017, P. c. cougar was recognized as being valid by the Cat Classification Taskforce of the Cat Specialist Group. P. c. costaricensis had been regarded as a subspecies in Central America.

== Description ==
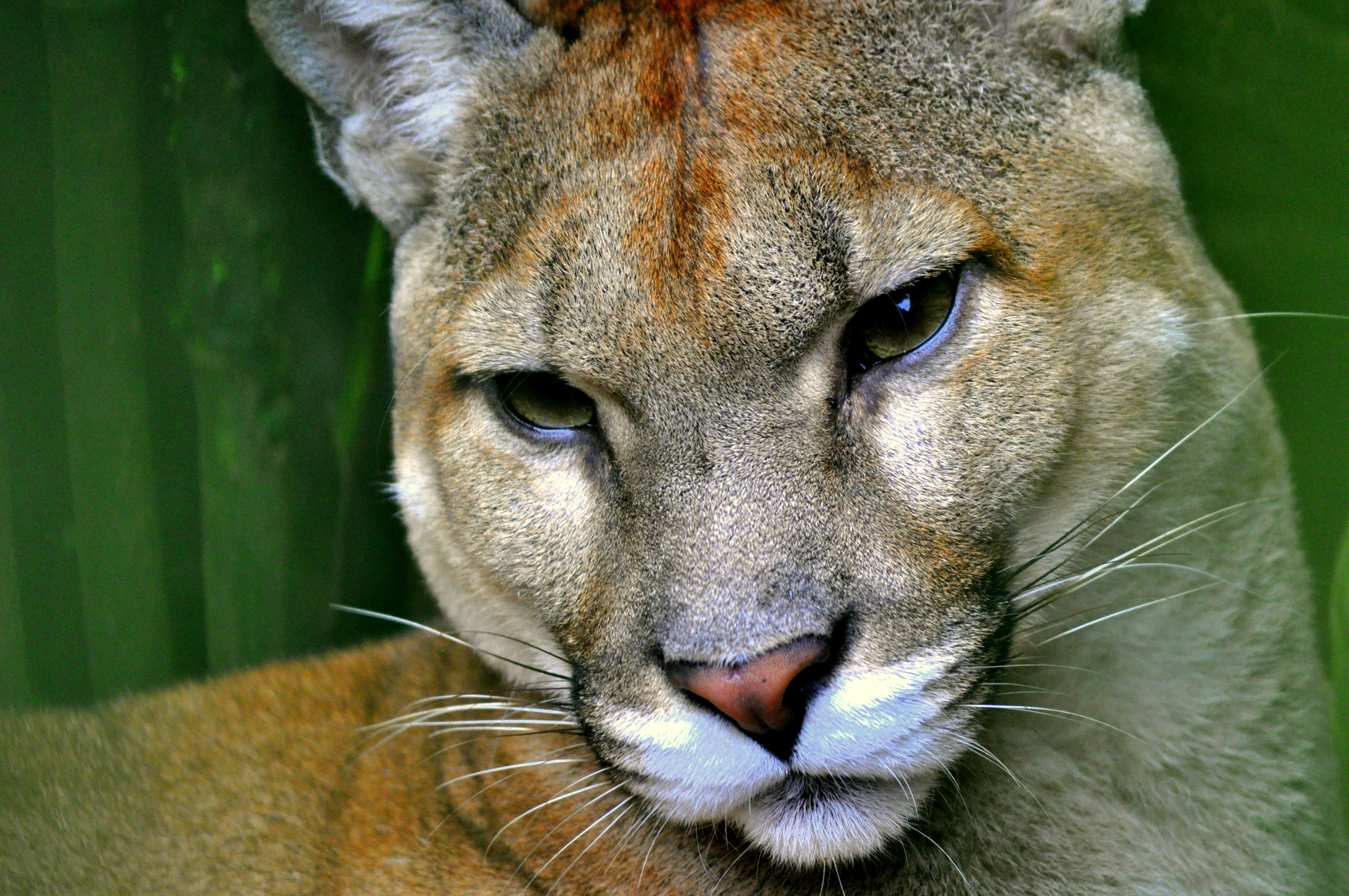
In Costa Rica, Central America

The North American cougar has a solid tawny-colored coat without spots, though the color can vary from buff to cinnamon-brown and juveniles may have mild leftover spotting. It weighs 25–80 kg (55–176 pounds). Females average 45 kg (99 lb), about the same as a jaguar in the Chamela-Cuixmala Biosphere Reserve on the Mexican Pacific coast.

== Habitat and distribution ==
The North American cougar lives in various places and habitats. Several populations still exist and are thriving in the western United States, Southern Florida, and western Canada, but the North American cougar was once commonly found in eastern portions of the United States. It was believed to be extirpated there in the early 1900s. In Michigan, it was thought to have been killed off and extinct in the early 1900s. There is evidence to support that cougars could be on the rise in Mexico and could have a substantial population in years to come. Some mainstream scientists believe that small relict populations may exist (around 50 individuals), especially in the Appalachian Mountains and eastern Canada. Recent scientific findings in hair traps in Fundy National Park in New Brunswick have confirmed the existence of at least three cougars in New Brunswick. The Ontario Puma Foundation estimates that there are 850 cougars in Ontario.

The Quebec wildlife services also considers cougars to be present in the province as a threatened species after multiple DNA tests confirmed cougar hair in lynx mating sites. The only unequivocally known eastern population is the critically endangered Florida panther. There have been unconfirmed sightings in Elliotsville Plantation, Maine (north of Monson) and as early as 1997 in New Hampshire.

=== Sightings in the United States ===
Reported sightings of cougars in the United States continue, including in locations of their former range where they are considered extirpated.

- California
  - The California Department of Fish and Game has roughly estimated 4,000 to 6,000 cougars present in California since 1972
  - Since 2002, more than 100 cougars have been sighted and tracked in the Santa Monica Mountains and neighboring mountains, including P-1, P-2, P-22, and P-64
  - In 2021, a cougar was sighted walking through a San Francisco neighborhood
  - In 2022, a cougar was sighted at a school in Daly City
- Minnesota
  - In Southern Minnesota there have been a few sightings by deer hunters; the Department of Natural Resources has verified 14 cougar sightings since 2007.
- Connecticut
  - In 2011, a cougar was sighted in Greenwich, Connecticut, and later killed by an SUV in Milford after allegedly travelling 1,500 miles (2,400 km) from South Dakota.
- Illinois
  - On April 14, 2008, a cougar triggered a flurry of reports before being cornered and killed in the Chicago neighborhood of Roscoe Village while officers tried to contain it. The cougar was the first sighted in the city limits of Chicago since the city was founded in 1833.

- On November 22, 2013, a cougar was found on a farm near Morrison in Whiteside County, Illinois. An Illinois Department of Natural Resources officer subsequently shot and killed the cougar after determining it posed a risk to the public.

- Michigan
  - According to the Michigan Department of Natural Resources, there were fifteen confirmed cougar sightings in the state in 2020 and, as of October, there had been ten confirmed sightings in the Upper Peninsula in 2021. The Department said that the steep increase in sightings may be attributable to the proliferation of trail cameras.
- Tennessee
  - On September 26, 2015, a hair sample was submitted by a hunter in Carroll County, Tennessee; DNA analysis indicated it was a female with genetics similar to cougars in South Dakota.
- Wisconsin
  - Genetic analysis of DNA from a cougar sighting in Wisconsin in 2008 indicated that a cougar was in Wisconsin and that it was not a captive animal. The cougar is thought to have migrated from a native population in the Black Hills of South Dakota; however, the genetic analysis could not affirm that hypothesis. Whether other, perhaps breeding, cougars are present is also uncertain. A second sighting was reported and tracks were documented in a nearby Wisconsin community. Unfortunately, a genetic analysis could not be done and a determination could not be made. This cougar later made its way south into the northern Chicago suburb of Wilmette.
  - On June 3, 2013, a verified sighting was made in Florence County, Wisconsin. The cougar was photographed by an automatic trail camera, and confirmed by DNR biologists in October, 2013.
  - In December, 2020, two sightings, one verified, were made in Dane County, in and around Stoughton, Wisconsin. The cougar was photographed by an individual, and confirmed by the Wisconsin DNR.
  - In November 2021, a DNR representative told WDJT-TV that the Department confirms about 15 cougar sightings per year in the state. While the origins of these animals are unknown, some cougar experts think some are captive animals that have been released or escaped.

== Ecology ==
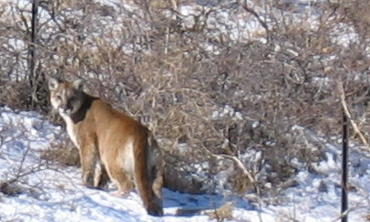
A cougar in the snow at North Cedar Brook in Boulder, Colorado

The North American Cougar is a carnivore and its main sources of prey are deer, elk, mountain goats, moose and bighorn sheep. Despite being a large predator, the North American Cougar can also be the prey of larger predators like wolves and bears. The North American cougar usually hunts at night and sometimes travels long distances in search of food. They are short distance sprinters and can remain hidden for hours to surprise unsuspecting prey and pounce when they least expect it. They use their strong jaws and large canines to puncture the neck of their prey, breaking the neck and efficiently killing their prey. They also grab their prey by the throat to suffocate it. It is fast and can maneuver quite easily and skillfully. Depending on the abundance of prey, such as deer, it shares the same prey as the jaguar in Central or North America. Other sympatric predators include the grizzly bear and American black bears. Cougars are known to prey on bear cubs. Cougars in the Great Basin have been recorded to prey on feral horses, as well as feral donkeys in the Sonoran and Mojave Deserts.

Rivalry between the cougar and grizzly bear was a popular topic in North America. Fights between them were staged, and those in the wilderness were recorded by people, including native peoples.

The North American Cougar plays an important role in regulating ecosystems as a large predator. The presence of the cougar as a predator prevents the overpopulation of herbivorous prey, like deer, in an ecosystem. Overpopulation of prey can result in the destruction of vegetation and biodiversity in an ecosystem.

== Reproduction ==
Adult male cougars can breed with multiple female cougars any time of the year, however the peak breeding season is in the months of January and August. When cougars are 2–3 years old, they reach the level of sexual maturity. The breeding process does not last a long time, with the male accompanying the female in heat for up to a week after which they separate. After mating, the male cougar plays no further role except driving off male intruders and the female cougar bears the full responsibility of raising her young. The average litter size is three cubs and each of the babies weigh a little over a pound (500 grams). Cougars have a 90–96 day gestation period, allowing the breeding process to continue throughout the year.

== Threats and conservation ==
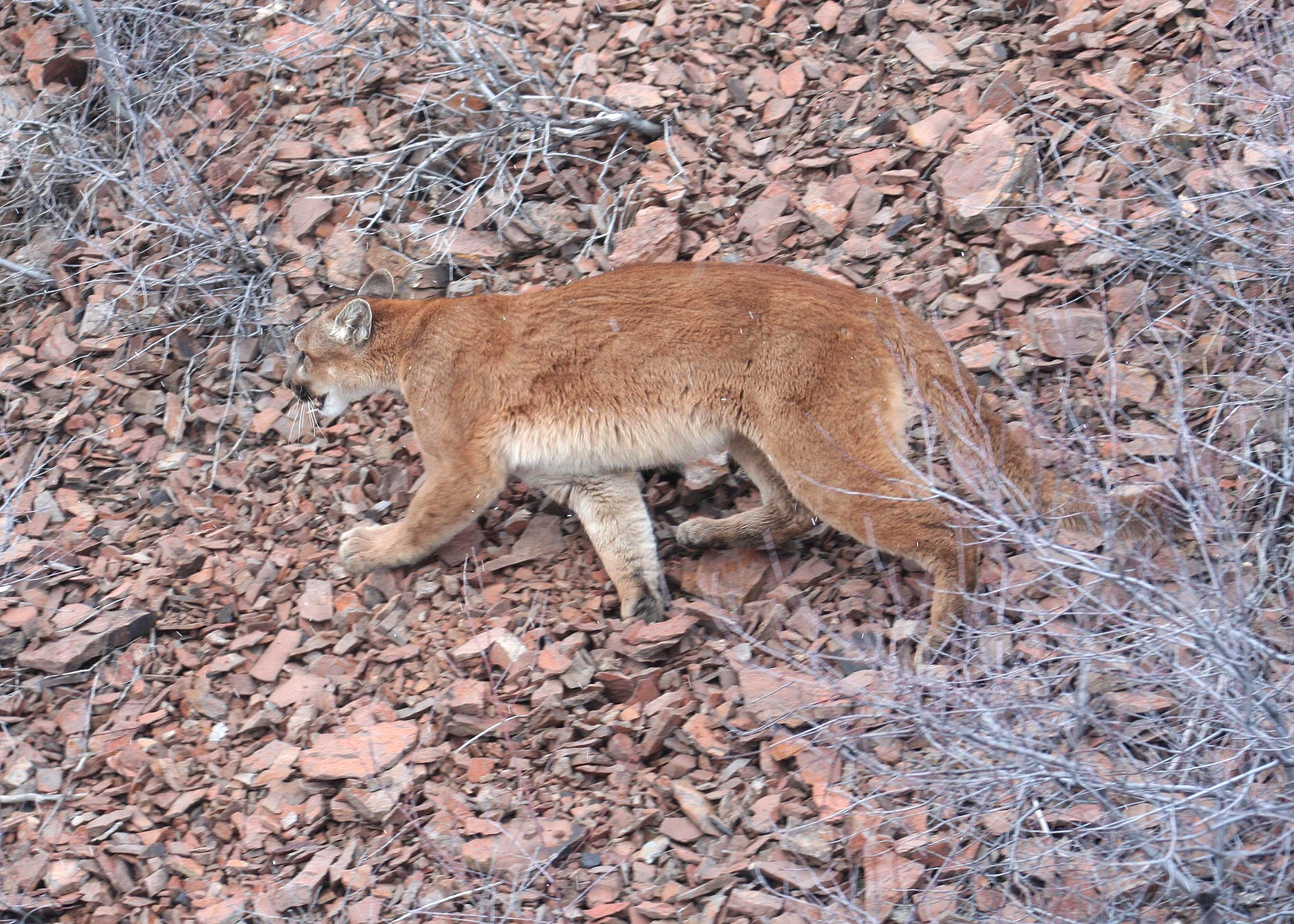
At Beulah Wildlife Management Unit in Malheur County, Oregon

The primary causes of the declining population of cougars is due to hunting and loss of habitat. Trophy hunting and loss of territory reflect the most significant threats upon the cougar extinction status. Most of the cougars' prey is found near humans. Whether it be through sport hunting or through the protection of livestock, humans frequently kill cougars intentionally. Though indirect killings through vehicle collisions do occur, the intentional human impact is far more drastic. Humans continue to affect the declining cougar population through the occupation of their habitats. Cougars tend to occupy areas that are prime for development and expansion. From mountains to deserts, humans utilize the cougar territory to build new sites and structures for their purposes. As a consequence, cougars lose their habitats which leads to conflict with humans.

Even though conservation efforts of the cougar have decreased against the "more appealing" jaguar, it is hunted less frequently because it has no spots, and is thus less desirable to hunters.

Despite the declining population of cougars, the potential extinction of the North American Cougar is not seen as a significant concern. In Oregon, a population of 5,000 individuals was reported in 2006, exceeding a target of 3,000. California has actively sought to protect the cat and has an estimated population of 4,000 to 6,000. With the increase of human development and infrastructure growth in California, the cougar population in the state is becoming more isolated from one another.

The Bay Area Puma Project aims to obtain information on cougar populations in the San Francisco Bay area and the animals' interactions with habitat, prey, humans, and residential communities. A study on wildlife ecologists showed that urban cougar populations exist around the Los Angeles metropolitan area, with individuals of these populations having the smallest home ranges recorded for any cougars studied, and being primarily nocturnal and not crepuscular, most likely adaptations to avoid humans in high-density areas.

== Communication and behavior ==
Cougars rely on scent, noises, and posture to communicate with each other to exchange messages. Each message depends on how the cougar delivers the sound. Growling, snarling and hissing is understood as a threat by other animals. Mother cougars chirp to communicate with their kittens. The caterwaul is a screeching sound made by female cougars during the mating season when competing males are present. Cougars use various methods to signal and communicate with each other. When cougars perceive a looming threat or danger nearby, they flatten their ears and either maintain eye contact with the threat or retreat to a less visible location in preparation to attack.

== See also ==
- Shasta (mascot)
- South American cougar
- American cheetah (extinct species related to the cougar, despite its name)
- Felinae
