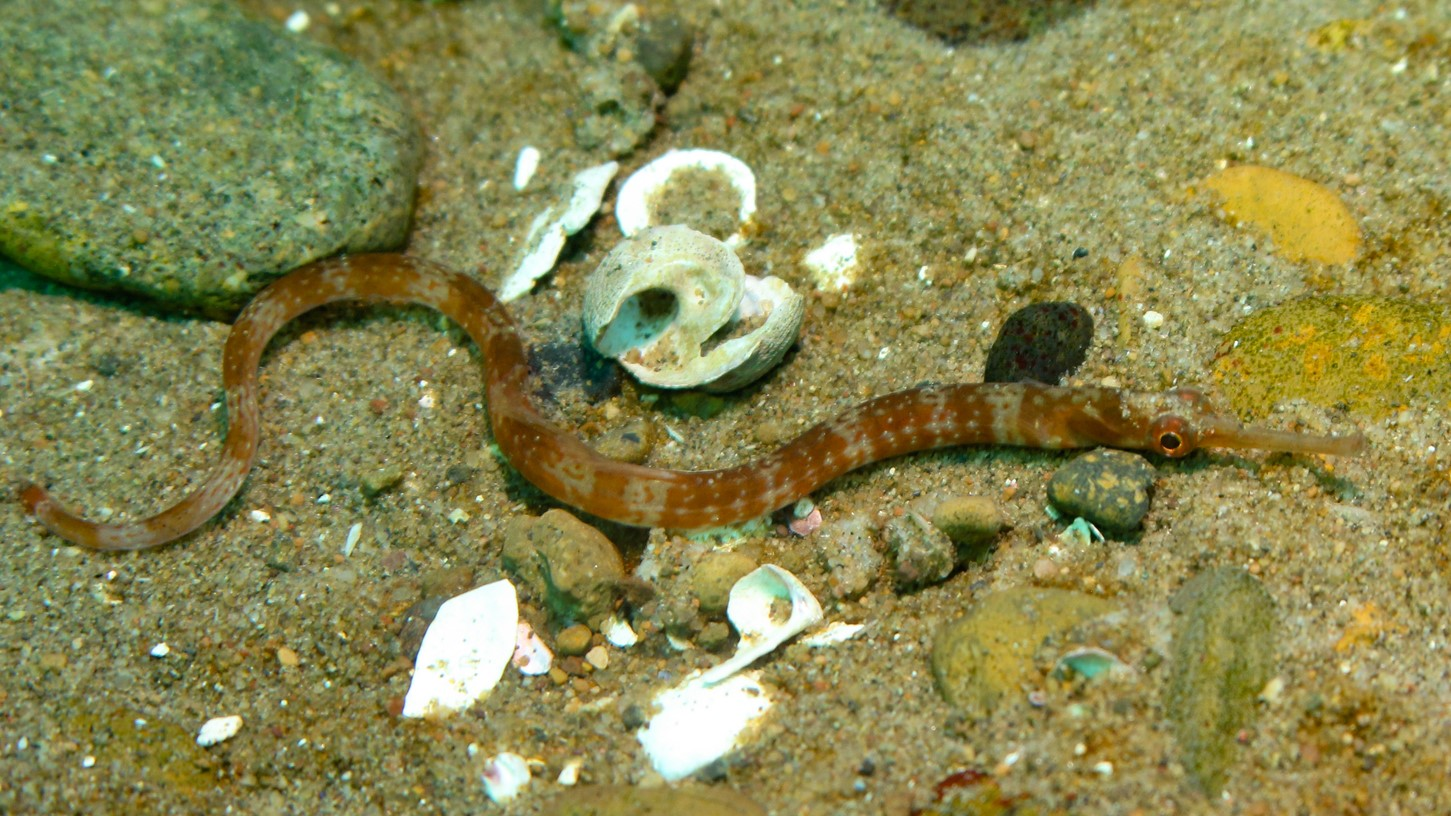

Scientific classification
- Kingdom: Animalia
- Phylum: Chordata
- Class: Actinopterygii
- Division: Teleostei
- Order: Syngnathiformes
- Family: Syngnathidae
- Genus: Leptonotus
- Species: L. vincentae

Binomial name
- Leptonotus vincentae Luzzatto & Estalles, 2019

= Leptonotus vincentae =

Species of fish

Leptonotus vincentae is a species of pipefish found in the south-western Atlantic Ocean.

== Description ==
This species reaches a length of 20.5 cm (8.1 in).

== Etymology ==
The fish is named in honor of ocean fisheries biologist Amanda Vincent of the University of British Columbia, Director and co-founder of Project Seahorse, "whose work on conservation of syngnathids has increased our chances of having healthy populations of these fishes in the threatened seas of the world."
