= Snow Leopard Conservancy India Trust =

Indian non-profit organization

The Snow Leopard Conservancy India Trust
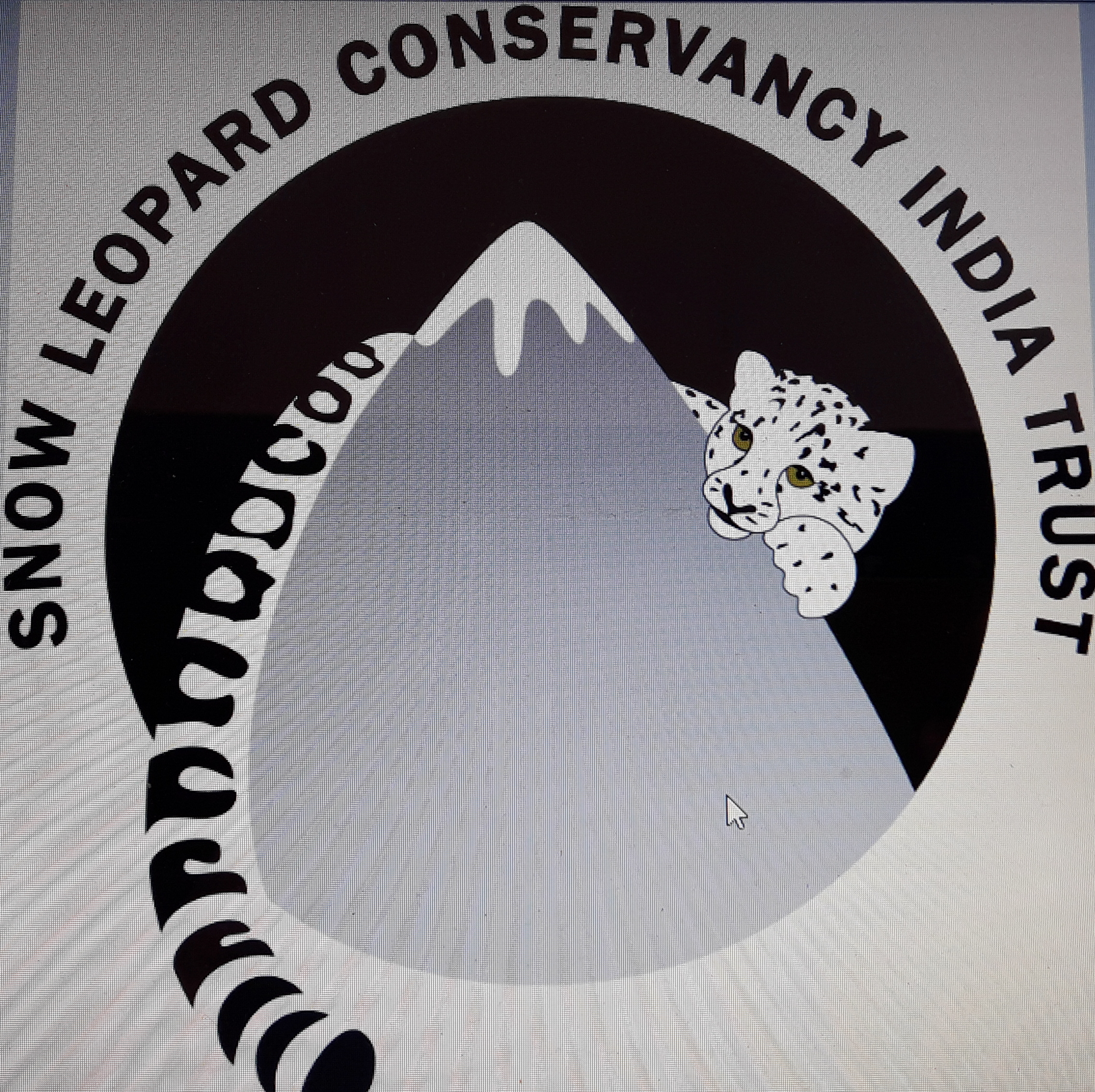
- Legal status: Charitable Trust
- Headquarters: Korban House, Changspa, Sheldan, Leh, Ladakh, India
- Location: Leh, Ladakh
- Services: Snow Leopard Conservation
- Board of directors: Mr. David Sonam (Managing Trustee); Mr. Renzino Lepcha (Trustee); Ms. Rigzin Dolma (Trustee)
- Key people: Late Mr. Rinchen Wangchuk (co-founder); Dr. Rodney Jackson (co-founder); Dr. Tsewang Namgail (Director)
- Affiliations: Panthera Corporation
- Website: snowleopardindia.org
- Formerly called: Snow Leopard Conservancy

The Snow Leopard Conservancy India Trust (SLC-IT) is a non-profit conservation organization for the protection of snow leopards (Panthera uncia), its prey species, and its habitat in Ladakh, India. The trust primarily focuses on the Indian range of the snow leopard. Apart from conservation and ecological research on the snow leopard, the SLC-IT initiated the Himalayan Homestay Program in 2003.

== History ==
The Snow Leopard Conservancy India Trust was formed in 2000 as the Indian branch of the Snow Leopard Conservancy. It became an independent organization of India in 2003.

== Community-based conservation ==
SLC-IT has been active at the community level and prioritizes Community-based conservation who share the resources with snow leopard and other mountain wildlife on a daily basis.

== Environmental education ==
The conservancy produces educational materials highlighting biodiversity and conservation issues in Ladakh. Partnering with Kalpavriksh, a Pune-based organization, in bringing up the Ri Gyancha (jewels of the mountains), a biodiversity resource kit for Ladakh, which has been used by both children and educators. Teacher training is an integral part of their educational initiatives, which also extend to providing education and training for graduate students and adults.

== Awards and recognition ==
- 2004 – First Choice Responsible Tourism Award at the World Travel Market
- 2005 – Global Vision Award for Community Outreach
- 2008 – Finalists in the Geo-tourism Challenge by National Geographic's Centre for Sustainable Destinations and Ashoka Changemakers
- 2013 – Favorite Responsible Tourism Initiative Award by Outlook Traveller
- 2015 – Earth Guardian Award by the Royal Bank of Scotland
- 2016 – IRTA-Gold in Best Contribution to Wildlife Conservation
- 2016 – IRTA-Overall Winner
- 2018 – Carl Zeiss Wildlife Conservation Award
- 2018 – TOFTigers Wildlife Tourism Award
