= Snow Leopard Trust =

US-based non-profit organization

The Snow Leopard Trust
- Formation: 1981; 45 years ago
- Founder: Helen Elaine Freeman
- Type: Nonprofit
- Tax ID no.: 91-1144119
- Legal status: 501(c)(3)
- Purpose: Snow leopard conservation
- Headquarters: Seattle, Washington
- Region served: China, India, Kyrgyz Republic, Mongolia, and Pakistan
- Members: 2500
- Board President: Rhetick Sengupta
- Executive Director: Charudutt "Charu" Mishra, PhD
- Board of directors: Rhetick Sengupta; Gayle Podrabsky; Gary Podrabsky; Barbara Blywise; Lisa Dabek, PhD; Todd George; Jed Gorden, MD; James Platts; Brad Rutherford; Stephen Sparrow
- Website: snowleopard.org

The Snow Leopard Trust is the largest and oldest organization working solely to protect the endangered snow leopard (Panthera uncia) and its habitat in 12 countries of Central Asia. The trust is a non-profit organization with its headquarters in Seattle, Washington. The present total population of snow leopards in the wild is estimated at between 3,920 and 6,390.

== History ==
The trust was founded in 1981 by Helen Elaine Freeman. Working as a volunteer at Seattle's Woodland Park Zoo, Freeman became fascinated with the snow leopards there and learned about their endangered plight. She later joined the staff of the zoo and was motivated to set up the trust to protect the snow leopard in the wild, and its habitat. She also began the trust’s philosophy of helping the people sharing the snow leopard’s habitat improve their standard of living in exchange for protecting the animal.

== Snow leopard conservation programs ==
The trust performs scientific research projects, manages community-level conservation programs, and fosters global collaboration amongst snow leopard experts and other snow leopard support groups.

The organization raises money through donations, grants, fundraising events and sales of products on its website shop, and is supported by zoos and other conservation organizations. The Snow Leopard Trust is recognized as a 4-star charity by Charity Navigator, and is a member of the Association of Zoos and Aquariums, European Association of Zoos and Aquariums, World Association of Zoos and Aquariums, International Species Information System, and Co-Op America.

Currently, the Snow Leopard Trust focuses its efforts in five snow leopard range countries: China, India, Mongolia, Pakistan, and Kyrgyzstan. In these countries, the trust employs and trains staff to carry out research, education, and conservation. In the seven other countries within the snow leopard range, the trust supports and collaborates with researchers and conservation organizations.

== Community-based conservation ==
Co-operation with communities in snow leopard range countries forms the basis of the trust's on-the-ground conservation work.

When a region has been identified as a place of significant snow leopard habitat, the trust works with local residents to understand their needs and then jointly develop conservation programs. These conservation programs must meet four important goals:

1. the protection of snow leopards and their habitat, involving local communities in this effort
2. an improved quality of life for the members of the community
3. the program developed must have a path to becoming self-sufficient so long term it is not dependent on donor dollars
4. the results of the program must be verifiable through monitoring programs.

Snow Leopard Enterprises (SLE) is one of the trust’s major community programs. Over 300 families in Mongolia, Kyrgyzstan and Pakistan participate by making handicraft products from the wool of their livestock to increase their income in return for helping protect the snow leopard in their region.

The families have all agreed to stop hunting snow leopards and prey species while also helping with anti-poaching activities. At the end of each year, communities receive a bonus when no poaching has occurred.

In 2011, the program won the BBC World Challenge, a global competition aimed at finding projects from around the world that have shown enterprise and innovation at a grass roots level.

== Science and research ==
Many open questions remain on the biology and behavior of the snow leopard. In order to answer these questions and design conservation programs accordingly, The Snow Leopard Trust conducts and supports snow leopard research. The following are some of the trust’s most current and impactful studies.

In 2008, the trust launched a long-term (10+ year) research project to take place in Mongolia’s South Gobi Province. Although there have been several valuable studies of the species to date, most were short-term, or at most four or five years in duration.

The aim of this project is to study all aspects of snow leopard ecology, and researchers will employ a variety of methods including trap cameras and GPS radio collaring. The trust has established a base camp in the Tost Mountains, approximately 250 km (160 mi) west of the provincial capital of Dalanzadgad, and in the first wave of researchers were scientists from Argentina, Mongolia, the United States and Sweden. A total of 18 snow leopards have been equipped with GPS tracking collars. This major study is a joint project of the Snow Leopard Trust and the Snow Leopard Conservation Foundation (Mongolia) and is carried out in partnership with Mongolia’s Ministry of Nature, Environment and Green Development and the Mongolia Academy of Sciences, Nordens Ark, Grimso and the Whitley Fund for Nature.

Prior to the launch of this long-term study, trust scientists captured a female snow leopard (named Bayad) in Chitral Gol National Park in northern Pakistan on 17 November 2006, fitting her with a GPS satellite collar in order to accurately collect detailed knowledge regarding the species’ movements and home range size. This was the first-ever study of wild snow leopards using GPS radio technology and was conducted by the Snow Leopard Trust in conjunction with Pakistan’s North West Frontier Province Wildlife Department and WWF–Pakistan.

Bayad is known to many from footage in the BBC’s Planet Earth and Natural World documentaries, and Mutual of Omaha’s Wild Kingdom series on Animal Planet. Bayad’s movements were tracked for a total of 14 months, and yielded more data than has ever been gathered using conventional VHF radio collars. In particular, researchers found that she traveled a 1,563 km^{2} (603 sq mi) area, splitting her time between Pakistan and Afghanistan.

Through its Indian partner NGO, Nature Conservation Foundation, and in collaboration with the Himachal Pradesh Forest Department, the trust will launch a similar, long-term snow leopard study in Spiti Valley, India, in the fall of 2014.

In 2006, in co-operation with geneticists Dr. Lisette Waits of the Laboratory for Ecological and Conservation Genetics at the University of Idaho and Dr. Warren Johnson of the Laboratory of Genomic Diversity, the Snow Leopard Trust identified several spots on the cats' DNA (microsatellite loci) that have enough variation to tell individual cats apart. With this discovery it is possible to test feces and hair specimens found in the field and identify individual cats.

== Partnerships and collaboration ==
When working in snow leopard range countries, the Snow Leopard Trust works with the following conservation organizations/NGOs: Snow Leopard Foundation (Pakistan), Snow Leopard Conservation Foundation (Mongolia), Nature Conservation Foundation (India), Snow Leopard Foundation (Kyrgyzstan) and Shan Shui Conservation Center (China).

The trust developed the Snow Leopard Information Management System (SLIMS) which now facilitates knowledge sharing of snow leopard research results around the world.

In 2013, the Snow Leopard Trust was a key technical partner and co-organizer of the Global Snow Leopard Conservation Forum, a gathering of all 12 snow leopard range countries jointly organized by the Office of the President of the Kyrgyz Republic Almazbek Atambayev and the State Agency on Environmental Protection and Forestry under the Government of the Kyrgyz Republic.

At the forum, held in Bishkek, Kyrgyz Republic, officials and conservationists discussed urgent actions and a new global strategy to address conservation of the endangered snow leopard and its habitat in the critical ecosystems of Central Asia; culminating in the adoption of the Bishkek Declaration on the Conservation of the Snow Leopard and the Global Snow Leopard Ecosystem Recovery Program (GSLEP). The trust continues to support the range countries in the implementation of the GSLEP.

== Snow Leopard Network ==
The trust supports the Snow Leopard Network (SLN), a collaborative network of organisations and government agencies from all over the globe working on snow leopard conservation. The SLN was started in 2002 at the Snow Leopard Survival Summit in Seattle, Washington, United States, as a means for snow leopard conservationists to co-operate on research and to address the challenges impacting the snow leopard’s survival while ensuring the livelihood opportunities of local people in snow leopard regions. The SLN produced the Snow Leopard Survival Strategy (SLSS) a report which presents a co-ordinated strategy for ensuring the endangered cat’s survival.

== Collaboration with zoos and other conservation organizations ==
The Snow Leopard Trust works with zoos and other conservation organisations worldwide, facilitating international conservation co-operation. In March 2008, the Snow Leopard Trust, WCS, the Snow Leopard Network, and Panthera Foundation organized an international conference in Beijing, China to bring together representative from all snow leopard range countries for the first time. Leading conservationists and researchers, as well as government officials from 11 of the 12 snow leopard range countries were among the more than 100 conference attendees. Dr. George Schaller, one of the first people to ever study snow leopards, and Dr. Urs Breitenmoser, co-Chair of the IUCN Cat Specialist Group, delivered keynote address. Outputs of the conference include an updated map of snow leopard range, country-specific action plans and three resolutions.

1. All range countries should expedite development of a Snow Leopard Action Plan, or implement existing plans to the fullest extent.
2. Each country will designate a national snow leopard focal point from a relevant institution to coordinate with the Snow Leopard Network and other focal points for the exchange of information at the national and international level.
3. Range state governments will develop mechanisms (e.g., Memoranda of Understanding) to promote transboundary cooperation on matters such as trade, research and management relevant to snow leopard conservation that include, inter alia, the impacts of climate change on distribution and long-term survival of snow leopards, and where possible incorporate positive actions within conservation programs (e.g., carbon neutral projects).

Zoos also have an important role to play in snow leopard conservation. More than 50 zoos worldwide participate in the Snow Leopard Trust’s Natural Partnerships Program. There are many ways that zoos can be involved in the Natural Partnerships Program, including selling Snow Leopard Enterprises merchandise through their gift shops, offering joint membership agreements, hosting Snow Leopard Trust speakers, and displaying educational materials. The signature element of the Natural Partnerships Program is the opportunity for zoos to get directly involved with the trust's conservation programs in the snow leopard's range countries.

== Grants program ==
Conservationists and educators working on the ground in snow leopard countries often have limited resources and the grants program will support them in any projects that meet the needs identified in the Snow Leopard Survival Strategy (SLSS).
