= Lee White (conservationist) =

Gabonese politician (born 1965)

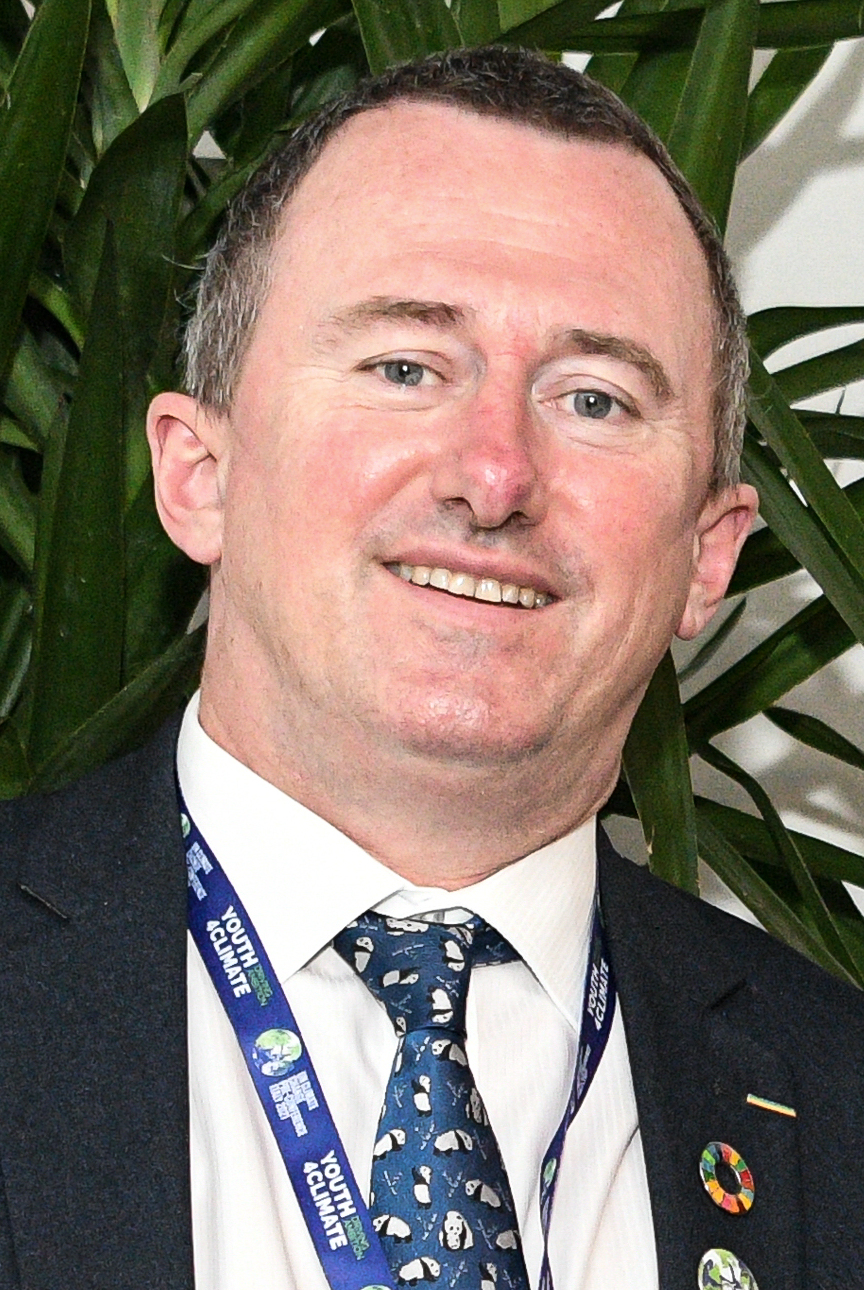
- White in 2021

Minister of Water, Forest, the Sea and Environment of Gabon
- In office 2019–2023
- President: Ali Bongo Ondimba

Personal details
- Born: 26 July 1965 (age 60) Manchester, United Kingdom

Lee James Taylor White CBE (born 26 July 1965) is a British-Gabonese conservationist and environmental policy expert who serves as Special Envoy to the Science Panel for the Congo Basin. He is an Honorary Professor at the University of Stirling and has authored more than 125 scientific papers and numerous books on the ecology and conservation of African rainforests.

White served as the Gabonese Minister of Water, Forests, the Sea and Environment from 2019 to 2023, and and has worked in the fields related to climate change, the preservation and management of natural resources, protected areas and ecotourism. White was tasked with managing deforestation and illegal logging and the country's population of African Forest Elephants. He oversaw the creation of Gabon's carbon credits program in 2022.

White was quoted by The New York Times as saying that without countries like Gabon leading in conservation as "examples of countries where we are solving the problems, then who is anyone else going to learn from?" He was appointed Commander of the British Empire in the 2010 Birthday Honours for services to conservation.

Following the 2023 Gabonese coup d'état, it was reported that White had been replaced as a government minister under the Committee for the Transition and Restoration of Institutions.

In 2025, Dr. White was an Indianapolis Prize DeHaan Finalist.

== Career ==
White began his career working on conservation projects in West Africa, including the Tiwai Primate Project in Sierra Leone and work with the Nigerian Conservation Foundation.

In 2009, he was appointed Executive Secretary of Gabon's National Parks Agency (ANPN), which manages the country's national park system.

In June 2019, White was appointed Gabonese Minister of Water, Forests, the Sea and Environment.

=== Science Panel for the Congo Basin ===
In 2024, White was appointed Special Envoy to the Science Panel for the Congo Basin (SPCB), an international scientific initiative focused on the conservation and sustainable management of the Congo Basin. The panel brings together scientists and experts to assess biodiversity, ecosystems, and socio-economic conditions in the region. As Special Envoy, White plays a diplomatic and strategic role in advancing the panel's visibility and was nominated for the Indianapolis Prize for conservation.

In 2025, the SPCB released its first major publication, Congo Basin Assessment Report: Congo Basin Resilience and Sustainability, From the Past to the Future, a 800-page synthesis published by Springer. White served as one of the report’s Editors-in-Chief and was the lead author of the Executive Summary. The SPCB aims to position the Congo Basin as central to global climate change mitigation, biodiversity conservation, and sustainable development efforts, while promoting increased investment in African-led scientific research and locally driven conservation strategies.
