= Laurie Marker =

American cheetah researcher and conservationist

Laurie Marker is an American zoologist, researcher, author, educator, and one of the world's foremost cheetah experts, who founded the Cheetah Conservation Fund (CCF) in 1990. As executive director of CCF, among many endeavors, Marker helps rehabilitate cheetahs and reintroduce them to the wild, performs research into conservation, biology and ecology, educates groups around the world, and works toward a holistic approach to saving the cheetah and its ecosystems in the wild. Before her work with CCF, Marker's career started to take off at the Wildlife Safari in the U.S., where her interest with captive cheetahs began.

== Early life ==
Laurie Marker (née Laura Lee Bushey) was born in Detroit, Michigan and lived in Birmingham, a suburb of Detroit. Her father, Ralph, came from a farming family and was an agricultural economist and accountant. Her mother, Marline, was an elementary and high school teacher and kept the family active in the community with nonprofit work.

Marker's family moved to Southern California when she was four years-old. She spent her childhood surrounded by animals, learning how to care for horses, dogs, cats, rabbits, donkeys and goats. Marker's family resettled in Palos Verdes, and later in San Jose, both in Northern California (USA), in time for her to finish high school at age 16. There she solidified her love for animals, starting with her dogs, and her horse on which she competed locally. She started college early at San Francisco State University, intending to become a veterinarian, but the emerging wine industry in the Napa Valley caught her eye.

She enrolled in the agriculture, enology and viticulture programs at Napa Valley College. While there she re-opened the Pope Valley Winery, in Angwin, which had been closed since prohibition. She also began operating a dairy goat farm.

== Career beginnings ==
Marker soon moved her wine and goat operations to Oregon, where she founded Jonicole Vineyards. In 1974, to make ends meet, she began working at the newly opened local exotic animal park, Wildlife Safari, in Winston Oregon, where her tenure spanned 16 years. She was fascinated by the cheetahs she met there, and was struck by how little was collectively known about them in the scientific community. Marker decided to extensively study the ten cheetahs at Wildlife Safari and began developing what eventually became the most successful captive breeding program in the country.

She had inadvertently become one of the world's foremost experts on cheetahs, and began teaching zoo keepers and other captive breeders her techniques, and slowly expanded her research.

In 1977, Marker took a trip to South West Africa (now Namibia), which contained the largest living population of wild cheetahs. She brought with her a captive-born cheetah named Khayam, in order to test her theory that captive-raised cheetahs could be taught to hunt in a wild setting, and could potentially survive if released. While there, she learned that cheetahs were being killed by farmers at an unsustainable rate of around 900 per year, mostly due to the cats being misunderstood and wrongly accused of killing their livestock.

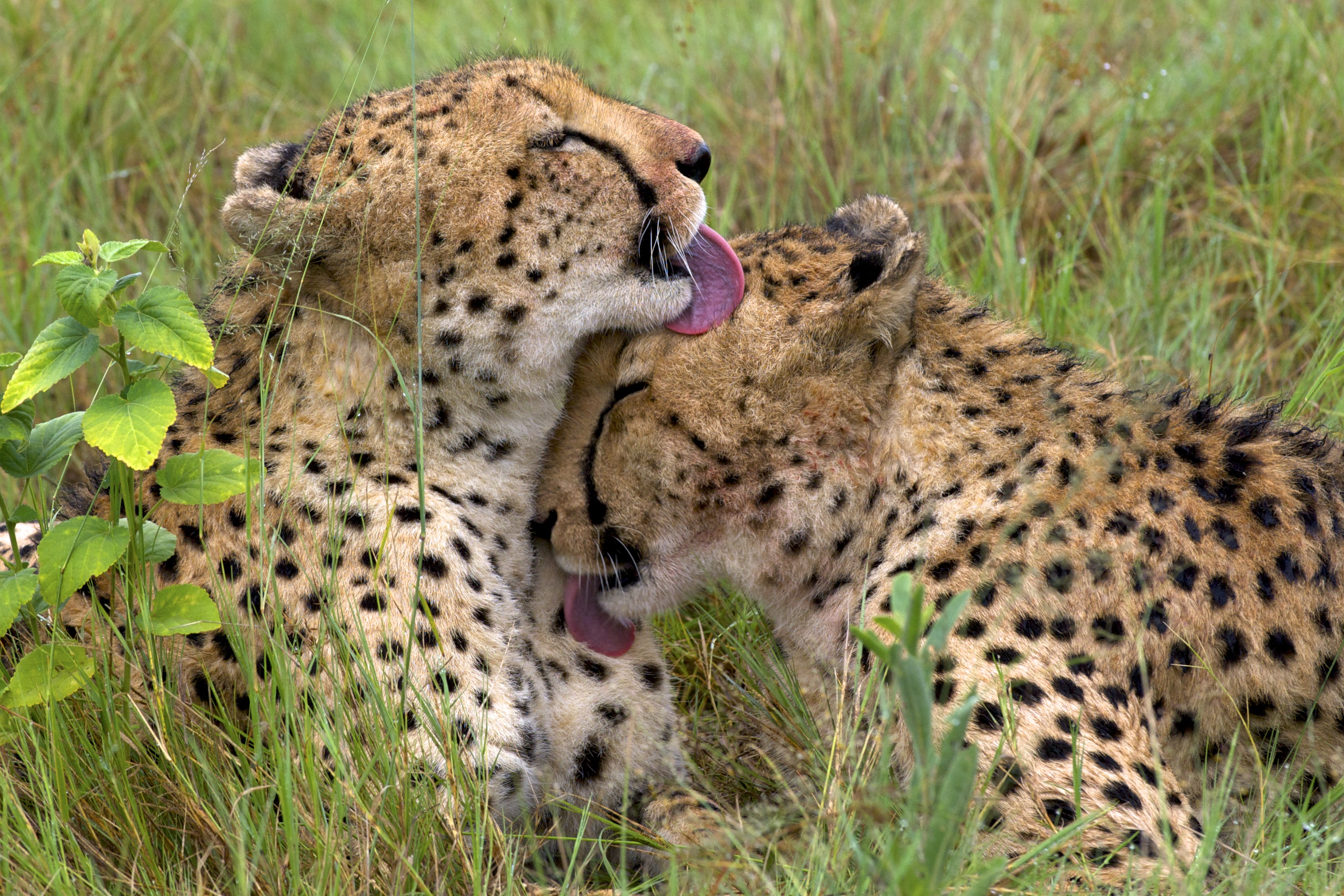
Cheetah brothers grooming.

When Marker returned with Khayam to the U.S. several months later following their successful research project, they traveled regionally and nationally making public appearances to generate awareness for the cheetah's plight. Khayam served as the first ambassador animal for her species. International Cheetah Day is now celebrated every year on December 4, Khayam's birthday, in her honor.

For the next ten years, Marker continued traveling to Africa to learn more about the wild cheetah's problems and what could be done to assist endangered populations.

From 1988 to 1991, Marker served as executive director at the Smithsonian Institution's Center for New Opportunities in Animal Health Sciences (NOAHS), in Washington DC.

== Cheetah conservation work ==
In 1990, Marker founded the Cheetah Conservation Fund (CCF), which began as a research outpost in a small farmhouse on some land in Otjiwarongo, Namibia. She got the funding to purchase and start the initial facility by selling all of her possessions. Marker saw the problem of saving cheetahs as a holistic issue, in which local communities, farmers and governments needed to participate together for mutual goals. She created programs to aid farmers by providing free training in predator identification and livestock husbandry techniques to increase understanding and decrease losses. CCF has since bloomed into a world-renowned ecotourism venue, and a conservation, research and education facility which reaches thousands of farmers, tens of thousands of students, and hundreds of thousands of online supporters worldwide.

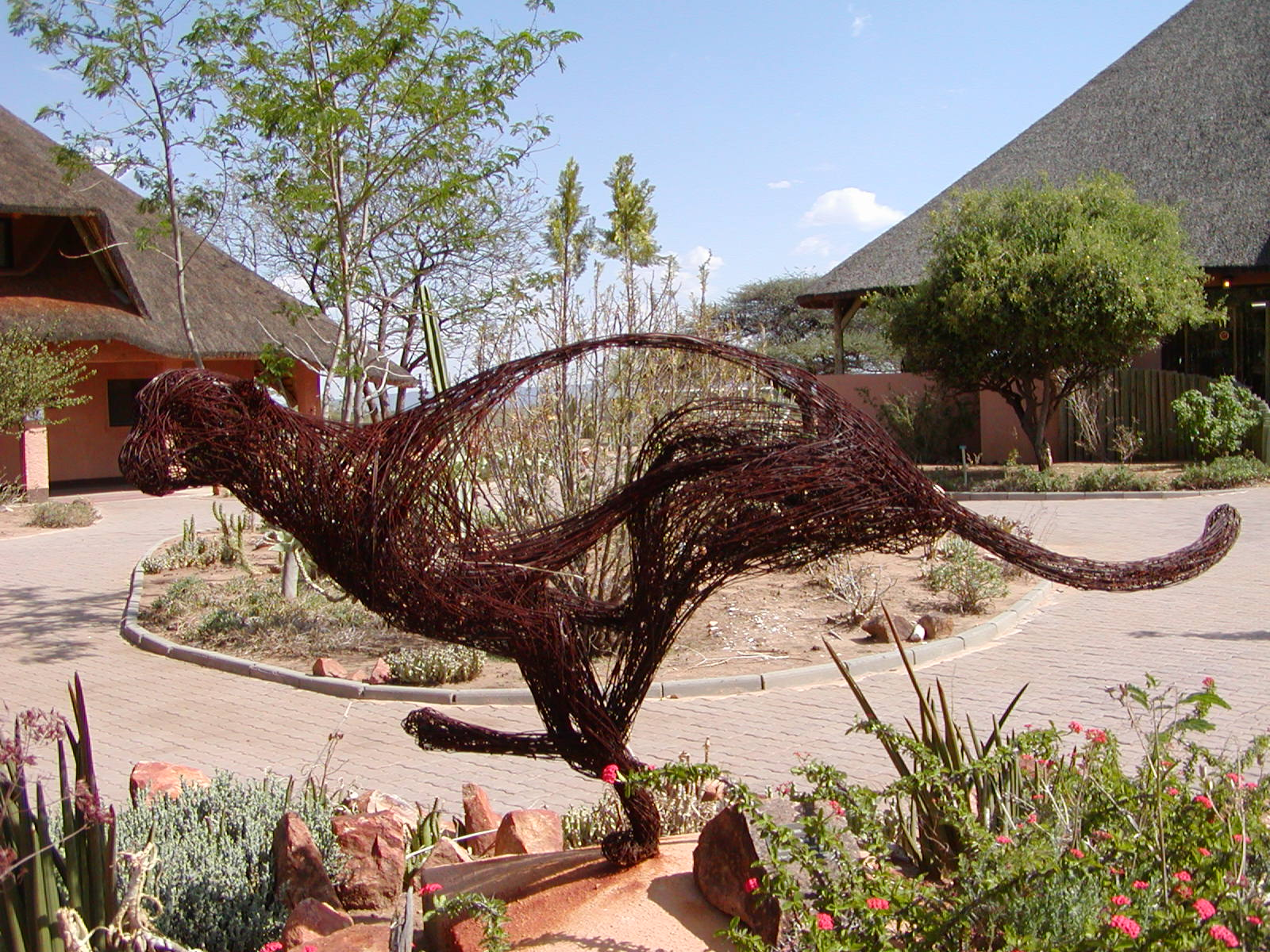
The Cheetah Conservation Fund Facility courtyard.

CCF has grown from sponsors and donations over the years and now occupies over 165,000 acres of mixed-use land. The facility rehabilitates and releases captured or injured wild cheetahs in Namibia, and offers a safe place for non-releasable cheetahs to live out their lives as educational ambassadors for their species. Visitors, educational groups, interns, scientific study groups, and volunteers are also accepted at the CCF Namibia facility throughout the year.

Another integral program began in 1994 with the Livestock Guarding Dog Program. This provides farmers an economical solution to predator conflict, in the form of specially-bred Anatolian Shepherd and Kangal livestock guarding dogs to safely keep cheetahs and other predators away from livestock, which has changed people's attitudes towards cheetahs and has been found to reduce livestock losses by 80-100%. The program has placed over 650 dogs with farmers across Namibia and continues to expand. CCF has since helped launch similar programs with sister organizations in South Africa, Botswana and Tanzania.

2006 saw the creation of Future Farmers of Namibia, a program which educates and promotes sustainable farming cooperatives using an integrated system of non-lethal wildlife and ecosystem management.

A model farm on the CCF property houses more than 1,000 head of livestock (cows, goats and sheep) and serves to promote effective and safe animal husbandry practices, along with a creamery which showcases products from the model farm. The Bushblok green energy technology project and the Biotechnology Demonstration Centre aim to bring ecological management and holistic solutions to the problems of thornbush encroachment and energy creation with sustainable land use, for local and expanding international parties.

CCF Namibia also houses the only cheetah genetics laboratory in Africa, the Life Technologies Conservation Genetics Laboratory, which holds the world's largest wild cheetah database of biological material samples, collected from over a thousand cheetahs. There is also a fully functioning Veterinary Clinic on the premises.

On March 1, 2020, Marker and her team, along with the Vice President of Somaliland, Abdirahman Saylici, with Minister Shukri Bandare of the Ministry of Environment & Rural Development, and a large group of Somaliland government ministers and VIPs, officially opened a CCF branch in Hargeisa, Somaliland where the illegal trafficking of wild-caught cheetahs for the exotic pet trade has become a major problem. Dozens of orphaned cheetah cubs now live at CCF's Somaliland Cheetah Safe House, where cubs are placed after being rescued from wildlife traffickers. Plans are in the works and funding is being gathered for the purpose of building a large, fenced nature reserve, which will be the first national park in Somaliland, on which the rehabilitated cheetahs can be released to live wild again.

Several other programs, their government liaison work, and the relationships and education that CCF has provided local farmers, land owners and stakeholders in cheetah hold-out areas has significantly reduced the killing of wild cheetahs. Marker and the CCF team continues to educate, fundraise, develop holistic programs, and work with scientific bodies, governments and individuals around the world for the conservation of cheetahs in the wild. She currently has over 90 paid employees, many of which are local Namibians, working with her at CCF Namibia. Another few dozen paid staff work out of the Somaliland facility, and in the US, UK and Israel.

== Continuing scientific contributions ==
In the early 1980s, with collaborators at the Smithsonian Institution's National Zoo and National Cancer Institute (USA), Marker helped identify the cheetah's lack of genetic variation, thus causing the species greater problems for survival. Recognizing the issues with captive breeding difficulty and the need for exceptional record keeping to ensure the species' genetic diversity and proper selective mating protocols, in 1987 she developed the International Cheetah Studbook, a registry of captive cheetahs worldwide, and is currently the International Studbook Keeper. Collaboration with the two above listed institutions lead to Marker becoming executive director of the Centre for New Opportunities in Animal Health Sciences (NOAHS), in 1988, based at Smithsonian Institution's National Zoo. She continues to serve as a NOAHS Research Fellow.

Since 1988, Marker has been a Member of the IUCN/SSC Conservation Specialist Group - Cheetah Species Survival Plan, and a Propagation Committee Advisor (AZA/SSP). From 1991 to present she is a Member of the IUCN/SSC, Captive Breeding Specialist Group. In 2001 she began work as a member of the IUCN/SSC Cat Specialist Core Group.

In 1995 she became the Species Coordinator for the Cheetah African Preservation Program, and in 1996, a member of the Waterberg Conservancy Executive Committee, and the Namibian Veterinary Association.

Marker graduated in 2002 from Oxford University with a doctorate in zoology.

More recently, Marker joined the Steering Committee of the Greater Waterberg Complex, Namibia, in 2011, and the Steering Committee of the Natural Resource Department at Namibia University of Science and Tech in 2012.

In 2021 she became a member of the Scientific Board of the Mountain Lion Foundation, in California, USA, and was a Founding Member of the Board of Trustees for the Arabian Leopard Fund in Saudi Arabia.

The CCF Namibia Biotechnology Demonstration Centre and the CCF Life Technologies Conservation Genetics Laboratory both continue ground-breaking work in energy, ecology, genetic and veterinary projects.

Marker has authored or co-authored numerous scientific papers, across a range of topics, recently including: Recommendations for the rehabilitation and release of wild-born, captive-raised cheetahs: the importance of pre- and post-release management for optimizing survival. February 16, 2022 by Walker E., Verschueren S., Schmidt-Küntzel A., Marker L. L. Restoration thinning reduces bush encroachment on freehold farmlands in north-central Namibia. October 4, 2021 by Nghikembua M., Marker L. L., Brewer B., Leinonen A., Mehtätalo L., Appiah M., Pappinen A. Global dataset for seized and non-intercepted illegal cheetah trade (Acinonyx jubatus) 2010–2019. February 16, 2021 by Tricorache, P., Yashphe, S., Marker L. L. Twenty-five years of livestock guarding dog use across Namibian farmlands. February 11, 2021 by Marker L. L., Pfeiffer L., Siyaya A., Seitz P., Nikanor G., Fry B., O'Flaherty C., Verschueren S.

Marker continues to travel the world, giving educational talks and presentations, fundraising and running the Cheetah Conservation Fund facilities in Namibia and Somaliland. She continues to collaborate with scientists and conservationists to increase knowledge and awareness for the cheetah and its endangered status, to develop best practices in research, education, and land use to benefit all species, including people, and to develop sustainable systems that are protective of the environment, socially responsible, and economically viable, and to save the cheetah and their ecosystems from extinction.

== Awards & recognitions ==
- 1988 - White Rose Award, Oregon's Top Ten Women.
- 1992 - Conservationist of the Year, African Safari Club, Washington, DC.
- 2000 - Marker was recognized as one of Time Magazine's Heroes for the Planet. Burrows Conservation Award, Cincinnati Zoo
- 2001 - Windhoek Rotary Club's Paul Harris Fellowship Award.
- 2002 - Marker received a special award from the Sanveld Conservancy, signifying Namibia's farming community's public acknowledgement of Dr. Marker and CCF's contributions.
- 2003 - Chevron-Texaco Conservationist of the Year.
- 2005 - Living Desert's Track's in the Sand – Conservationist of the Year.
- 2008 - Zoological Society of San Diego's Lifetime Achievement Award. Tech Museum's Intel Environmental Award, Society of Women Geographers' Gold Medal, Indianapolis Prize Finalist.
- 2009 - BBC World Challenge Finalist, St Andrews Prize for the Environment Finalist, International Wildlife Film Festival Lifetime Achievement Award.
- 2010 - Tyler Prize for Environmental Achievement. Finalist for the BBC World Challenge Award. The Explorers Club Lowell Thomas Award, Indianapolis Prize Finalist.
- 2011, 2012 - Rainer Arnhold Fellow.
- 2013 - Andrew D. White Professor-at-Large, Cornell University, International Conservation Caucus Foundation(ICCF) Good Steward Award.
- 2015 - Ulysses S. Seal Award for Innovation in Conservation, E.O. Wilson Biodiversity Technology Pioneer Award, Eleanor Roosevelt Val-Kill Medal Award.
- 2020 - Explorers Club President's Award for Conservation.

== Publications ==
- A Future for Cheetahs (2014) by Dr. Laurie Marker (author), Suzi Ezsterhas (photographer).
- Chewbaaka (2017) by Dr. Laurie Marker and Jessie Jordan.
- Cheetahs: A Celebration of Speed and Elegance (2018) by Dr. Laurie Marker (author), Suzi Ezsterhas (photographer).
- Teacher's Resource Guide: A Predator's Role in the Ecosystem (multiple editions) By Dr. Laurie Marker and The Cheetah Conservation Fund.
- Cheetahs – Biology and Conservation (2018) A volume in the Series: Biodiversity of the World: Conservation from Genes to Landscapes; edited by Laurie Marker; Lorraine K. Boast; Anne Schmidt-Küntzel. Series Editor – Philip J. Nyhus.
