= Helen Freeman (conservationist) =

American conservationist specializing in snow leopards (1932-2007)

Helen Elaine Freeman (March 10, 1932 – September 20, 2007) was an American conservationist and endangered species advocate, who specialized in saving snow leopards. She was best known for founding the Snow Leopard Trust. Her preservation work earned her the nickname, the "'Jane Goodall' of Snow Leopards."

== Early life ==
She was born Helen Maniotas in Everett, Washington, on March 10, 1932. She was the only child of Greek immigrants and raised in Everett.

Freeman graduated with a bachelor's degree in Business Administration from Washington State University in 1954. She later obtained a second degree in Animal Behavior from the University of Washington in 1973.

She met her husband, Stanley Freeman, through mutual friends at the United States Coast Guard. The couple were married for 49 years.

== Snow leopards ==
Freeman's interest in Snow Leopards began while she was a volunteer docent at the Woodland Park Zoo in Seattle. The zoo acquired two Snow Leopards, named Nicholas and Alexandra, from the Soviet Union in 1972.

Freeman eventually became the curator of education at the Woodland Park Zoo. She held that position when she founded the Snow Leopard Trust in 1981. The original purpose of the trust was to help zoos keep Snow Leopards, which are endangered in their home ranges in Central Asia, more successfully. She often traveled to Asia, Europe and North America, to raise awareness of the species's endangered status. She was the first female chair of the Snow Leopard Species Survival Plan, a breeding program designed to help increase the numbers of Snow Leopards in captivity; the species is notoriously difficult to breed in zoos.

Freeman's Snow Leopard Trust began pioneering plans to help people living in areas inhabited by Snow Leopards to improve their standards of living in order to better protect both the leopards and their habitat.

She remained the executive director of the Snow Leopard Trust until 1996 when she took a position on the Trust's board of directors.

A snow leopard that lives in Woodland Park Zoo was named after her.

== Death ==
Freeman died of lung disease in Bellevue, Washington, on September 20, 2007, at the age of 75.
