= Bay Area Puma Project =

Study of mountain lions in California, US

The Bay Area Puma Project is the first major study of pumas (also called mountain lions or cougars) in the south San Francisco Bay Area. Launched in May 2008 in the Santa Cruz Mountains, the study involves nine cats that are being tracked using GPS-accelerometer collars. This project is the first phase of a projected ten-year conservation effort to preserve and protect the Bay Area puma population. The study is being conducted by researchers at the University of California, Santa Cruz in partnership with Felidae Conservation Fund, with coordination from the California Department of Fish and Game and California State Parks.

== Background ==
The puma lives in close proximity to many communities in the San Francisco Bay Area. However, rapid development in the region has caused settled areas to expand into puma territory, resulting in more frequent human–puma encounters, reducing habitat connectivity, and negatively affecting the sustainability of the puma population. Moreover, because pumas are the top predator in the local ecosystem, a decline in the health of the puma population would affect the health of many other species and that of the ecosystem as a whole.

== Research objectives ==
The study is designed to reveal basic facts about the Bay Area's puma population, such as range, density, movement, feeding patterns, and the effects of roads and other human development on the pumas. In addition, a novel feature of the study is the use tracking collars with an accelerometer that records precise data on activity and movement, measuring the acceleration behind each footstep.

== Conservation goals ==
The information gained from this study will help scientists and the public to better understand the role that pumas play in the region's natural ecosystem. The findings will be used as a basis for outreach and education programs that will inform local communities and regional decision-makers regarding puma habitat needs and will also be used to promote healthy ways for humans to co-exist with wild cats.

Specific conservation goals that will be supported by the study include:

- Securing habitat connectivity: The Santa Cruz Mountains are currently almost completely cut off from other ecosystems and are at risk of becoming a habitat island. The California Department of Transportation has asked the researchers to determine the highest priority locations where wildlife overpasses and corridors might be built.
- Minimizing human–wildcat conflict: Reports of encounters between humans and pumas in the Santa Cruz region are increasing. The results of the study will be used by conservation organizations to support outreach programs designed to educate the community about how to live and coexist in puma habitat.
- Preserving puma habitats: As human development increasingly encroaches on puma habitats, the need to secure blocks of habitat for permanent preservation becomes more critical to the survival of the population. A key long-term objective of the study is to identify the geographical areas most essential to the health of the puma population, so that conservation organizations can more effectively raise public awareness and support to influence land use decisions that will have a major impact on the puma population.
