= Lisette Waits =

American ecologist

- Born: Georgia, US

Academic background
- Education: B.S. Genetics, 1991, University of Georgia; PhD, 1996, University of Utah
- Thesis: A comprehensive molecular study of the evolution and genetic variation of bears (1996)

Lisette P. Waits is an American ecologist. She is a Distinguished Professor of Wildlife Resources at the University of Idaho's College of Natural Resources. In 2017, Waits was elected a Fellow of the American Association for the Advancement of Science for her "contributions to research and teaching in conservation genetics, wildlife and conservation biology, and for development of techniques for the non-invasive sampling of DNA."

== Early life and education ==
Waits was born and raised in rural Georgia, where she was inspired to study genetics in high school. She earned her Bachelor of Science degree from the University of Georgia and her PhD from the University of Utah. Waits chose to pursue a career in wildlife genetics after participating in a research project at the Yellowstone National Park.

While earning her PhD, Waits developed non-invasive techniques for gathering samplings of DNA from animals. In 1996, she worked alongside researchers at the University of Alberta to develop a test which could examine carcases of bears and determine their species. The test would help Canadian officials prosecute alleged illegal trading. She also researched the evolutionary relationships between bears and the identification of genetic subpopulations of brown bears.

== Career ==
Upon completing her PhD, Waits joined the faculty at the University of Idaho. In 2017, Waits was elected a Fellow of the American Association for the Advancement of Science for her "contributions to research and teaching in conservation genetics, wildlife and conservation biology, and for development of techniques for the non-invasive sampling of DNA." She also received the Jean'ne M. Shreeve NSF EPSCoR Research Excellence Award from the Idaho National Science Foundation Experimental Program to Stimulate Competitive Research.
