= Carl Safina =

American ecologist and author (born 1955)

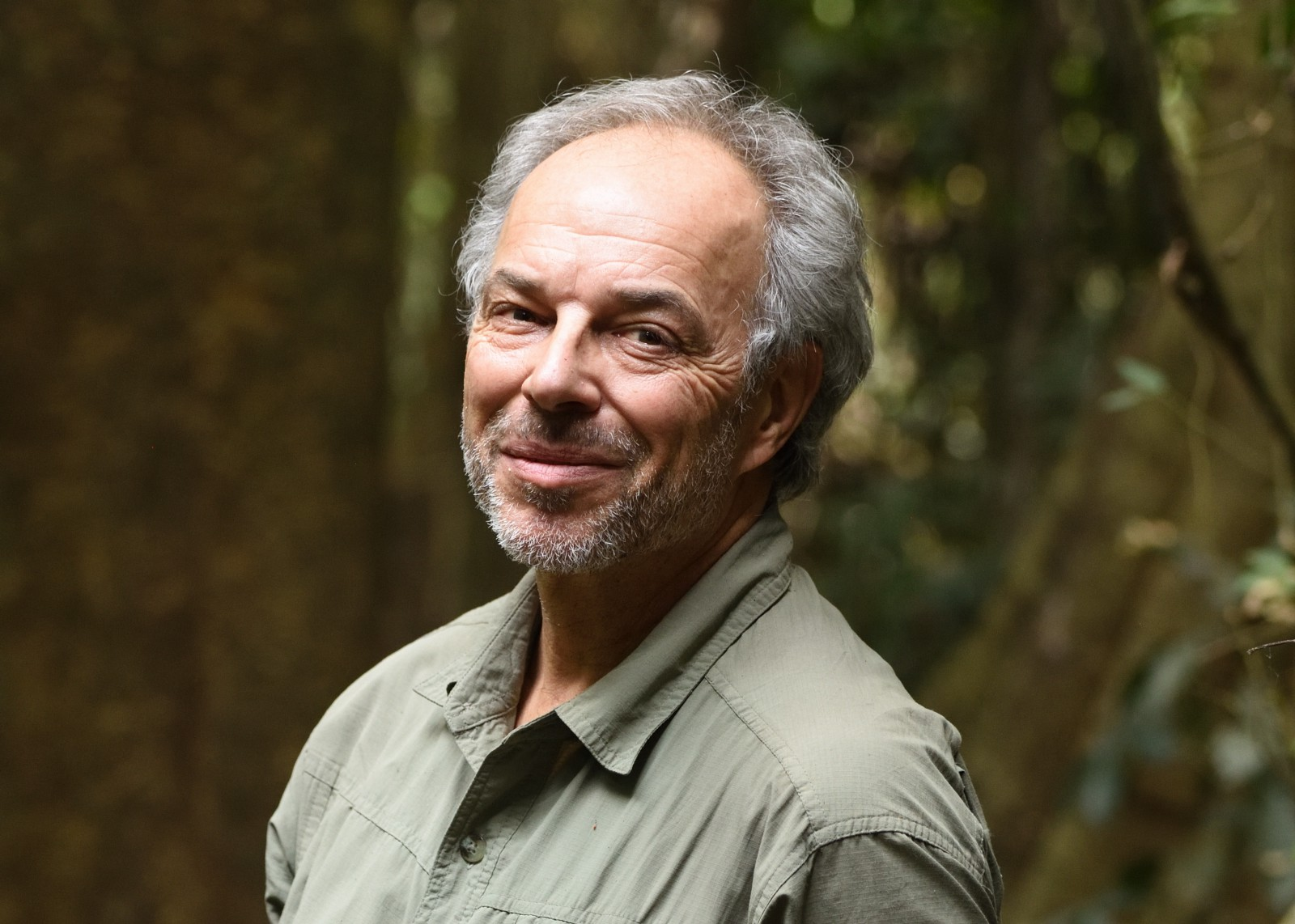
- Born: May 23, 1955 (age 71); Brooklyn, New York, U.S.
- Education: B.A. State University of New York at Purchase; M.S. Rutgers University; Ph.D. Rutgers University
- Occupations: Author, Professor, Founder of SafinaCenter.org
- Spouse: Patricia Paladines
- Writing career
- Language: American English
- Period: 1990–
- Subject: Ecology
- Notable works: Song for the Blue Ocean; Eye of the Albatross; Voyage of the Turtle; Nina Delmar and the Great Whale Rescue; The View from Lazy Point; A Sea in Flames; Beyond Words: What Animals Think and Feel; Becoming Wild; Alfie and Me
- Notable awards: MacArthur Fellowship; Guggenheim Fellowship; Pew Fellowship; John Burroughs Medal; George B. Rabb Conservation Medal; James Beard Medal; Orion Book Award; Lannan Literary Award
- Website: carlsafina.org

Carl Safina (born May 23, 1955) is an American ecologist and author of books and other writings about the human relationship with the natural world. His books include Becoming Wild: How Animal Cultures Raise Families, Create Beauty, and Achieve Peace; Beyond Words: What Animals Think and Feel; Song for the Blue Ocean; Eye of the Albatross; The View From Lazy Point: A Natural Year in an Unnatural World; Alfie and Me; and others. He is the founding president of the Safina Center, and is inaugural holder of the Carl Safina Endowed Chair for Nature and Humanity at Stony Brook University. Safina hosted the PBS series Saving the Ocean with Carl Safina.

== Early life and education ==
Carl Safina was born in Brooklyn, New York to Italian Americans (his grandparents were from Sicily.) At age ten he moved with his family into the new and rapidly expanding suburbs of Long Island, New York. As a teen Safina spent his free hours fishing, camping, and hiking near his home. Rapid building and construction on Long Island caused him to witness the destruction of woodlands and other natural habitats, which made another deep and lasting personal impression.

Safina earned a degree in environmental science at the State University of New York at Purchase. He then attended Rutgers University, where he earned master's and PhD degrees in ecology for his studies of seabirds.

== Career ==
Safina's first book, Song for the Blue Ocean, won the Lannan Literary Award for nonfiction. His second book, Eye of the Albatross, won the John Burroughs Medal and the National Academies' communications award for the year's best book. Safina's Voyage of the Turtle was a New York Times Editors' Choice. In 2011, The View From Lazy Point was a New York Times Editors' Choice, a National Geographic Traveler's book of the month and received the Orion Book Award. Also in 2011, his chronicle of the Deepwater Horizon oil spill, A Sea in Flames, was a New York Times Editors' Choice. His work has been featured in National Geographic,The New York Times, and other publications. He contributed a new foreword to Rachel Carson's seminal work, The Sea Around Us.

Safina is the inaugural holder of the Endowed Chair for Nature and Humanity at Stony Brook University. He has been a visiting fellow at Yale University and a senior fellow with the World Wildlife Fund. Safina is also a MacArthur Fellow, a Guggenheim Fellow, a Pew Fellow in Marine conservation, and a recipient of Chicago's Brookfield Zoo's Rabb Medal. He was named among "100 Notable Conservationists of the 20th Century" by Audubon magazine.

Safina's 10-part television series, Saving the Ocean with Carl Safina, premiered on PBS in April 2011.

== Bibliography ==
- Song for the Blue Ocean: Encounters Along the World's Coasts and Beneath the Seas. Henry Holt and Co. (1998). ISBN 978-0-8050-4671-7
- Eye of the Albatross: Visions of Hope and Survival. Henry Holt and Co. (2002). ISBN 978-0-8050-6228-1
- Voyage of the Turtle: In Pursuit of the Earth's Last Dinosaur. Henry Holt and Co. (2006). ISBN 978-0-8050-7891-6
- Nina Delmar: The Great Whale Rescue Illustrated by Dawn Navarro Ericson. Blue Ocean Institute. (2010). ISBN 978-0-9785417-0-5
- The View from Lazy Point: A Natural Year in an Unnatural World. Henry Holt and Co. (2011). ISBN 978-0-8050-9040-6
- A Sea in Flames: The Deepwater Horizon Oil Blowout. Crown Publishers. (2011). ISBN 978-0-307-88735-1
- Beyond Words: What Animals Think and Feel. Henry Holt and Co. (2015). ISBN 978-0-8050-9888-4
- Beyond Words: What Elephants and Whales Think and Feel. Roaring Brook Press (2019). ISBN 978-1-250-14463-8
- Beyond Words: What Wolves and Dogs Think and Feel. Roaring Brook Press (2020). ISBN 978-1-250-144652
- Becoming Wild: How Animal Cultures Raise Families, Create Beauty, and Achieve Peace. Henry Holt and Co. (2020). ISBN 978-1-250-17333-1
- Learning to be Wild Roaring Brook Press (2023). ISBN 978-1-250-83825-4
- Alfie and Me: What Owls Know, What Humans Believe. W. W. Norton (2023). ISBN 978-1324065463
- Owls in Our Yard! W. Norton (2024). ISBN 978-1-32405319-4
