= Cheetah Preservation Foundation =

South African conservation organisation

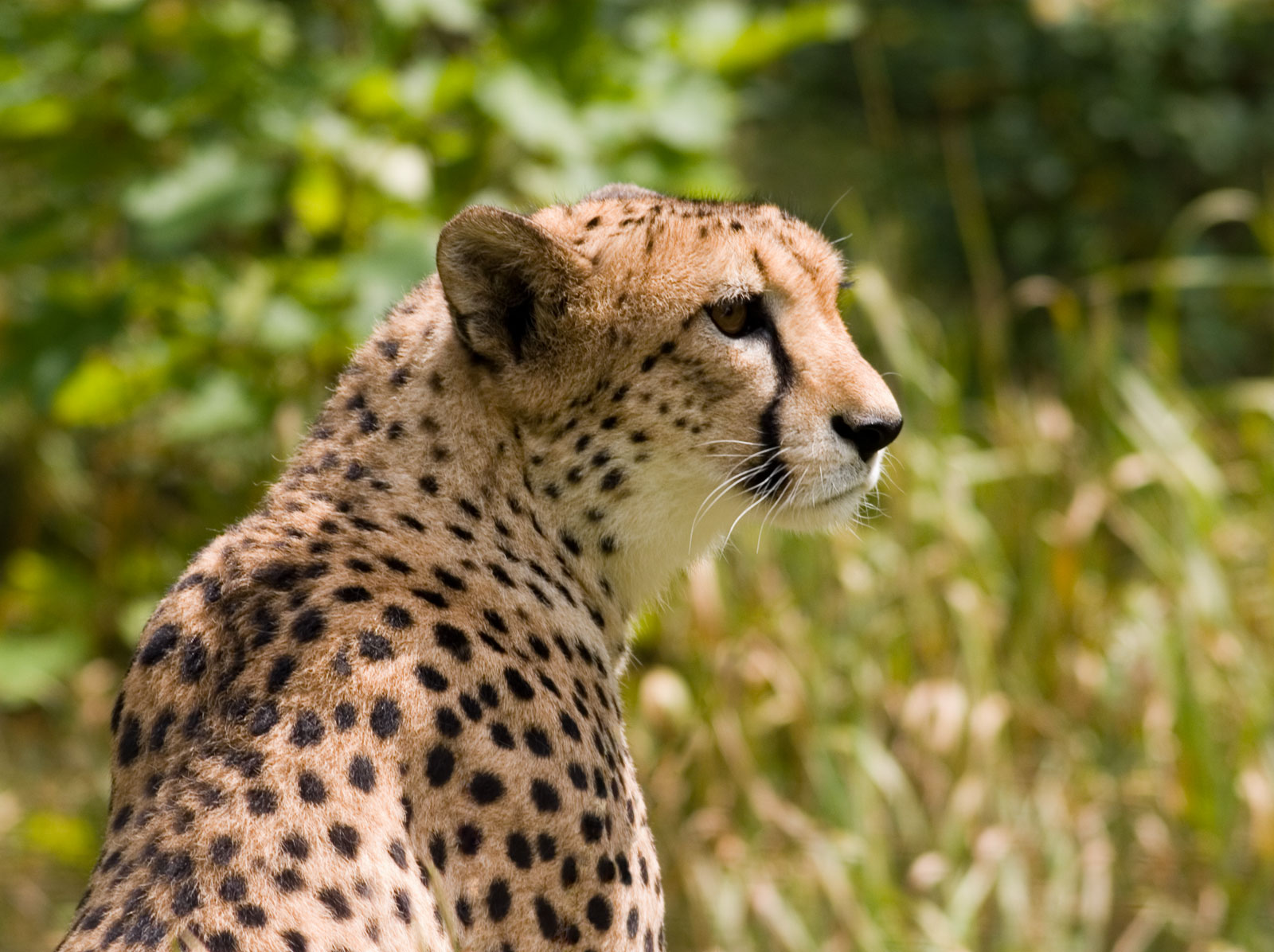
Cheetah

The Cheetah Preservation Foundation is a conservation organisation set up in South Africa in 1993 with special dedication to the protection of the vulnerable South African cheetah. It is one of the largest wildlife organisations in Africa. The foundation has set up a number of programmes throughout South Africa such as the Cango Wildlife Ranch near the town of Oudtshoorn. Visitors are also given the opportunity to become proactive in the conservation of endangered species by joining as members. The Cheetah Preservation Foundation's primary focus is to ensure that all their animals receive the highest standard of medical attention and a carefully calculated, varied diet (species-specific) that is suitable for any human to eat.

== See also ==
- Cheetah
- Asiatic cheetah
- Cheetah Conservation Fund
- African Wildlife Foundation
