= Cheetah Conservation Fund =

Non-profit organisation based in Namibia

Coordinates: 20°29′00″S 17°01′53″E

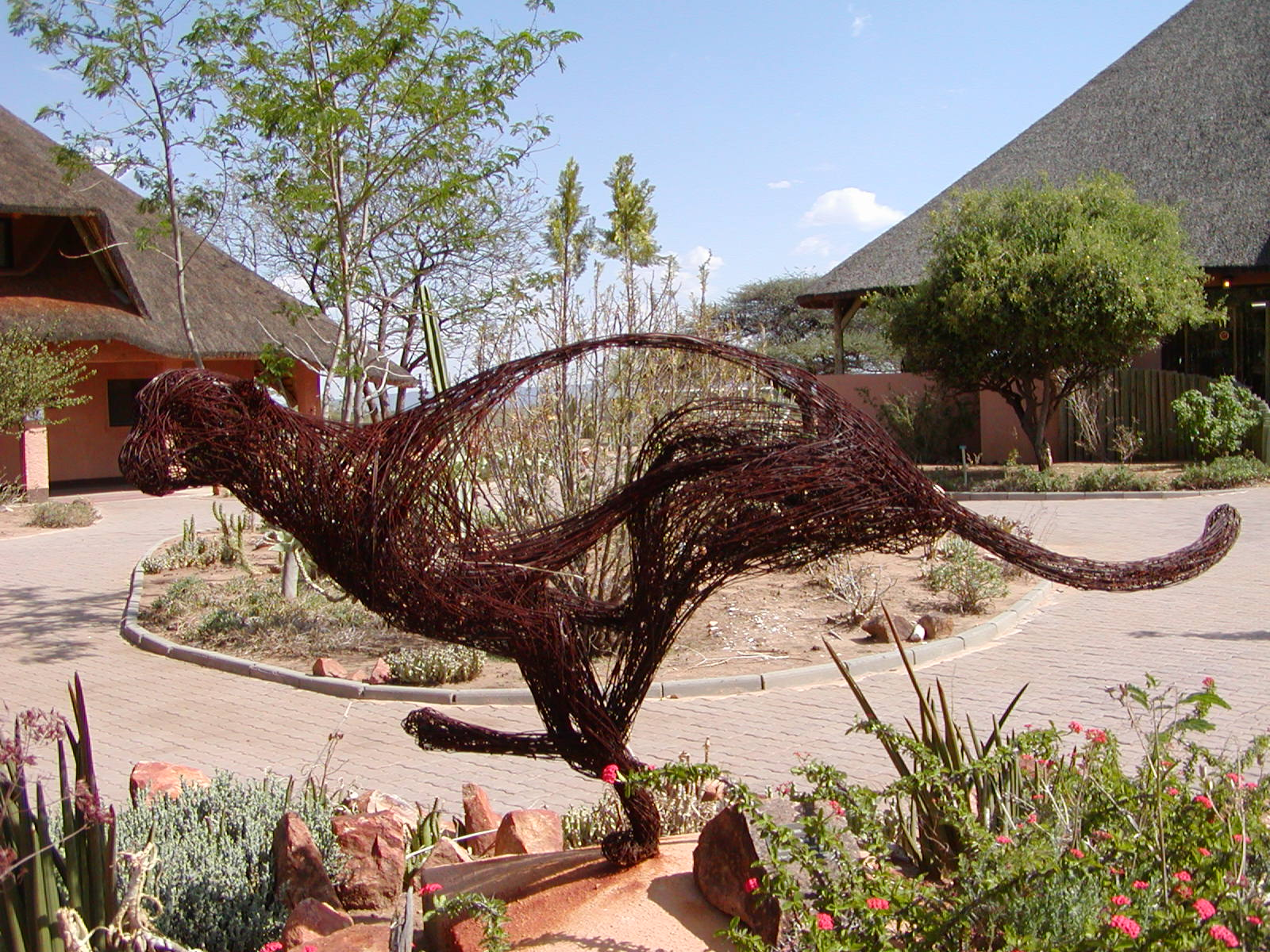
Research and Education Centre, and Cheetah Sculpture by Amy Malouf

The Cheetah Conservation Fund is a research and education institution in Namibia concerned with the study and sustenance of the country's cheetah population, the largest and healthiest in the world. Its Research and Education Centre is located 44 kilometres (27 mi) east of Otjiwarongo. The CCF was founded in 1990 by conservation biologist Laurie Marker who won the 2010 Tyler Prize for her efforts in Namibia.

== Activities ==
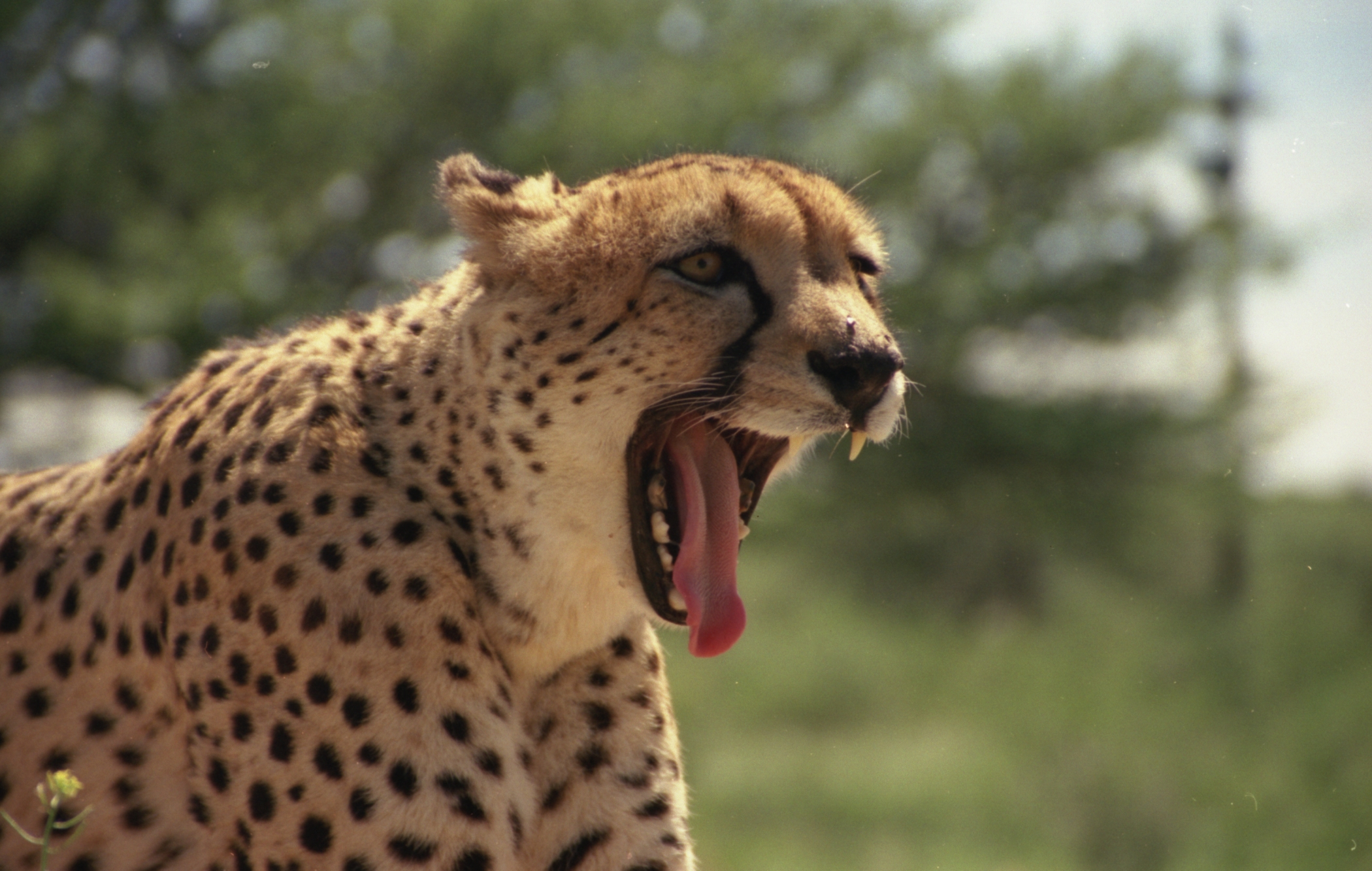
CCF's Ambassador cheetah, Chewbaaka

Loss of habitat, conflict with humans, as well as its own loss of genetic variation, are the main threats facing the cheetah today. Both within Namibia and worldwide there is now far greater awareness of the value of the cheetah within the ecosystem, and its endangered status. Encouragingly, increasing numbers of Namibian farmers (on whose land the majority of wild cheetah live) are implementing predator-friendly livestock management techniques.

CCF's conservation and educational efforts are supported by on-going research used to develop policies and programs to sustain the cheetah population in Namibia and as a model for cheetah conservation programs in other countries such as Botswana, Kenya, South Africa, Algeria and Iran. The CCF further conducts field research in the Waterberg Conservancy (total 2,000 km^{2}) and the Otjiwarongo farming area (15,000 km^{2}).

Eco-friendly BushBlok logs help combat woody plant encroachment, restoring cheetah habitat.

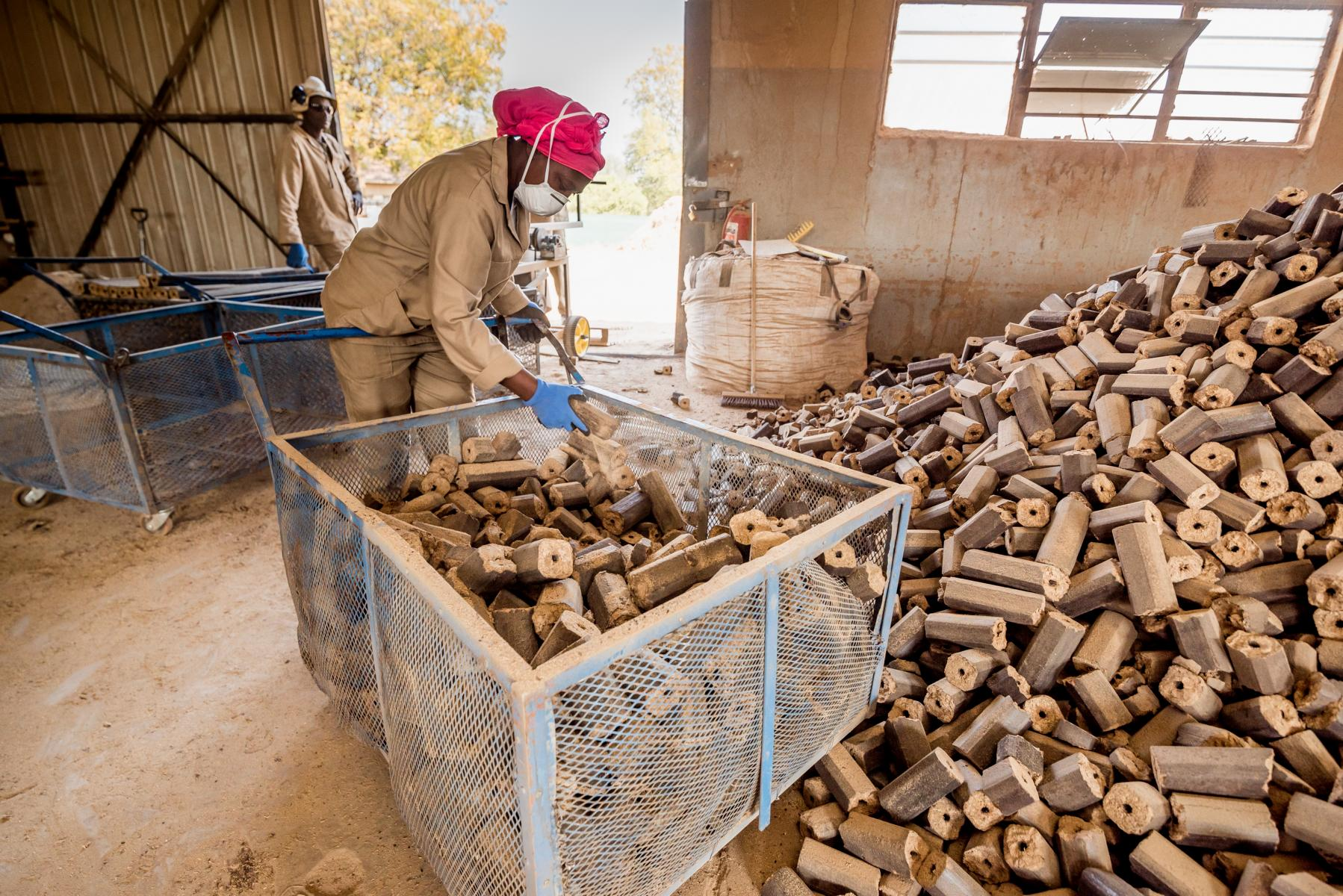
Woman working at the bushblok factory.

This includes a programm on habitat restoration, especially addressing woody plant encroachment. This encompasses testing and monitoring methods of harvesting thickened bush and design a scheme that is appropriate for farmland habitat and is beneficial to the landowners. The CCF also produces the Bushblok, a firelog made from encroacher bush. It also adds to and maintains an extensive physiological database and a Genome Resource Bank.

Kangal Shepherd guarding livestock in Namibia

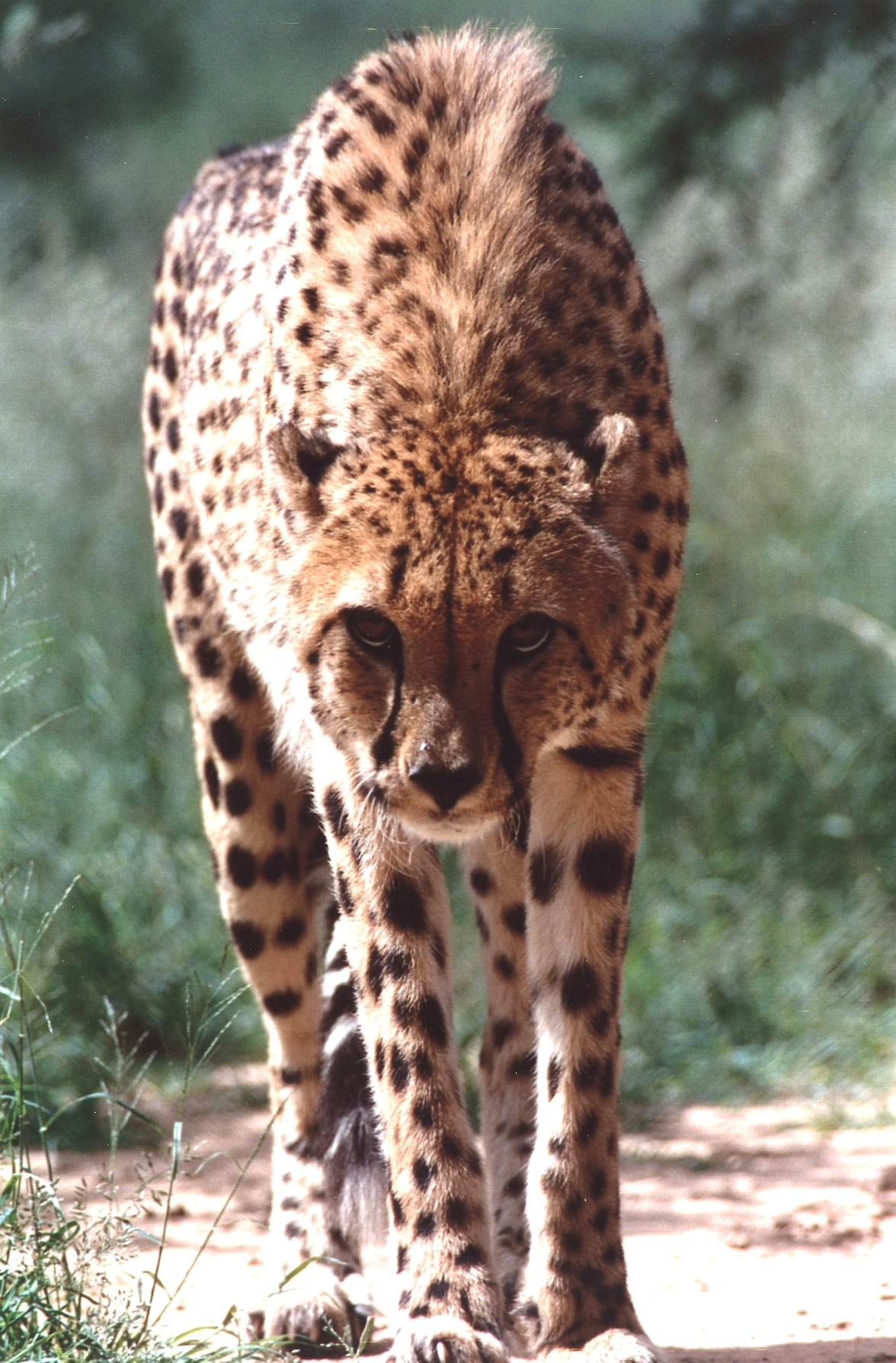
One of the non-releasable orphaned or injured cheetahs at CCF

The CCF also investigates non-lethal predator mitigation to eliminate the need for ranchers to kill cheetah, and issues relating to cheetah in captivity. Aspects of this program include:

- Research on the effective use of swing gates, the relocation of problem cheetahs, and the implementation of predator-friendly farming methods, such as the CCF's Livestock Guarding Dog Program, which has provided an efficient alternative method to reduce livestock losses to cheetahs and other predators. Greater awareness of the program has also led to an increase of requests by farmers who experience livestock predator problems to provide them dogs.
- The creation and management of long-term conservation strategies for the cheetah worldwide.
- Training farmers on sustainability and on how to live with predators, particularly cheetahs.

A threat within the cheetah population is inbreeding in captive cheetahs and the Cheetah Conservation Fund has begun the practice of assisted reproduction including techniques such as artificial insemination, in vitro fertilization, and cryopreservation. Artificial insemination has increased the probability of cheetah impregnation as well as viable offspring. Artificial insemination gives researchers the ability to enhance gene flow between wild cheetahs as well as captive cheetahs, decreasing the negative effects of inbreeding. It also promotes gene flow because this technique allows scientists to breed sexually incompatible cheetahs (zoos). In vitro fertilization makes breeding cheetahs easier because researchers do not have to transport cheetahs from the wild to breed with the cheetahs in captive-breeding programs. Artificial insemination is important for researchers to be able to produce strong offspring from genetically valuable cheetahs. In vitro fertilization also gives researchers the option to temporarily capture female cheetahs to impregnate and raise healthy young and then release after short periods of time. Due to cheetahs' being easily susceptible to certain types of viral and bacterial diseases, cryopreservation, allows scientists to preserve the embryos and gametes of genetically strong cheetahs from the wild and inseminate captive-bred cheetahs, enhancing the allele frequency of specific genes. Cryopreservation is one of the few techniques in which researchers are able to inseminate captive cheetahs with pathogen-free gametes. The preservation of gametes and embryos of cheetahs has given researchers and conservationists the tools to understanding the basic reproductive biology of cheetahs, creating a path for researchers to develop better ways to breed and maintain cheetahs.

== See also ==
- South African cheetah
- Asiatic cheetah
- Anatolian Shepherd Dog
- Cheetah Conservation Foundation
- Wildlife Conservation Network
- African Wildlife Foundation
