= Amanda Vincent =

Marine biologist

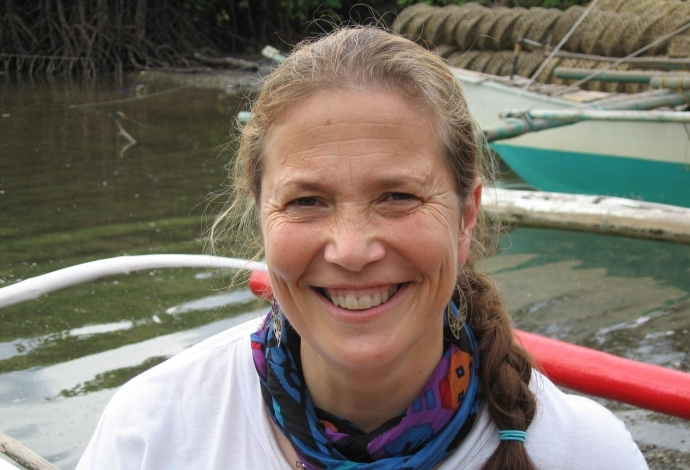
- Education: Cambridge University, University of Western Ontario
- Known for: Seahorse research and conservation Marine conservation
- Awards: Fellow of the Royal Society of Canada (2020) Indianapolis Prize for Animal Conservation (2020) Canada Research Chair in Marine Conservation (2002-2012)
- Scientific career
- Fields: Marine biologist, conservationist
- Workplaces: Project Seahorse; University of British Columbia

Amanda Vincent is a Canadian marine biologist and conservationist, one of the world's leading experts on seahorses and their relatives. She currently holds the chair of the IUCN SSC Seahorse, Pipefish and Seadragon Specialist Group and is the marine representative on the IUCN's International Red List Committee as well as being the chair of its Marine Conservation Committee. She previously held the Canada Research Chair in Marine Conservation at the UBC Institute for the Oceans and Fisheries at the University of British Columbia (UBC), Canada from 2002 to 2012. Vincent co-founded and directs Project Seahorse, an interdisciplinary and international organization committed to conservation and sustainable use of the world's coastal marine ecosystems. In 2020 she became the first marine conservationist to win the world's leading prize for animal conservation, the Indianapolis Prize.

== Education and career ==
Vincent received a B.Sc. (Hons.) from the University of Western Ontario in Canada, and a Ph.D. from the University of Cambridge, England. She was a visiting fellow in Sweden and Germany (1990–1991) and a senior research fellow at the University of Oxford, England (1991–1996). She was a faculty member at McGill University from 1996 to 2002. She held the Canada Research Chair in Marine Conservation at the Fisheries Centre at the University of British Columbia, Canada (2002-2012). She is currently full professor at the Institute for the Oceans and Fisheries, UBC.

== Project Seahorse ==
In 1996, Vincent co-founded Project Seahorse, a marine conservation organization based at UBC, Canada, and Zoological Society of London, UK. Project Seahorse generates cutting-edge research and uses it for highly effective conservation interventions in fisheries, protected areas, trade and policy. Project Seahorse collaborates with researchers, governments, conservation groups, industry, and local communities worldwide to ensure the conservation and sustainable use of the world's coastal marine ecosystems. Vincent remains the director of Project Seahorse as of January, 2024.

== Research ==
Vincent has contributed many scientific papers, technical reports, popular articles, and policy briefings in her field. She published the first monograph on the international trade in seahorses in 1996 and co-authored a book on seahorse identification in 1999. Her work has been featured in media sources globally, including television, and has brought her to over 60 countries.

Her primary research interests include:

- International trade assessments and conservation policy
  - Regulation of trawling and bycatch
  - Trade in marine life for non-food purposes (e.g. medicine, aquarium pets, and curios)
  - Marine protected areas and zoning, including strategies for conservation
- International fisheries management
  - Community-based coastal resource management, particularly in Southeast Asia
  - Small-scale fisheries management, with a particular attention to gender issues
- Seahorses, pipefishes, and pegasid fishes
- The evolution and reproductive ecology of fishes and other marine organisms

Vincent's early work was revolutionary in the field, as she was the first person to conduct underwater studies of seahorses, the first to document extensive seahorse trade, and the first to initiate a seahorse conservation project. Vincent has received many awards and commendations for her work, and has acted as a specialized consultant for marine management guidelines and policy issues in her field.

Vincent currently serves as the chair of the IUCN SSC Seahorse, Pipefish and Seadragon Group, and her expertise has led her to be both the marine representative of the IUCN's International Red List Committee and the chair of its Marine Conservation Committee. From 2000 to 2004, she also chaired the Syngnathid Working Group for the 182-nation Convention on the International Trade in Endangered Species (CITES). Project Seahorse, led by Vincent, also played a pivotal role in the landmark CITES decision to begin regulating international trade in marine fishes. In addition, Vincent has held special responsibility for coastal species as a member of the steering committee of the IUCN Species Survival Commission.

== Selected publications ==
Most Cited Publications:

- Clutton-Brock, T. H., & Vincent, A. C. 1991. Sexual selection and the potential reproductive rates of males and females. Nature, 351(6321), 58-60. https://doi.org/10.1038/351058a0
- Saunders, D. L., Meeuwig, J. J., & Vincent, A. C. 2002. Freshwater protected areas: strategies for conservation. Conservation biology, 16(1), 30-41. https://doi.org/10.1046/j.1523-1739.2002.99562.x
- Foster, S. A., & Vincent, A. C. 2004. Life history and ecology of seahorses: implications for conservation and management. Journal of fish biology, 65(1), 1-61. https://doi.org/10.1111/j.0022-1112.2004.00429.x
- Lourie, S. A., Foster, S. J., Cooper, E. W., & Vincent, A. C. 2004. A guide to the identification of seahorses. Project Seahorse and TRAFFIC North America, 114(1), 1-120. ISBN 0-89164-169-6
- Vincent, A. C., Foster, S. J., & Koldewey, H. J. 2011. Conservation and management of seahorses and other Syngnathidae. Journal of fish biology, 78(6), 1681-1724. https://doi.org/10.1111/j.1095-8649.2011.03003.x
- Vincent, A., Ahnesjö, I., Berglund, A., & Rosenqvist, G. 1992. Pipefishes and seahorses: are they all sex role reversed?. Trends in ecology & evolution, 7(7), 237-241. https://doi.org/10.1016/0169-5347(92)90052-D
- Sadovy, Y. J., & Vincent, A. C. (2002). Ecological Issues and the Trades in Live Reef Fishes. Coral Reef Fishes, 391-420. https://doi.org/10.1016/b978-012615185-5/50023-2

More Recent Publications:

- Monteiro, N., Pinheiro, S., Magalhães, S., Tarroso, P., & Vincent, A. 2023. Predicting the impacts of climate change on the distribution of European syngnathids over the next century. Frontiers in Marine Science, 10, 1138657. https://doi.org/10.3389/fmars.2023.1138657
- Foster, S.J., Justason, T.A., Magera, A., & A.C.J. Vincent. 2022. CITES makes a measurable difference to the trade in live marine fishes: the pioneering case of seahorses. Conservation Biology, 272, 109653. https://doi.org/10.1016/j.biocon.2022.109653
- Pollom, R.A., Ralph, G.M., Pollock, C. M., & A.C.J. Vincent. 2021. Global extinction risk for seahorses, pipefishes and their near relatives (Syngnathiformes). Oryx, 55(4):497-506. https://doi.org/10.1017/S0030605320000782
- Vaidyanathan, T. & A.C.J. Vincent. 2021. Status of India’s seahorse fisheries two decades after it was banned. Biodiversity and Conservation, 30:2223–2253. https://doi.org/10.1007/s10531-021-02188-6.
- Foster, S.J. & A.C.J. Vincent. 2021. Holding governments accountable for their commitments: CITES Review of Significant Trade for a very high-volume taxon. Global Ecology and Conservation, 27:e01572. https://doi.org/10.1016/j.gecco.2021.e01572
- Vaidyanathan, T., Zhang, X., Balakrishnan, R., & A.C.J. Vincent. 2021. Catch and trade bans for seahorses can be negated by non-selective fisheries. Aquatic Conservation: Marine and Freshwater Ecosystems, 31(1):43-59. https://doi.org/10.1002/aqc.3419
- Zhang, X. & A.C.J. Vincent. 2020. China’s policies on bottom trawl fisheries over seven decades (1949–2018). Marine Policy, 119:104062. https://doi.org/10.1016/j.marpol.2020.104256
- Aylesworth, L., Foster, S. J. & A.C.J. Vincent 2020. Realities of offering advice to governments on CITES. Conservation Biology, 34(3):644-653. https://doi.org/10.1111/cobi.13451

Notable First Author Publications:

- Vincent, A.C.J., and J.M. Harris. 2014. Boundless no more. Science 346.6208: 420–421.
- Vincent, A.C.J., Sadovy, Y.J., Fowler, S.L and S. Lieberman. 2013. The role of CITES in the conservation of marine fishes subject to international trade. Fish and Fisheries 15: 563–592. https://doi.org/10.1111/faf.12035
- Vincent, A.C.J., Giles, B.G., Czembor, C.A., Foster, S.F. 2011. Trade in Seahorses and Other Syngnathids in Countries Outside Asia (1998–2001).
- Vincent, A.C.J. 2008. Keynote: Reconciling fisheries with conservation on coral reefs: the world as an onion. Reconciling fisheries with conservation: Fourth World Fisheries Congress. 49:1435–1467.
- Vincent, A.C.J., Meeuwig, J., Pajaro, M., Perante, N. 2007. Characterizing a small-scale, data-poor, artisanal fishery: Seahorses in the central Philippines. Fisheries Research. 86(2-3):207-215. https://doi.org/10.1016/j.fishres.2007.06.006
- Vincent, A.C.J., Marsden, A.D., Sumaila, U.R.. 2007. The role of globalization in creating and addressing seahorse conservation problems. Globalization: Effects on Fisheries Resources. Cambridge University Press. pp. 184–214.
- Vincent, A.C.J. 2006. Live food and non-food fisheries on coral reefs, and their potential for management. Coral Reef Conservation. Cambridge University Press, Cambridge, UK. pp. 183–236.
- Vincent, A.C.J., Sadovy, Y.J. 1998. Reproductive ecology in the conservation and management of fishes. Behavioural Ecology and Conservation Biology pp. 209–245.

All publications by Amanda Vincent (1998-present)

== Awards and honours ==
- Dawkins Prize for Conservation & Animal Welfare (2023)
- Fellow of the Royal Society of Canada (2020 / 2021)
- Winner, Indianapolis Prize for Animal Conservation (2020)
- Le Cren Medal (2018)
- A global finalist for the Indianapolis Prize for Animal Conservation (2010, 2016)
- Yves Rocher Foundation Woman of the Earth (2007)
- Chevron Conservation Award (2005)
- Pew Fellow in Marine Conservation (2000)
- William Dawson Scholar (2000)
- La Presse Personality of the Year (2000)
- Time magazine Leader for the 21st Century (1999)
- Whitley Award in Animal Conservation (1994)
- Rolex Award for Enterprise (1998)
- Grand Prix International pour l'Environment Marin (Conféderation Mondiale des Activités Subaquatiques: 1997)

== Taxon named in her honour ==
- Leptonotus vincentae, is a species of pipefish found in the south-western Atlantic Ocean.
- Hippocampus amandavincentae, is a new species of spiny seahorse.
