= Snow Leopard Conservancy =

International cat conservation organization

- Founded: 2000
- Founder: Dr. Rodney Jackson
- Type: Non-profit organization
- Purpose: Snow leopard conservation
- Location: Sonoma, California
- Region served: Pakistan, Nepal, Tajikistan, Mongolia, Bhutan, Kyrgyzstan, and India
- Key people: Dr. Rodney Jackson (President); Ashleigh Lutz-Nelson (Executive Director); Darla Hillard (Facilitator for the Land of the Snow Leopard Network); Charleen Gavette (Conservation and Education Program Manager); Kayley Bateman (Programs Manager); Shavaun Mara Kidd (Outreach Manager and Conservation Educator); Astrid Stevenson (Office Manager)
- Revenue: $300,000 (2011)
- Website: snowleopardconservancy.org

The Snow Leopard Conservancy (SLC) was founded in 2000 by Dr Rodney Jackson, a leading expert on snow leopards (Panthera uncia) and their habitat. The conservancy works to engage and incorporate local communities in protecting snow leopards in Pakistan, Nepal, Tajikistan, Mongolia, Bhutan, Kyrgyzstan, and India. SLC is a non-profit organization with headquarters in Sonoma, California.

== Programs ==
The Snow Leopard Conservancy works with local people to not only find a way for them to live harmoniously with snow leopards but also to become their guardians. SLC has done this by creating alternative-income projects, such as tourist homestay lodging and eco-tourism. Other means of working with local herding populations is to protect livestock by building predator-proof corrals and providing conservation education and training for children in the Himalayan region.

SLC also conducts research to better understand the behaviors and habitat needs of snow leopards. This is done using remote camera traps, fecal DNA sampling and GPS-satellite collars to study movements and corridor analysis to find areas to target for conservation efforts.

== See also ==
- Wildlife Conservation Network
- Conservation movement
- Environmental movement
- Natural environment
- Sustainability
- Snow Leopard Conservancy India Trust
