= Project Seahorse =

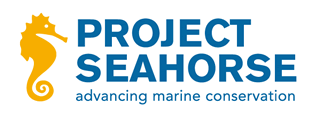
- The Project Seahorse logo
- Founded: 1996
- Founders: Amanda Vincent; Heather Koldewey
- Purpose: Marine conservation
- Location: Vancouver, British Columbia, Canada
- Region served: Worldwide
- Website: projectseahorse.org

Project Seahorse is a marine conservation organization committed to the conservation and sustainable use of coastal marine ecosystems in general, and seahorses in particular. It is based at the Institute for the Oceans and Fisheries (University of British Columbia) in Canada, and Zoological Society of London in the UK.

== Operations ==
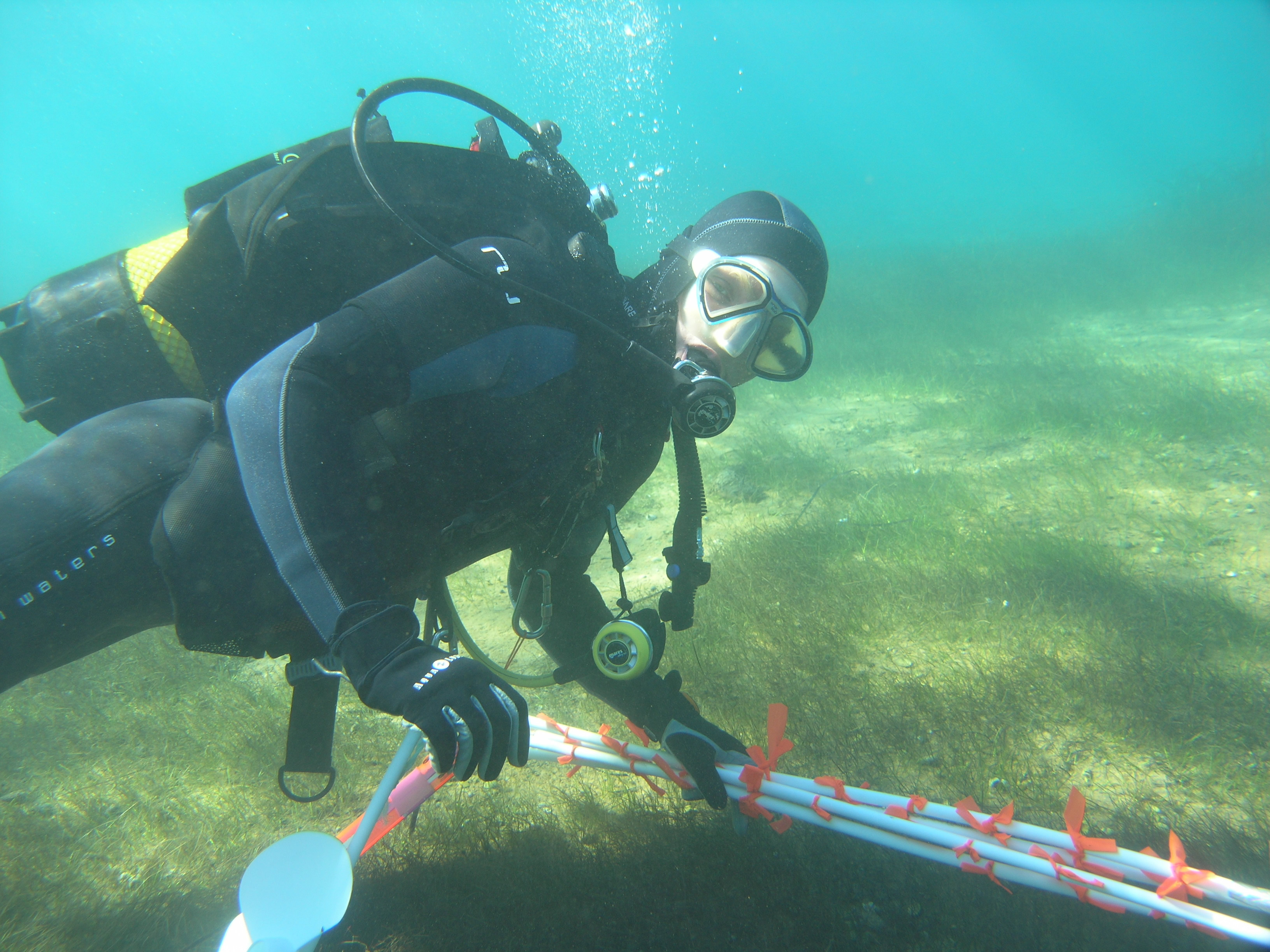
A Project Seahorse Researcher studying a seahorse underwater.

By working to protect seahorses, Project Seahorse supports marine conservation more broadly. These fish are affected by similar environmental and over-fishing pressures as all marine organisms, and benefit from similar conservation measures. The organization's work focuses on not just biological seahorse research, but also on marine fish populations, ecosystems, fishing communities, national and global trade issues, and policy and public outreach.

A small team of scientists and conservationists with offices at UBC, Vancouver, Canada and the Zoological Society of London, UK, Project Seahorse works all over the world, with research and conservation projects in Asia, Europe, Africa, Australia, and the Americas. It was founded in 1996 by the seahorse researchers Amanda Vincent and Heather Koldewey. Today, Vincent is the Director and Koldewey is the Field Conservation Manager. Field work began in the Philippine community of Handumon on Jandayan Island, Bohol in the 1990s, and has expanded to Europe, Central and South America, east and southeast Asia, Africa, and North America. Project Seahorse is recognised as the IUCN Red List authority on seahorses and their related species.

Project Seahorse published a history of its first decade, Project Seahorse at 1] in 2006, and then a 20-year retrospective in 2016.

== Research ==
Researchers study the biology, distribution, ecology, habitat, and population numbers of seahorse species around the world in the context of marine conservation.

Species researched include these:

- Dwarf seahorse
- Great seahorse
- Japanese seahorse
- Lined seahorse
- Pacific seahorse
- Pygmy seahorses
- Slender seahorse
- Spiny seahorse
- West African seahorse

== Achievements ==
- Conservation Achievements
  - Through CITES, generated first global ban on exports of seahorse, in Vietnam (2013);
  - Established 35 locally managed marine protected areas in the Philippines to protect all marine life (1996–present);
  - Motivated Australia to regulate extraction of syngnathids (1998) and New South Wales to protect all syngnathids (2004);
  - Catalyzed the first global export controls for any marine fish of commercial importance, under the CITES (2002);
  - Implemented voluntary code of conduct for seahorse imports (no small ones and no pregnant males), in collaboration with Hong Kong Chinese Medicine Merchants Association (2002);
  - Fostered an alliance of 1,000 families of small-scale fishers, KAMADA, that is leading in the establishment of marine reserves and enforcement against illegal fishing in the Philippines.
- Scientific Achievements
  - First estimates of seahorse growth and survival rates in the wild and making the discovery that many species form long-term monogamous pairs;
  - Uncovered global seahorse fisheries and trade, with tough field surveys and detective work (1993–96);
  - First seahorse identification guide (1999), which has become the core reference for seahorse conservation and management action;
  - First synthesis and analysis of seahorse life history (2004);
  - Produced over 200 primary papers, reports, and policy briefings (1989–present).

== Awards ==
- Association of Zoos and Aquariums Significant Achievement Award for International Conservation for Project Seahorse (2001)
- Grand Prix International pour l’Environment Marin from the Confédération Mondiale des Activités Subaquatiques (1997)
