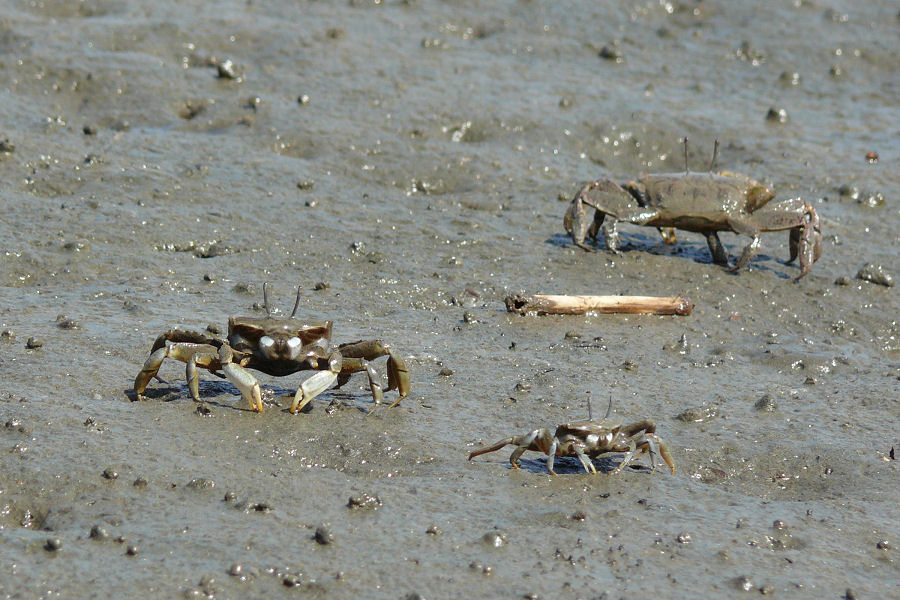
- Macrophthalmus japonicus

Scientific classification
- Kingdom: Animalia
- Phylum: Arthropoda
- Clade: Pancrustacea
- Class: Malacostraca
- Order: Decapoda
- Suborder: Pleocyemata
- Infraorder: Brachyura
- Family: Macrophthalmidae
- Subfamily: Macrophthalminae
- Genus: Macrophthalmus; Desmarest, 1823

Type species
- Goneplax transversus Latreille, 1817

= Macrophthalmus =

Genus of crabs

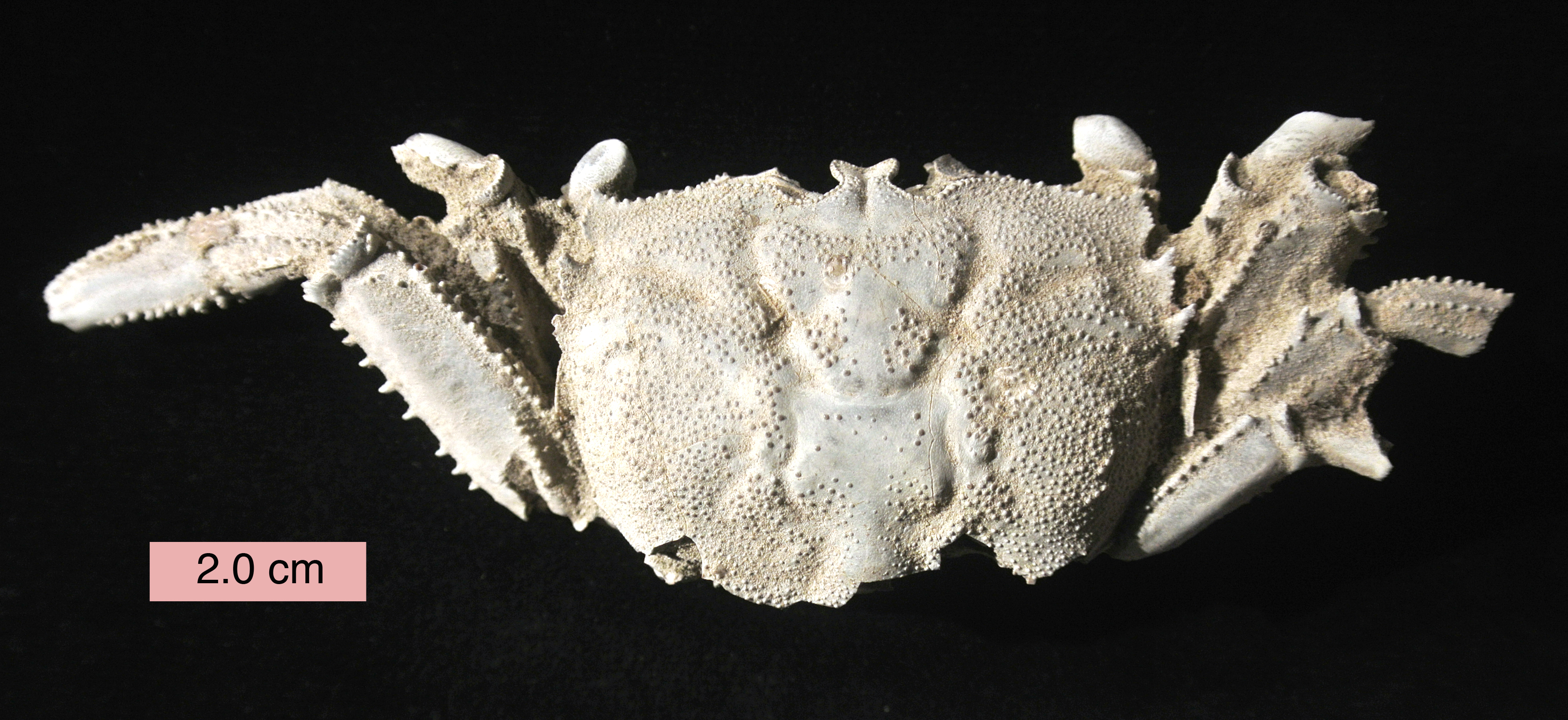
Macrophthalmus latreillei, a Pleistocene sentinel crab from northern Australia.

Macrophthalmus is a genus of crabs which are widespread across the Indo-Pacific. It contains the following species (arranged into subgenera): Species in this genus are often referred to as sentinel crabs.

Subgenus Chaenostoma Stimpson, 1858

- Macrophthalmus boscii Audouin, 1826
- Macrophthalmus dentatus Stimpson, 1858
- Macrophthalmus punctulatus Miers, 1884

Subgenus Euplax H. Milne-Edwards, 1852

- Macrophthalmus leptophthalmus H. Milne-Edwards, 1852
- Macrophthalmus dagohoyi Mendoza & Ng, 2007

Subgenus Hemiplax Heller, 1865

- Macrophthalmus hirtipes (Jacquinot in Hombron & Jacquinot, 1846)

Subgenus Macrophthalmus Desmarest, 1823

- Macrophthalmus abbreviatus Manning & Holthuis, 1981
- Macrophthalmus atambua Nugroho, D. A., & Rahayu, D. L. (2026)
- Macrophthalmus banzai Wada & K. Sakai, 1989
- Macrophthalmus brevis (Herbst, 1804)
- Macrophthalmus ceratophorus Sakai, 1969
- Macrophthalmus consobrinus Nobili, 1906
- Macrophthalmus convexus Stimpson, 1858
- Macrophthalmus crassipes H. Milne-Edwards, 1852
- Macrophthalmus darwinensis Barnes, 1971
- Macrophthalmus gallardoi Serène, 1971
- Macrophthalmus graeffei A. Milne-Edwards, 1873
- Macrophthalmus grandidieri A. Milne-Edwards, 1867
- Macrophthalmus hilgendorfi Tesch, 1915
- Macrophthalmus laevimanus H. Milne-Edwards, 1852
- Macrophthalmus latipes Borradaile, 1902
- Macrophthalmus malaccensis Tweedie, 1937
- Macrophthalmus microfylacas Nagai, Watanabe & Naruse, 2006
- Macrophthalmus milloti Crosnier, 1965
- Macrophthalmus parvimanus Guérin, 1834
- Macrophthalmus philippinensis Serène, 1971
- Macrophthalmus sandakani Rathbun, 1907
- Macrophthalmus serenei Takeda & Komai, 1991
- Macrophthalmus sulcatus H. Milne-Edwards, 1852
- Macrophthalmus telescopicus Owen, 1839
- Macrophthalmus tomentosus Eydoux & Souleyet, 1842
- Macrophthalmus transversus (Latreille, 1817)

Subgenus Mareotis Barnes, 1967

- Macrophthalmus abercrombiei Barnes, 1966
- Macrophthalmus crinitus Rathbun, 1913
- Macrophthalmus definitus Adams & White, 1849
- Macrophthalmus depressus Rüppell, 1830
- Macrophthalmus frequens Tai & Song, 1984
- Macrophthalmus japonicus (De Haan, 1835)
- ?Macrophthalmus laevis A. Milne-Edwards, 1867
- Macrophthalmus pacificus Dana, 1851
- Macrophthalmus teschi Kemp, 1919
- Macrophthalmus tjiljapensis Pretzmann, 1974
- Macrophthalmus tomentosus Eydoux & Souleyet, 1842
- Macrophthalmus setosus H. Milne-Edwards, 1852

Subgenus Paramareotis Komai, Goshima & Murai, 1995

- Macrophthalmus boteltobagoe Sakai, 1939
- Macrophthalmus erato De Man, 1888
- Macrophthalmus holthuisi Serène, 1973
- Macrophthalmus quadratus A. Milne-Edwards, 1873

Subgenus Tasmanoplax Barnes, 1967

- Macrophthalmus latifrons Barnes, 1967

Subgenus Venitus Barnes, 1967

- Macrophthalmus barnesi Serène, 1971
- Macrophthalmus dentipes Lucas in Guérin-Méneville, 1836
- Macrophthalmus gastrodes Kemp, 1915
- Macrophthalmus latreillei (Desmarest, 1822)
- Macrophthalmus leptophthalmus H. Milne-Edwards, 1852
- Macrophthalmus serratus Adams & White, 1849
- Macrophthalmus vietnamensis Serène, 1971
