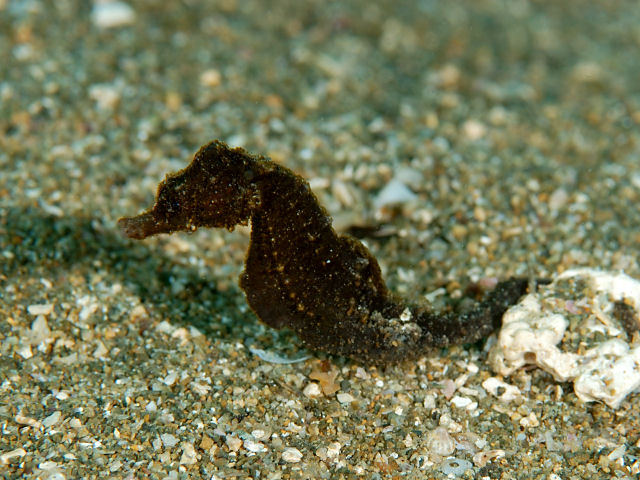

Conservation status
- Vulnerable (IUCN 3.1)
- CITES Appendix II

Scientific classification
- Kingdom: Animalia
- Phylum: Chordata
- Class: Actinopterygii
- Division: Teleostei
- Order: Syngnathiformes
- Family: Syngnathidae
- Genus: Hippocampus
- Species: H. mohnikei

Binomial name
- Hippocampus mohnikei Bleeker, 1854

Synonyms
- Hippocampus japonicus Kaup, 1853

= Japanese seahorse =

Species of fish

The Japanese seahorse (in Japanese, kitano-umi-uma and sangotatsu) or lemur-tail seahorse (Hippocampus mohnikei) is a species of fish in the family Syngnathidae. The Japanese seahorse reaches a maximum length of 8.0 cm, is usually dark brown and has a relatively long tail, a ridgelike coronet and flattened spines. Many seahorse species look similar, so in addition to any distinguishing features, individual specimens are identified using a series of specific measurements and counts of anatomical features such as spines and tail rings.

H. mohnikei has a planktonic stage in the first six months of life, after which they settle, preferably in Zostera sea grass beds or estuaries, and begin to breed. They are ovoviviparous and the males carry the eggs in a brood pouch. While several seahorse species are used in traditional Chinese medicine, H. mohnikei is not one of them.

== Distribution and feeding ==
The mid-range of H. mohnikei distribution is around 28 N latitude. For many years the only confirmed distribution was around Japan. However, it was recently observed as far south as the Palk Bay coast of southeastern India. It has also recently been positively observed in Kampot, Cambodia. It is also suspected to be in the waters around China, Thailand and Vietnam.

They have a planktonic stage during the first six months of life, when they are between the lengths of 15.1–45.5 mm, in which they drift with other plankton in the water column. As they grow their food preferences shift from smaller items such as Oithona davisae and Penilia avirostris to larger food species. After the planktonic stage, they prefer to settle in Zostera sea grass beds and estuaries.

== Identification ==
H. mohnikei reaches a maximum length of 8.0 cm and is usually dark brown all over, but may be mottled. The coronet of H. mohnikei has a low, ridge-like crest. Its spines are low and the body appears laterally flattened. It has double rounded cheek spines and double rounded spines below the eye. Its tail is long in proportion to its body. There is a slight enlargement of the 4th, 7th and sometimes the first trunk rings, as well as a slight enlargement of the 5th, 10th, 14th and sometimes 9th tail rings.

Many seahorse species look similar. If it is not immediately identifiable, specific measurements and counts are used to narrow the possibilities. Following is a table of measurements for H. mohnikei. (If there is a range, it is given in parentheses.)

| Characteristic | Measurement |
|---|---|
| Maximum height of the specimen | 8.0 cm |
| Length of the snout in relation to the length of the head (HL/SnL) | 3.0 (2.8 – 3.9) |
| Number of tail rings | 38 (37–40) |
| Number of trunk rings | 11 |
| Number of cheek spines | 2 rounded |
| Number of eye spines | 2 rounded |
| Number of trunk and tail rings that support the dorsal fin | Trunk 2, Tail 1 |
| Number of dorsal fin rays | 15-16 |
| Number of pectoral fin rays | 13 (12–14) |

Similar species to H. mohnikei include crowned seahorse (H. coronatus, which has 10 trunk rings, an extremely high coronet, and greatly expanded spines bordering a short dorsal fin), Shiho's seahorse (H. sindonis, which has 10 trunk rings, fewer tail rings, and a more prominent coronet), and Korean seahorse (H. haema, which has 10 trunk rings, fewer tail rings, a more prominent coronet, and greatly expanded spines bordering a short dorsal fin).

== Growth and development ==
H. mohnikei have completely developed dorsal, anal, and pectoral fins even as juveniles of 6.0 mm long. Juveniles 6.0–26.4 mm total length also have a tiny caudal fin with just two rays. H. mohnikei reaches maturity at 55 mm and can reach a length of 80 mm. They start breeding in the season after birth, at six months to one year. H. mohnikei is ovoviviparous. The male carries the eggs in a brood pouch, which is found under the tail.
