= Chaenostoma =

Chaenostoma may refer to:

- Chaenostoma (crab), a genus of crabs in the family Macrophthalmidae
- Chaenostoma (plant), a genus of flowering plants in the family Scrophulariaceae
