= Macrophthalmus erato =

Scientific classification
- Domain: Eukaryota
- Kingdom: Animalia
- Phylum: Arthropoda
- Class: Malacostraca
- Order: Decapoda
- Suborder: Pleocyemata
- Infraorder: Brachyura
- Family: Macrophthalmidae
- Genus: Macrophthalmus
- Subgenus: Paramareotis
- Species: M. erato

Binomial name
- Macrophthalmus erato de Man, 1888

Synonyms
- Paramareotis erato

Species of crab

Macrophthalmus erato is a species of crab in the family Macrophthalmidae. It was described by de Man in 1888.
