= Macrophthalmus dentatus =

Scientific classification
- Domain: Eukaryota
- Kingdom: Animalia
- Phylum: Arthropoda
- Class: Malacostraca
- Order: Decapoda
- Suborder: Pleocyemata
- Infraorder: Brachyura
- Family: Macrophthalmidae
- Genus: Macrophthalmus
- Subgenus: Macrophthalmus
- Species: M. dentatus

Binomial name
- Macrophthalmus dentatus Simpson, 1858

Species of crab

Macrophthalmus dentatus is a species of crab in the family Macrophthalmidae. It was described by Simpson in 1858.
