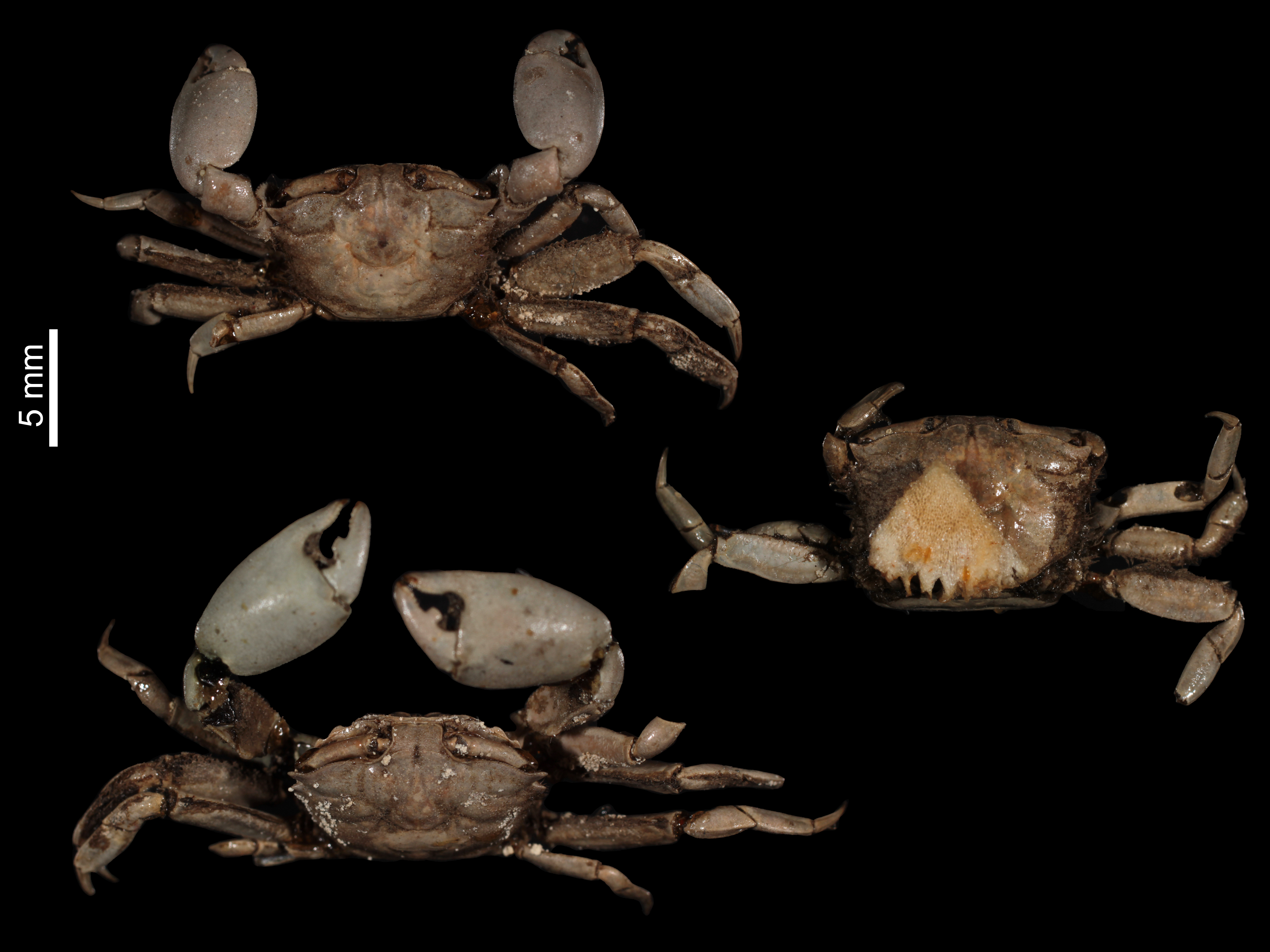

Scientific classification
- Domain: Eukaryota
- Kingdom: Animalia
- Phylum: Arthropoda
- Class: Malacostraca
- Order: Decapoda
- Suborder: Pleocyemata
- Infraorder: Brachyura
- Family: Macrophthalmidae
- Genus: Macrophthalmus
- Subgenus: Paramareotis
- Species: M. quadratus

Binomial name
- Macrophthalmus quadratus A. Milne-Edwards, 1873

Synonyms
- Paramareotis quadratus

= Macrophthalmus quadratus =

Species of crab

Macrophthalmus quadratus is a species of crab in the family Macrophthalmidae. It was described by A. Milne-Edwards in 1873.
