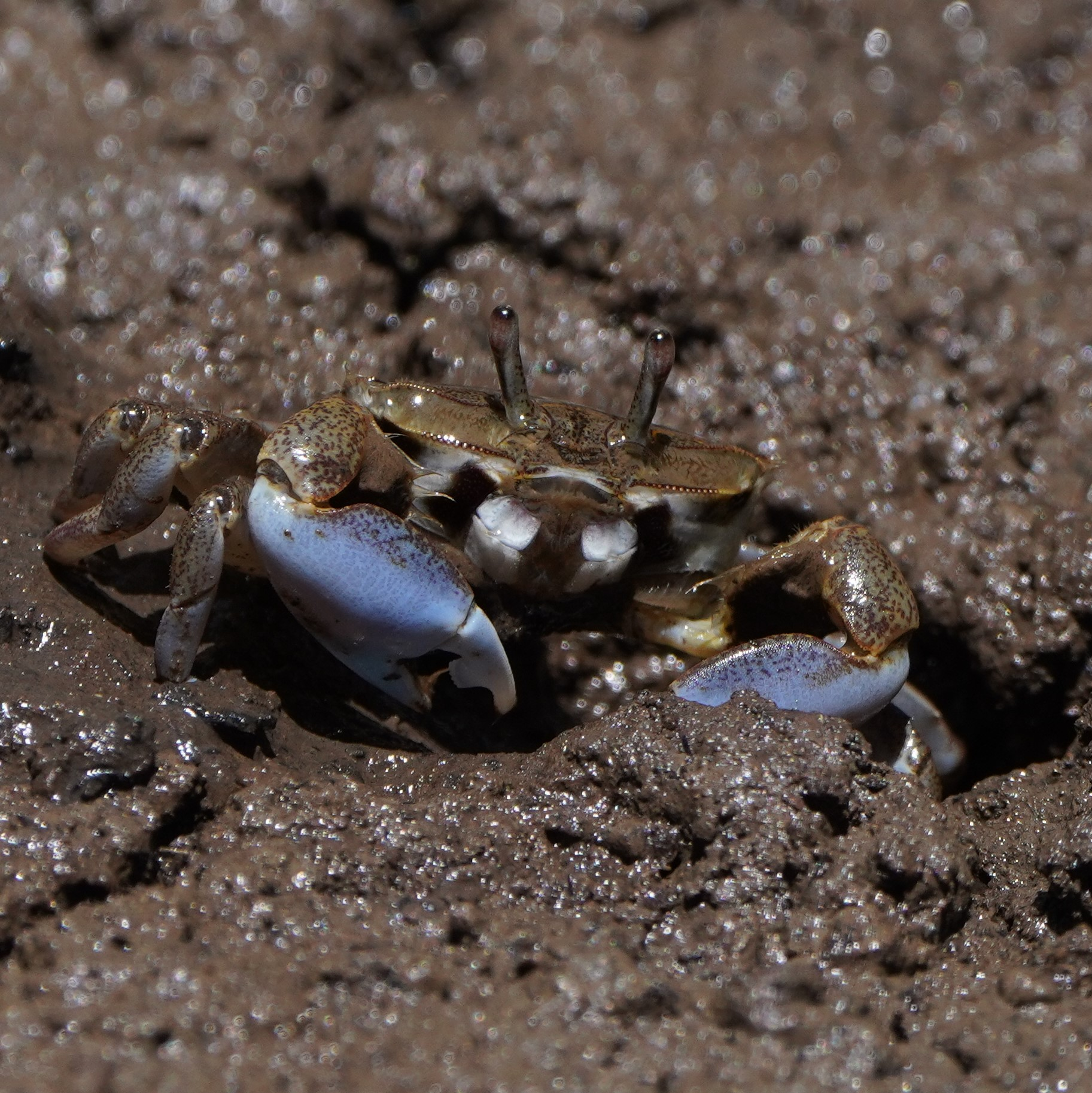

Scientific classification
- Kingdom: Animalia
- Phylum: Arthropoda
- Class: Malacostraca
- Order: Decapoda
- Suborder: Pleocyemata
- Infraorder: Brachyura
- Family: Macrophthalmidae
- Genus: Macrophthalmus
- Subgenus: Mareotis
- Species: M. pacificus

Binomial name
- Macrophthalmus pacificus Dana, 1851

Synonyms
- Macrophthalmus bicarinatus Heller, 1862

= Macrophthalmus pacificus =

Species of sentinel crab

Macrophthalmus pacificus is a species of sentinel crab found widely across the Indo-West Pacific Ocean, including India, Japan, Malaysia, New Guinea, Solomon Islands, and northern Australia.

In Australia it is found in the north from northern New South Wales to around Exmouth in Western Australia. M. pacificus lives in mud in tidal zones of river mouths' adjacent mangrove forests in low tide areas. The claws of adult males are sky blue. It is often found feeding in shallow still water, and in soft mud. The upper claw of males has a tooth on the upper claw (dactyl). Like other Macrophthalmus species, the claws of the male are larger than those of the female. The carapace is smooth and shiny, up to around 25 mm across.

A synonym of Macrophthalmus pacificus is Macrophthalmus bicarinatus.
