= Zostera novazelandica =

Scientific classification
- Kingdom: Plantae
- Clade: Tracheophytes
- Clade: Angiosperms
- Clade: Monocots
- Order: Alismatales
- Family: Zosteraceae
- Genus: Zostera
- Species: Z. novazelandica

Binomial name
- Zostera novazelandica Setch.

Synonyms
- Nanozostera novazelandica (Setch.) Toml. & Posl.; Zostera muelleri subsp. novazelandica (Setch.) S.W.L.Jacobs

Species of aquatic plant

Zostera novazelandica Setchell is a species of seagrass in the family Zosteraceae found on the shores of New Zealand. It is regarded as a distinct species by some authors but considered as a synonym of Zostera muelleri Irmisch ex Ascherson by others. The Maori names for Zostera novazelandica are karepō, nana, rehia, and rimurehia.

== Identification ==
The Zostera novazelandica is a marine flowering plant. The species has long, narrow blade like leaves, and a rhizome root structure submerged below the ground. Zostera novazelandica have elongated, olive-green leaves (50 cm long and 2mm in width) consisting of three longitudinal veins. The species leaf length can reach up to 50 cm long and 0.75 to 1.75mm wide.

Zostera novazelandica have a minimum of two spathes (sheathing bracts enclosing the flower). Each spadix consists of four to eight female and male flowers. The flowers and fruits sit with the leaf blades and are easily located, but inconspicuous and small in size. The flowering shoots have one or more branches, which can have plenty of inflorescence and each inflorescence is surrounded almost completely by a leaf sheath. The monoecious plant produces flowers consisting of petals, stamens, pistols and sepals. The carpels and stamen are compacted tightly within the seagrass flower. Zostera novazelandica consists of less than six carpels and approximately twelve anther-sacs. These reproductive structures slope diagonally inwards and upwards within the flower. The achene, or simple dried fruit, is smooth, yellow, oval and approximately 2.5 x 1.0mm in size. Its seeds are ellipsoidal, brown, and 2mm in length.

== Geographic distribution and habitat ==
=== Natural global range ===
Seagrasses are angiosperms adapted to live in marine environments, particularly coastlines. The genus of Zostera is found worldwide on the coastlines of Australia, south-east Asia, southern Africa and northern hemisphere countries. Until recently the seagrasses of New Zealand was thought to consist of two species; the Zostera capricorni Ascherson (which also occurs in Australia), and the Zostera novazelandica Setchell, which only occurs in New Zealand. It has been investigated that these two separate species are conspecific, or belonging to the same species. This analysis also determined that Zostera muelleri and Zostera mucronata are considered to be conspecific to Zostera capricori Ascherson. Therefore, where this merge of species is accepted, the seagrass can then be found in Northeastern and Southeastern Australia as well as Papua New Guinea, in addition to New Zealand.

=== New Zealand range ===
Where this merge of species is not accepted, the Zostera novazelandica is characterized as a smaller form of the same subspecies of Zostera capricorni, and separate. Therefore, the species can be accepted as strictly endemic to New Zealand. The term endemic defines a species which is native to, or restricted to, a certain place. The species is established on the New Zealand coastlines, from Parengarenga harbour in the North Island, to Stewart Island in the South Island. The New Zealand seagrass establishes in large meadows or small patches in intertidal beds or estuaries. The concentrations of seagrass range between one metre squared to fifteen meters squared. Zostera novazelandica is found at Harwood (Otago Peninsula), Manukau Harbour and Whangaparoa Harbour.

=== Habitat preference ===
The Zostera novazelandica occurs in subtidal and large intertidal zones of New Zealand. The seagrass grows in patches, a discrete, internally homogeneous unit that is closed to its surroundings. The species thrives in locations sheltered from wave action, or where there is entrapment of water at low tide such as reef platforms and tide pools. The species has slight, but not significant, preference for tide pools. The seagrass patches live interspersed among algal beds.

Zostera novazelandica has a minimum light requirement; if the seagrass does not receive 10-20% surface light, it will die. If the species is provided with more light, it will increase the seagrass growth linearly. These species do not favour very deep water. Deep water reduces the amount of light the plant will receive and also increases the hydrostatic pressure on the marine plants. This means that there is increased weight of fluid exerting downward force from above, onto the plant. Zostera novazelandica prefers brackish, slightly saline waters. This is evident in both the increased reproductive and vegetative growth in low salinity waters and its abundance in brackish estuaries. Zostera novazelandica inhabits siltstone platform reefs along the shorelines of New Zealand. The seagrass prefers shallow, soft-sediment environments such as mud or sandy-silt seafloors.

== Phenology ==
Zostera novazalendica experiences a perennial lifecycle, where it lives for two or more years. In the winter the species patch sizes are reduced to their smallest sizes, losing on average 34% of their initial surface area. Winter patch mortality is the highest of the 4 seasons, and new patches are recruited from July to November. Patches are produced by the fragmentation of larger patches, and this occurs mostly in the middle of the winter.

Regrowth of patches then occurs in spring, by elongation at the base of the plant. These patches are formed July to September either by the germination of seeds, which accounts for 40% of new recruits, or by fragmentation, which accounts for 60% of new recruits. This recruitment happens in tide pools or cracks. Once the seedlings are germinated the shoots begin to flower in the spring and immature inflorescence can be observed during late October in all parts of the low and mid tidal zones.

In the summer, flowering shoots begin appearing in patches higher on the shore. Mature embryos and seeds can be seen from late December to March, and seeds overwinter and germinate the following spring. In summer, the sea grasses continue to allocate biomass through elongation of the rhizomes. The seeds that are produced by the plants do not have a large role in the reproduction of the species, year to year. Seed recruitment occurs at very low levels or may even be episodic making the species rely on vegetative growth for survival. Once a patch reaches 0.4 meters squared its chances of survival are enhanced greatly. Leaf surface area is at a maximum in the summer, while rhizome biomass stays constant throughout the year in order for the seagrass to stay firmly planted. November is when the peak recruitment of seedlings occurs, and these seedlings typically disappear by January. The flowering season lasts on average 8 months of the year, from spring to late autumn. Water movement is important for the summer pollination process. Evidence suggests that this species usually flowers only when permanently submerged, due to the requirement of a liquid medium and therefore high shore species have a lower reproductive output when not in permanent pools.

By autumn the seedlings can be found in rock pools and tidal cracks, and flowering is still present.

In some cases the species can become an annual, where the species will be composed entirely of flowering shoots, and the rhizomes do not live through the winter. Annual seagrass' grow during the spring and die out by the end of autumn.

== Diet, prey and predators ==
=== Diet and foraging ===
Zostera novazalendica relies on photosynthesis for "food". The species growth habits are restricted to where it can be provided with sunlight. Photosynthesis is "the process by which green plants and some other organisms use sunlight to synthesize nutrients from carbon dioxide and water." However, the loss of photosynthetic tissue has been proven to not have any significant negative effect on patch expansion. The species can recover from loss of photosynthetic tissue, because a significant portion of its total biomass rests below ground. This biomass acts as a nutrient store and rapidly produces new shoots in response to the loss.

Zostera novazelandica occurs in soft-sediment seafloors, "sandy mud" or rocky platform reefs. Habitable soil depths can range from 34 to 137 mm. Their ideal soil depth conditions are between 60 and 100mm.

Lower salinity waters, produce more flowers compared to higher salinity waters. Salinity influences vegetative proliferation of seagrass.

=== Predators, parasites and diseases ===
The species that most affects Zostera novazalendica is Macrophthalmus hirtipes. It is a small endemic crab, which burrows in 63% of patches on average and feeds on the blades, basal sheaths, rhizomes and roots. Macrophthalmus hirtipes relies on the Zostera novazalendica for 30% to 50% of its diet, while the rest of its diet consists of invertebrates. The crabs also deteriorate the patch edges and accelerate erosion by burrowing around the edges, consequently reducing binding of seagrass roots and causing soil loss.

The species is also affected by a disease called the wasting disease. The disease deteriorates the leaf blades of the plant. The overall effect is that the blades are drastically reduced and patches are more vulnerable to possible invasion of crabs, which would result in severe erosion of the plant. However, the patches often recovers well with the growth of new blades.

The decline in the New Zealand seagrass species is not only due to natural causes including predation and parasitism, but instead by anthropogenic stressors such as eutrophication, climate change and aquaculture. These threats include residential and commercial development on shores and pollution, such as agriculture and forestry leaving liquid waste and increasing nutrient loads. Increased water temperatures have led to the species creating more flowers due to increased stress, and therefore the species wastes its stored energy.

== Other information ==
=== Uses ===
The Zostera species was used as a food source, a substitute for manufacturing paper and mattress stuffing. The New Zealand seagrass was significant to indigenous Maori, as it was important in food preparation and clothing embellishment.

=== Historical accounts ===
It is believed that there were widespread meadows of Zostera novazelandica in the 19th century, because of the historical accounts made by European naturalists. For example, Leonard Cockayne (1855-1934) explained that the seagrass was "extremely common in shallow estuaries" and that it "covers the muddy floor...for many square yards at a time."

=== Importance of seagrass ===
The reduction of seagrass is associated with the decline of both black swans and fish catches. As primary producers, they are needed to create organic form through photosynthesis using carbon dioxide and sunlight. They are large suppliers of resources in the food web. The seagrass are seabed stabilizers that promote biodiversity. Many young fish rely on the seagrass as nurseries to grow within during their juvenile months. For example, the New Zealand snapper, an important large fish for commercial and recreational purposes, relies on seagrass such as Zostera novazelandica as a nursery for the first year of their lives.

=== Lack of research ===
There is very little known about this species except for a select few of individuals who have undergone research. Researchers have recently discovered the extent of the species resilience to disturbance. This may be a major factor in its management of human disturbance.
