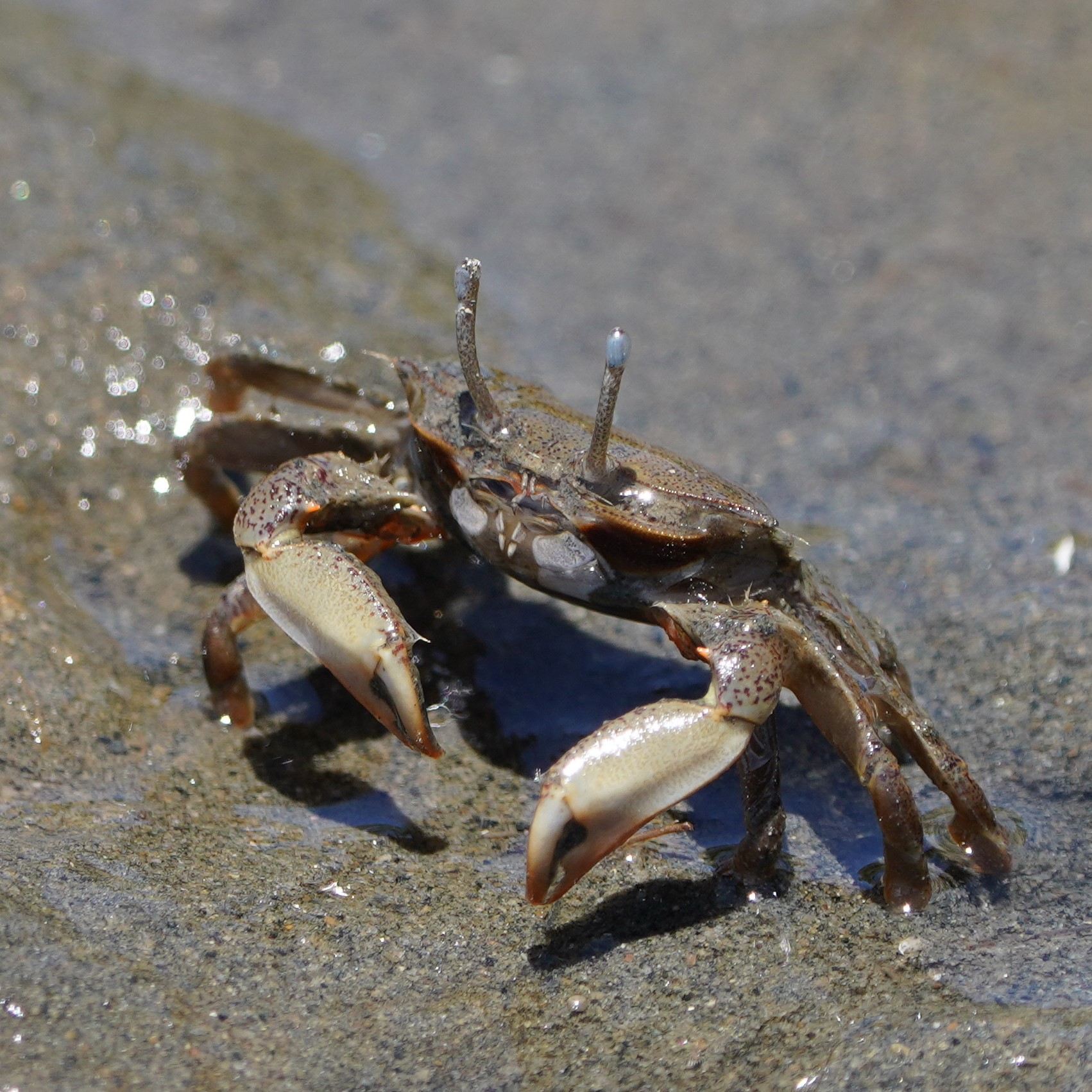
- On Nudgee Beach, Queensland

Scientific classification
- Kingdom: Animalia
- Phylum: Arthropoda
- Class: Malacostraca
- Order: Decapoda
- Suborder: Pleocyemata
- Infraorder: Brachyura
- Family: Macrophthalmidae
- Genus: Macrophthalmus
- Subgenus: Macrophthalmus
- Species: M. crassipes

Binomial name
- Macrophthalmus crassipes (Milne Edwards, 1852)

= Macrophthalmus crassipes =

Seagrass sentinel crab

Species of crab

Macrophthalmus crassipes is a species of sentinel crab in the family Macrophthalmidae, found around China, Thailand, Malaysia, Australia, and the Caroline Islands. In Australia it is found from north Western Australia through to New South Wales. Common names include the seagrass sentinel crab and the orange spined sentinel crab. On adult males there is a substantial tooth on the lower claw and a much smaller tooth on the upper claw, and noticeable orange spines on the “wrist” (carpus) of the clawed leg and on the palm of the clawed leg. The carapace is covered in small granules, and is up to around 37 mm (1.5 in) across. It is a burrowing crab, and lives in open tidal flats, muddy or with sandy mud, low on tidal creek banks, and adjacent mangroves.
