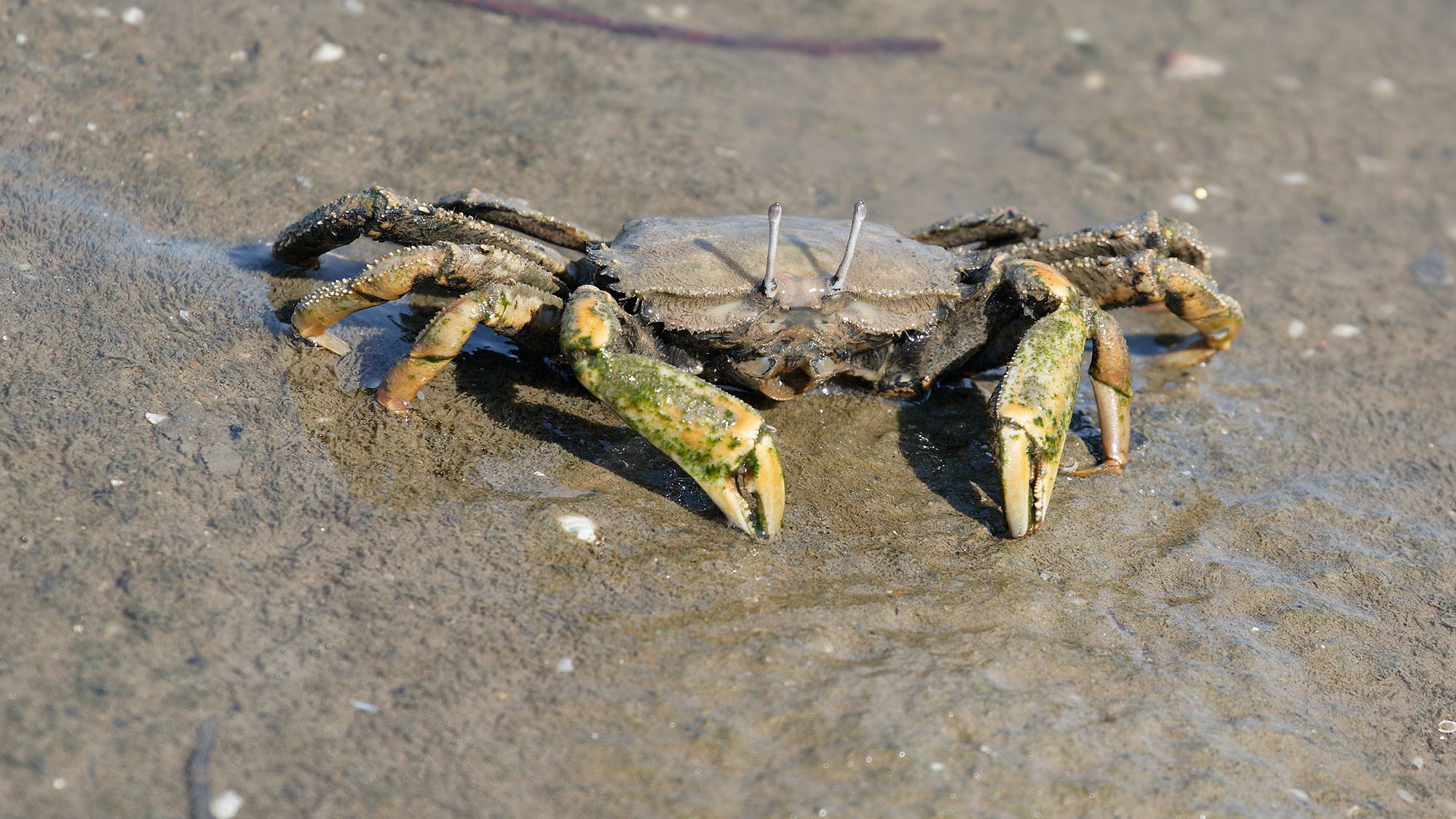

Scientific classification
- Kingdom: Animalia
- Phylum: Arthropoda
- Class: Malacostraca
- Order: Decapoda
- Suborder: Pleocyemata
- Infraorder: Brachyura
- Family: Macrophthalmidae
- Genus: Venitus
- Species: V. latreillei

Binomial name
- Venitus latreillei (Desmarest, 1822)

Synonyms
- Macrophthalmus latreillei

= Venitus latreillei =

Species of crustaceans

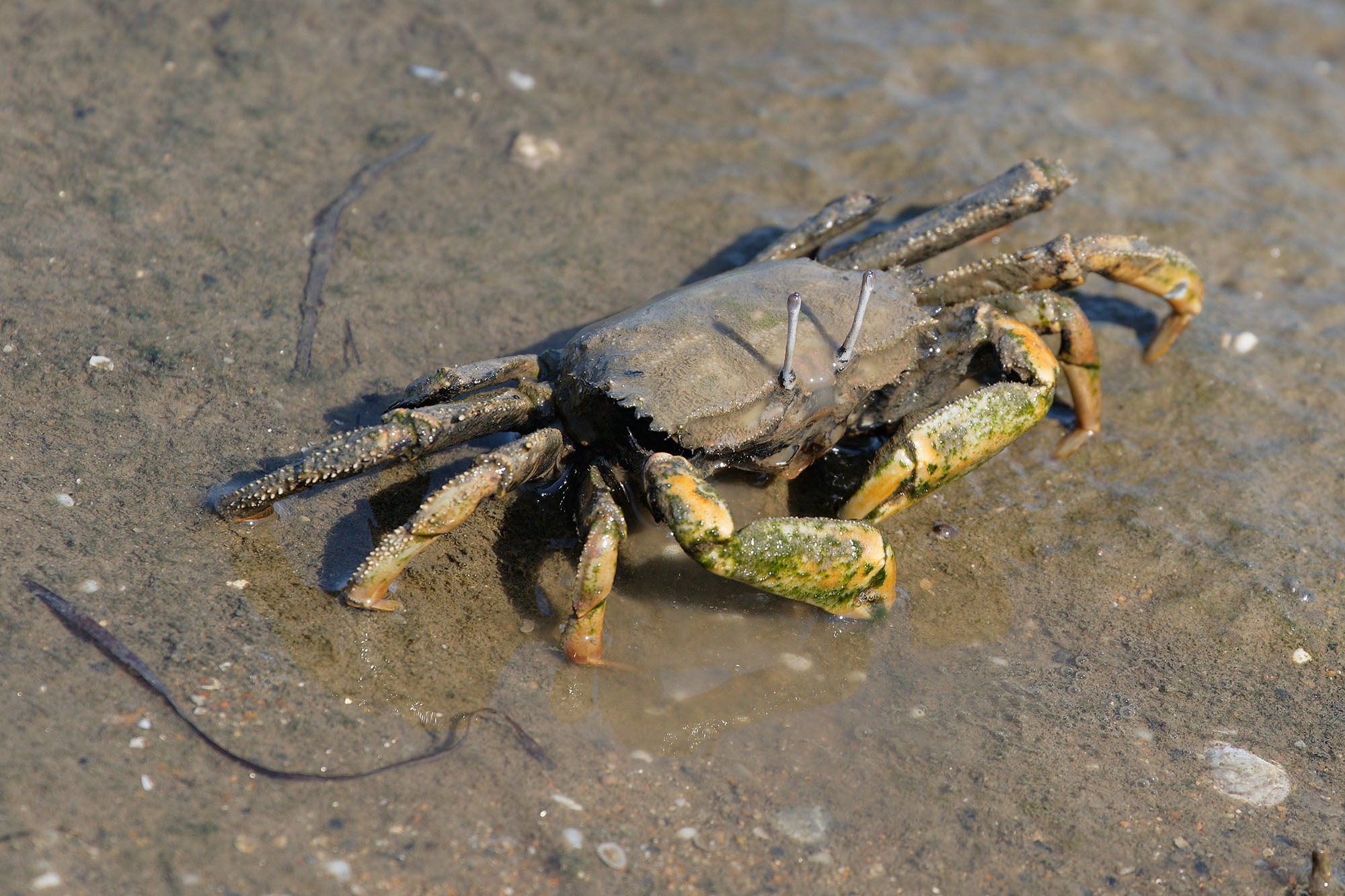
Venitus latreillei

Venitus latreillei, commonly known as the giant sentinel crab, is a species of crab in the family Macrophthalmidae, sub family Macrophthalminae. It is a large sentinel crab, carapace width recorded as up to 60 mm across. It lives in the intertidal zone of the Indo-West Pacific Ocean, including South Africa, Japan, the Philippines, New Caledonia and Northern Australia, south to Moreton Bay on the east coast, to Fremantle on the west, in burrows in the intertidal zone in very soft mud. The carapace is granular, with three distinct teeth on the side, occasionally a fourth smaller one. The claws of adult males have a large serrated tooth on the upper claw. They feed on detritus (organic matter), and very small worms. Their burrow entries are rectangular or oval shaped rather than circular.
