= Macrophthalmus boteltobagoe =

Scientific classification
- Domain: Eukaryota
- Kingdom: Animalia
- Phylum: Arthropoda
- Class: Malacostraca
- Order: Decapoda
- Suborder: Pleocyemata
- Infraorder: Brachyura
- Family: Macrophthalmidae
- Genus: Macrophthalmus
- Subgenus: Paramareotis
- Species: M. boteltobagoe

Binomial name
- Macrophthalmus boteltobagoe Sakai, 1939

Synonyms
- Paramareotis boteltobagoe

Species of crab

Macrophthalmus boteltobagoe is a species of crab in the family Macrophthalmidae. It was described by Sakai in 1939.
