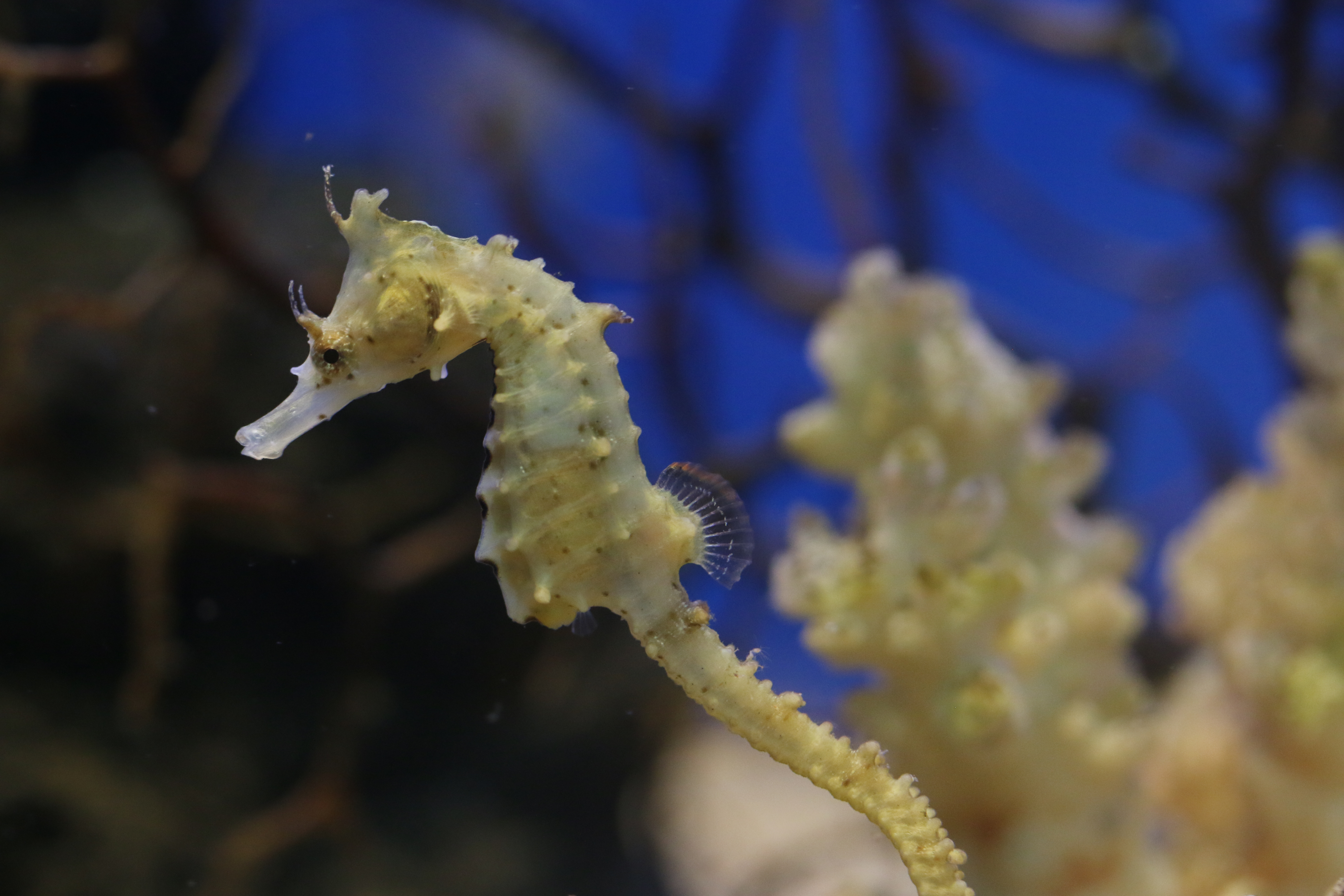

Conservation status
- CITES Appendix II (CITES)

Scientific classification
- Domain: Eukaryota
- Kingdom: Animalia
- Phylum: Chordata
- Class: Actinopterygii
- Order: Syngnathiformes
- Family: Syngnathidae
- Genus: Hippocampus
- Species: H. haema

Binomial name
- Hippocampus haema Han, Kim, Kai & Senou, 2017

= Hippocampus haema =

Species of fish

Hippocampus haema, the Korean seahorse, is a seahorse of the family Syngnathidae native to the northern Pacific Ocean (Korea Strait, Sea of Japan, northeastern coast of Honshu), and it usually lives in Sargassum and weeds on shallow soft bottom habitats from 0 to 18 m depth. The Korean seahorse is the most common seahorse in Korean waters so that the scientific name 'haema' is named from 'seahorse' in Korean. The Japanese name 'Himetatsu' is derived from its smaller shape such as body and coronet rather than the shape of a sister species, crowned seahorse (Hippocampus coronatus). This species had been repeatedly misidentified as crowned seahorse and Shiho's seahorse before a taxonomic review. However, the two genuine species do not live in Korean waters, therefore this species was handled by naming a new scientific name, Hippocampus haema. It can grow to lengths of 11 centimeters, but more commonly 6 to 8 centimeters as adult. Namely, the length of juvenile is 1 to 5 centimeters, whereas and the lengths of males and females reaching sexual maturity are considered as ca. 5 centimeters with or without male brood pouch. However, sex determination of this species is considered as ca. 2 centimeters from anatomic examination of gonad. This species has sexual dimorphism, the difference is male has a longer tail, while female has a longer trunk for same size. Breeding season of this species is from April to October or May to November (7 months), relating to warm water temperature. The number of fertilized egg or larvae inside the male brood pouch were 38.3±14.8 (20-76), and the number of fecundity identified from female were 47.2±8.6 (31-59). The female-to-male ratio was 1:1.7, indicating the dominance of males.

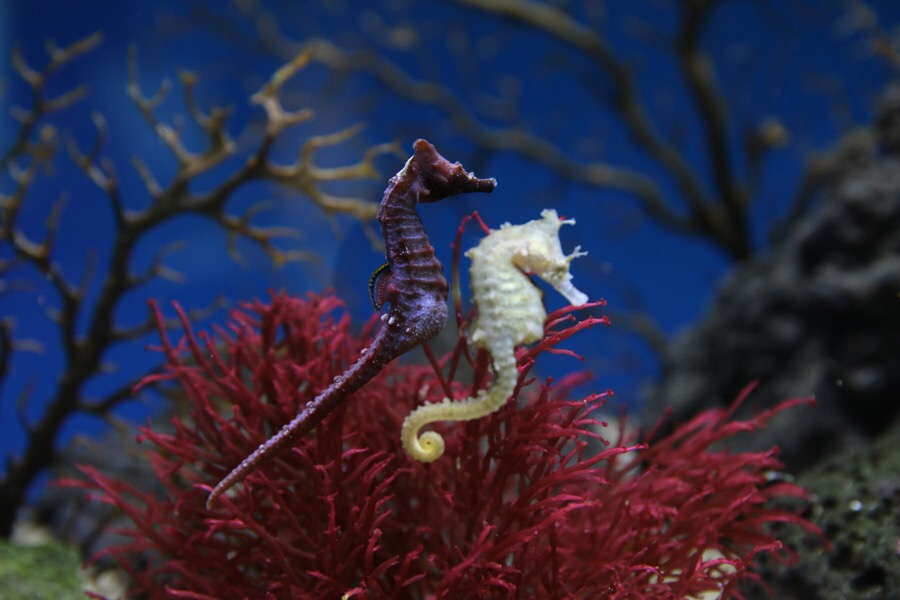
Male (left) and female (right) Hippocampus haema

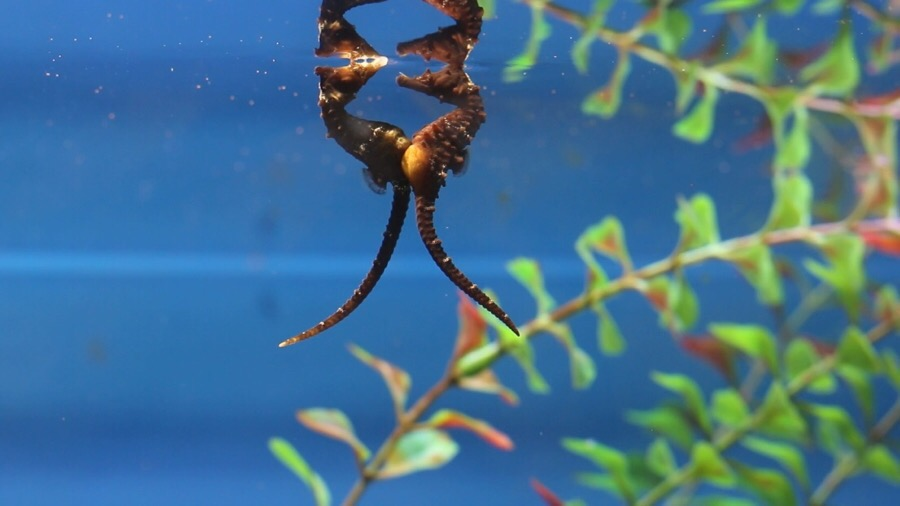
Mating behaviour of Hippocampus haema

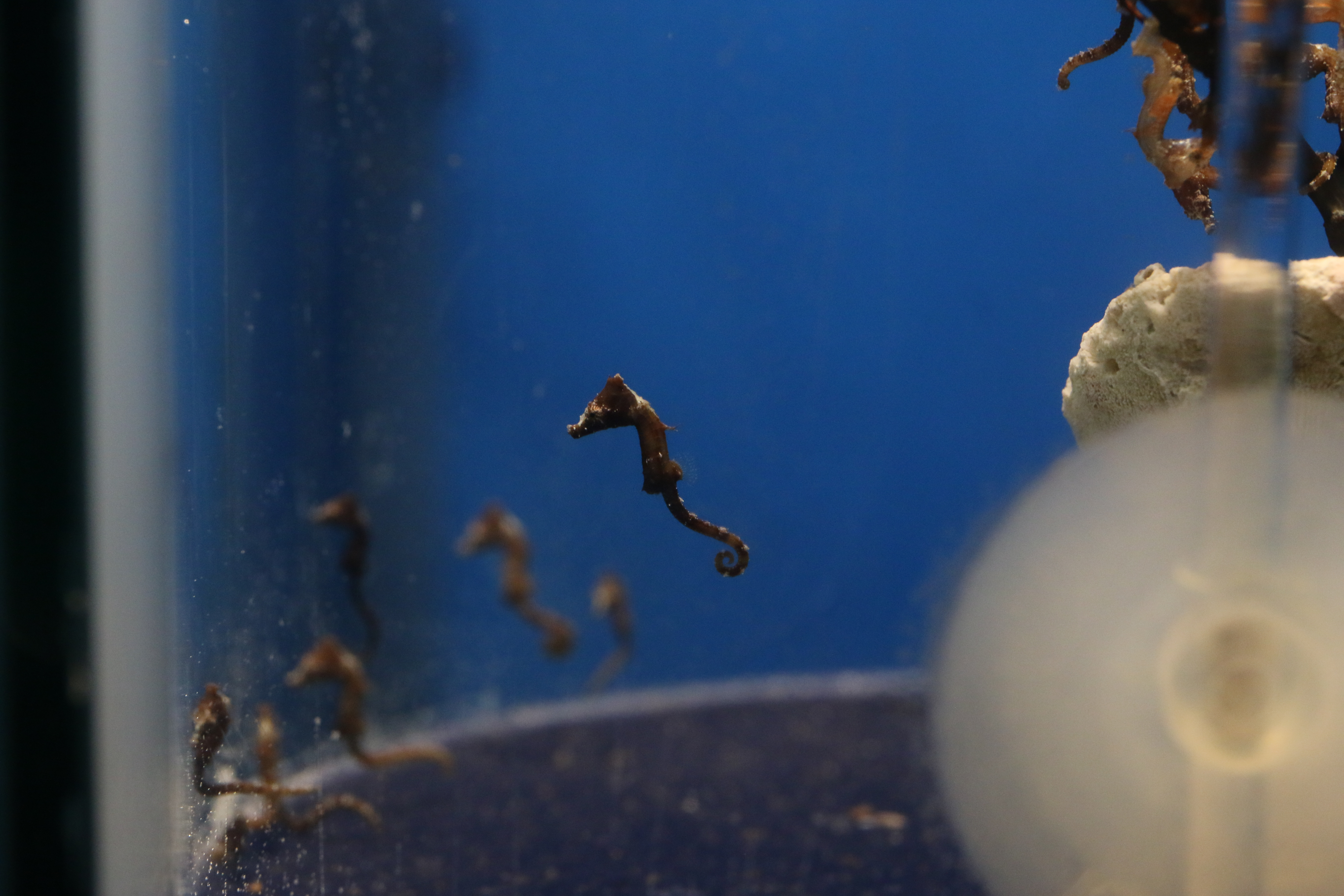
Juvenile Hippocampus haema
