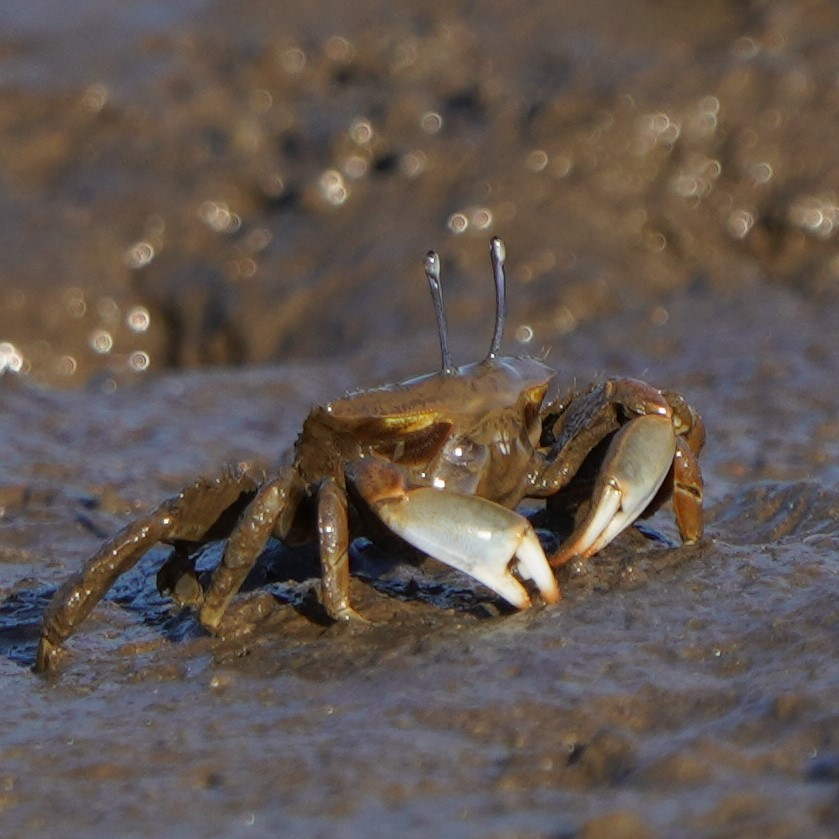

Scientific classification
- Domain: Eukaryota
- Kingdom: Animalia
- Phylum: Arthropoda
- Class: Malacostraca
- Order: Decapoda
- Suborder: Pleocyemata
- Infraorder: Brachyura
- Family: Macrophthalmidae
- Genus: Macrophthalmus
- Subgenus: Mareotis
- Species: M. setosus

Binomial name
- Macrophthalmus setosus H. Milne Edwards, 1852

= Macrophthalmus setosus =

Australian sentinel crab

Species of sentinel crab

Macrophthalmus setosus is a species of sentinel crab found on the east coast of Australia, from around Queensland to Sydney. Macrophthalmus setosus is found low down on muddy river and creek banks and in exposed sea grass areas in tidal zones, at times near mangroves. Males have a tooth on the upper claw (dactyl). The carapace is around 40 mm wide, and rectangular, greater than 1.7 times wide than long. Eye stalks are long and thin.
