= Macrophthalmus holthuisi =

Scientific classification
- Domain: Eukaryota
- Kingdom: Animalia
- Phylum: Arthropoda
- Class: Malacostraca
- Order: Decapoda
- Suborder: Pleocyemata
- Infraorder: Brachyura
- Family: Macrophthalmidae
- Genus: Macrophthalmus
- Subgenus: Paramareotis
- Species: M. holthuisi

Binomial name
- Macrophthalmus holthuisi Sèrene, 1973

Synonyms
- Paramareotis holthuisi

Species of crab

Macrophthalmus holthuisi is a species of crab in the family Macrophthalmidae. It was described by Sèrene in 1973.
