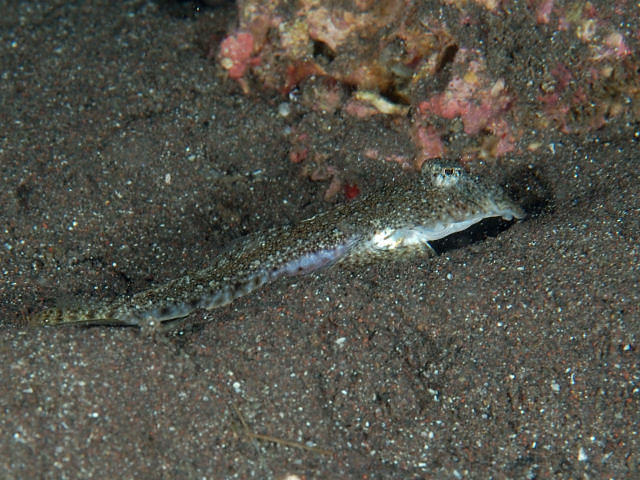

Scientific classification
- Kingdom: Animalia
- Phylum: Chordata
- Class: Actinopterygii
- Division: Teleostei
- Order: Syngnathiformes
- Family: Callionymidae
- Genus: Pseudocalliurichthys; Nakabo, 1982
- Species: P. variegatus

Binomial name
- Pseudocalliurichthys variegatus (Temminck & Schlegel, 1845)

Synonyms
- Callionymus variegatus Temminck & Schlegel, 1845

= Pseudocalliurichthys =

Species of fish

Pseudocalliurichthys variegatus, the variegated ruddertail dragonet , is a species of dragonet native to the western Pacific off southern Japan where it can be found in beds of Zostera sea grass, on sandy sea beds and among reef rubble. This species grows to a length of 10 centimetres (3.9 in) SL. This species is the only known member of its genus.
