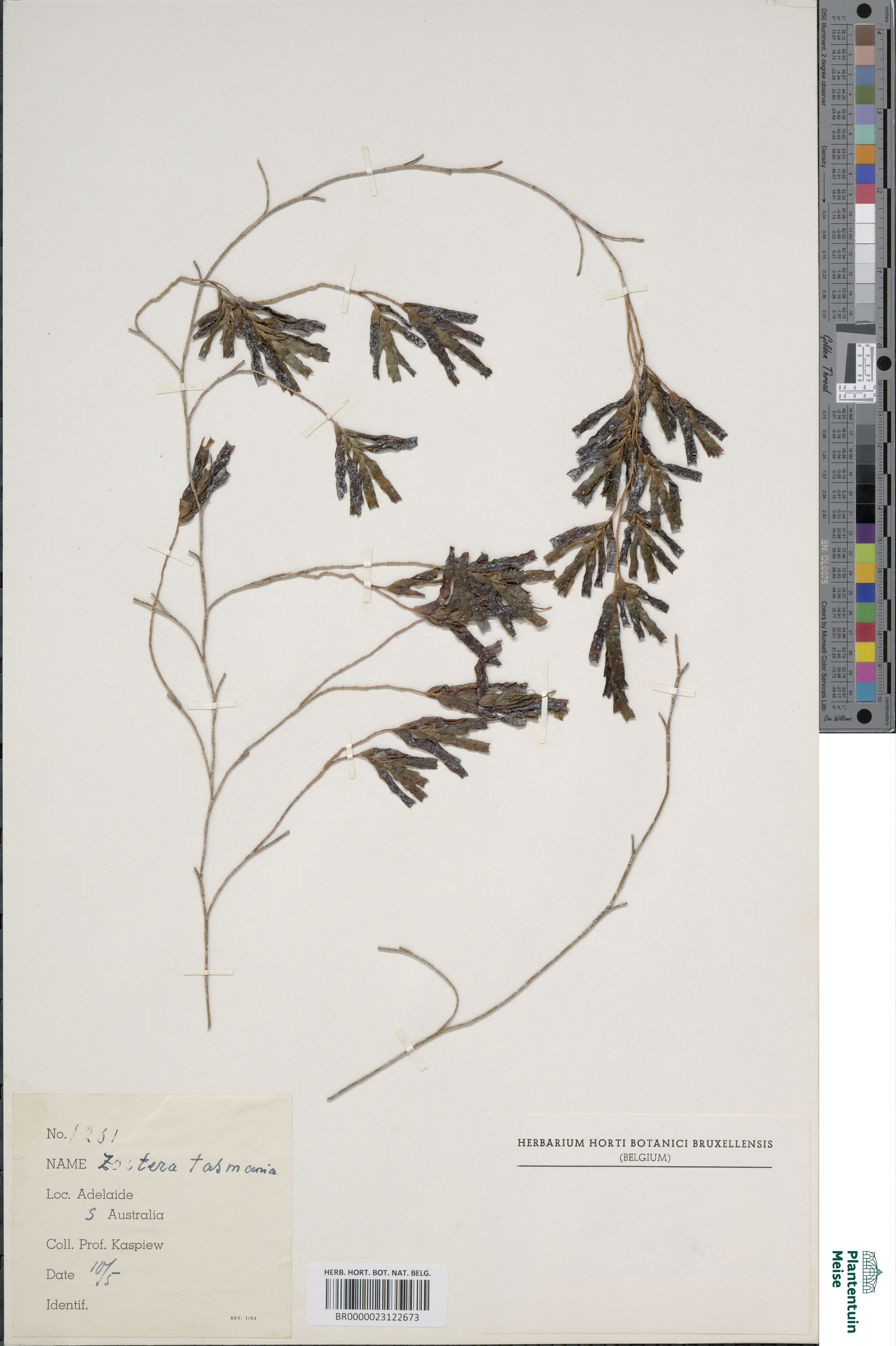
- Image of herbarium specimen in the Meise Botanic Garden Herbarium

Conservation status
- Least Concern (IUCN 3.1)

Scientific classification
- Kingdom: Plantae
- Clade: Tracheophytes
- Clade: Angiosperms
- Clade: Monocots
- Order: Alismatales
- Family: Zosteraceae
- Genus: Zostera
- Species: Z. tasmanica

Binomial name
- Zostera tasmanica M.Martens ex Asch.

Synonyms
- Heterozostera tasmanica (M.Martens ex Asch.) Hartog

= Zostera tasmanica =

Species of plant in the family Zosteraceae

Zostera tasmanica is a species of marine eelgrass in the Zosteraceae family. It is native to the seacoasts of Tasmania, New South Wales, Victoria, South Australia, and Western Australia.
