= Zostera polychlamys =

Flinders Bay eelgrass

Conservation status
- Least Concern (IUCN 3.1)

Scientific classification
- Kingdom: Plantae
- Clade: Tracheophytes
- Clade: Angiosperms
- Clade: Monocots
- Order: Alismatales
- Family: Zosteraceae
- Genus: Zostera
- Species: Z. polychlamys

Binomial name
- Zostera polychlamys (John Kuo) S.W.L.Jacobs & Les

Synonyms
- Heterozostera polychlamys J.Kuo

Species of plant

Zostera polychlamys is a species of eelgrass native to the shores of South Australia and Western Australia. It was first discovered at Flinders Bay in Western Australia in 1990.
