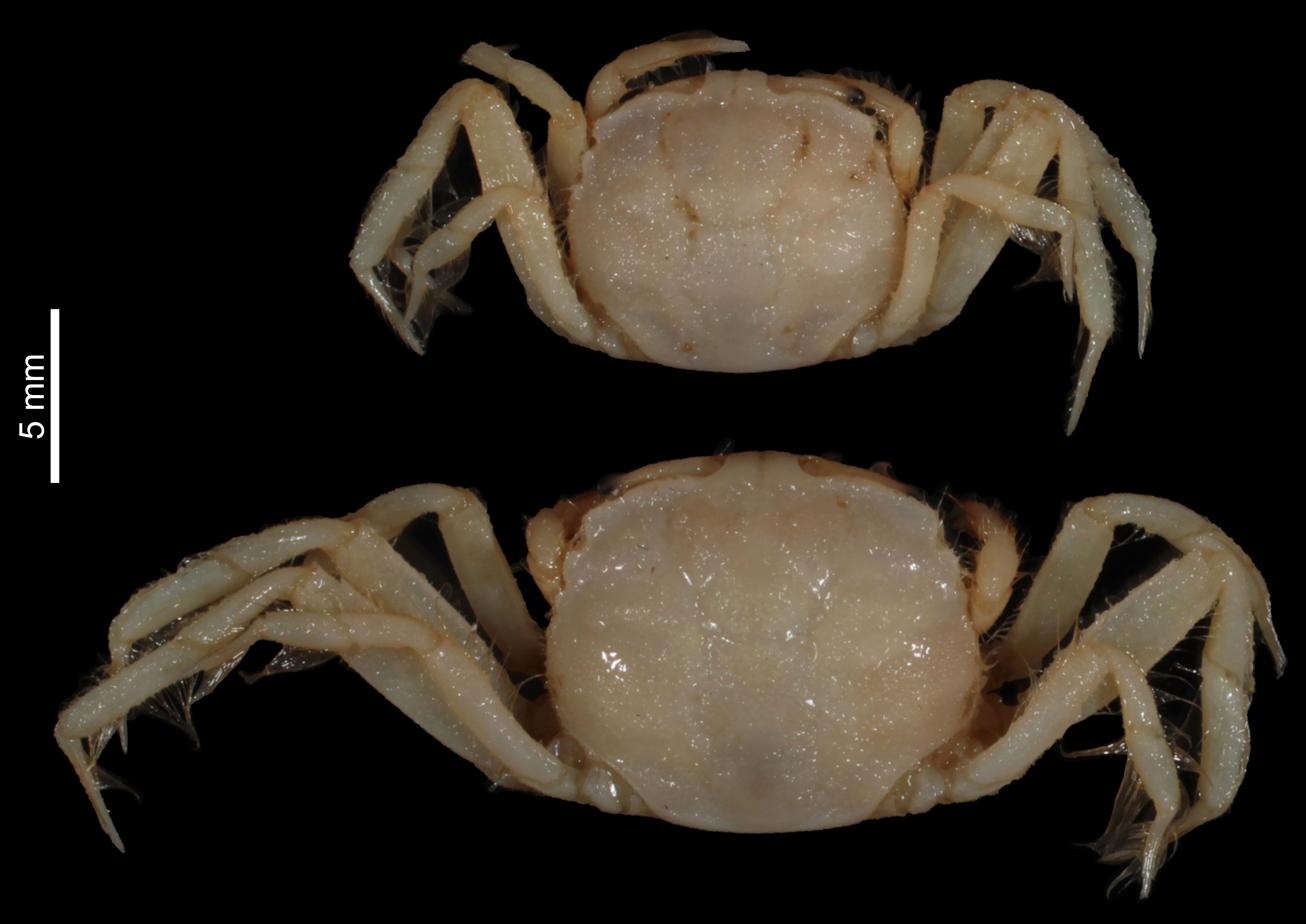

Scientific classification
- Domain: Eukaryota
- Kingdom: Animalia
- Phylum: Arthropoda
- Class: Malacostraca
- Order: Decapoda
- Suborder: Pleocyemata
- Infraorder: Brachyura
- Family: Macrophthalmidae
- Genus: Euplax
- Species: E. dagohoyi

Binomial name
- Euplax dagohoyi (Mendoza & Ng, 2007)

Synonyms
- Macrophthalmus (Euplax) dagohoyi Mendoza & Ng, 2007

= Euplax dagohoyi =

Species of crab

Euplax dagohoyi is a species of crab in the family Macrophthalmidae. It was described by Mendoza & Ng in 2007.
