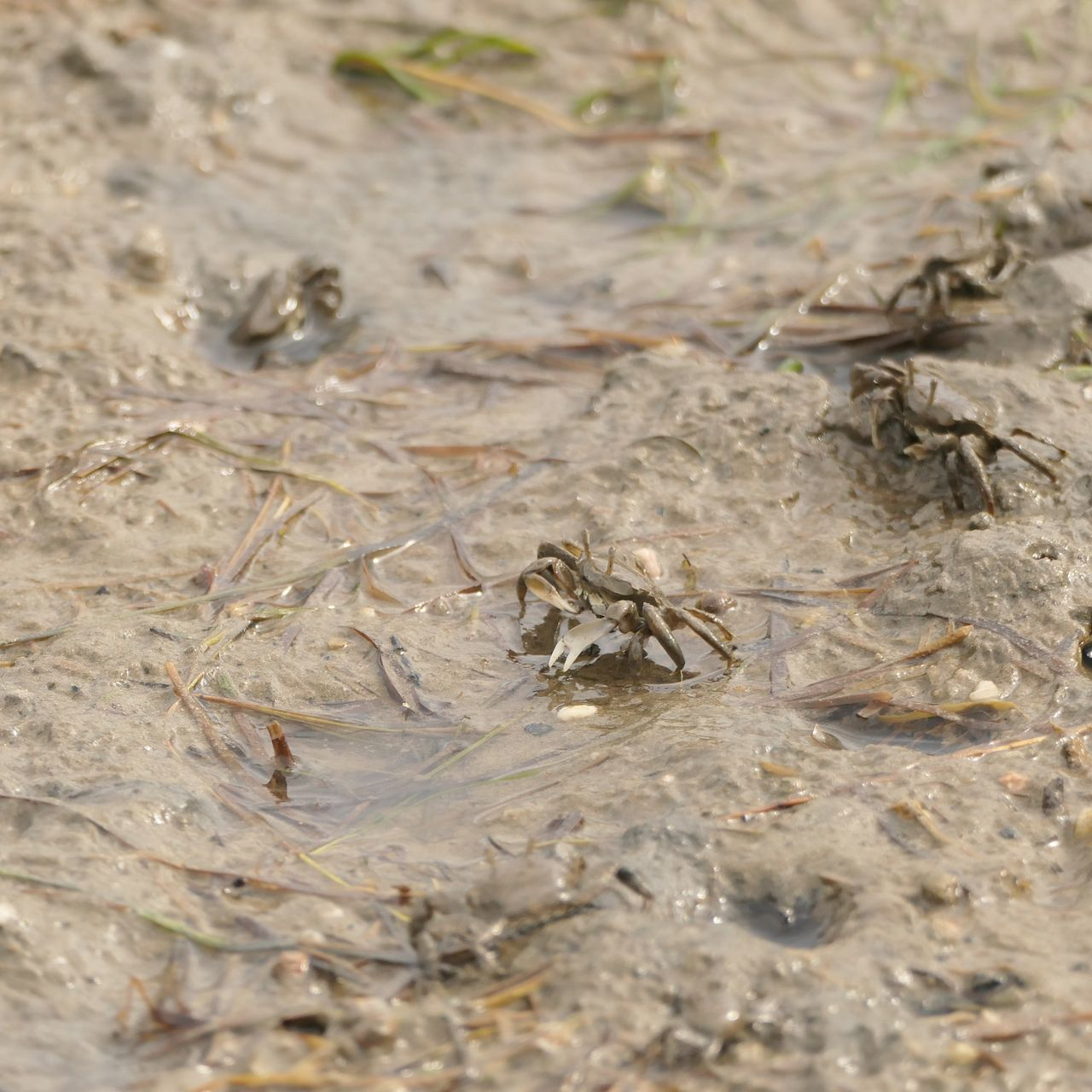

Scientific classification
- Domain: Eukaryota
- Kingdom: Animalia
- Phylum: Arthropoda
- Class: Malacostraca
- Order: Decapoda
- Suborder: Pleocyemata
- Infraorder: Brachyura
- Family: Macrophthalmidae
- Subfamily: Macrophthalminae
- Genus: Tasmanoplax; Barnes, 1967
- Species: T. latifrons

Binomial name
- Tasmanoplax latifrons (Haswell, 1881)

= Tasmanoplax =

Species of crustacean

Tasmanoplax latifrons, commonly known as the southern sentinel crab, is a species of crab found on the south-east coast of Australia, from Tasmania to southern NSW, as far north as the Hunter river. It inhabits tidal mudflats with seagrass, and forms burrows. It is the only species in the genus Tasmanoplax.

The carapace is up to about 30 mm (1.2 in) across. It can be distinguished from the semaphore crab (Heloecius cordiformis) that looks similar and is found in similar mudflat habitat, as it has notches in the side of the carapace (also described as three teeth, including one at the eye). It is yellow brown, with setae on the legs, especially the last two.
