= Zostera nigricaulis =

Kangaroo Island eelgrass

Conservation status
- Least Concern (IUCN 3.1)

Scientific classification
- Kingdom: Plantae
- Clade: Tracheophytes
- Clade: Angiosperms
- Clade: Monocots
- Order: Alismatales
- Family: Zosteraceae
- Genus: Zostera
- Species: Z. nigricaulis

Binomial name
- Zostera nigricaulis (J.Kuo) S.W.L.Jacobs & Les

Synonyms
- Heterozostera chilensis J.Kuo; Heterozostera nigricaulis J.Kuo; Zostera chilensis (J.Kuo) S.W.L.Jacobs & Les

Species of plant

Zostera nigricaulis is a species of eelgrass native to the seacoasts of New South Wales, Victoria, South Australia, Western Australia and Tasmania, and across the Pacific in Chile. It was first discovered on Kangaroo Island in South Australia in 1988.
