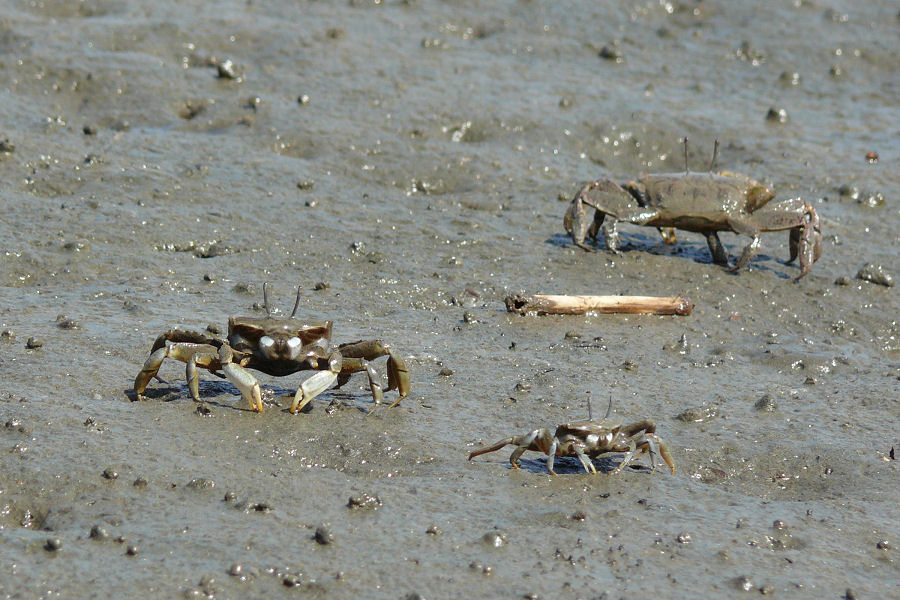
- Three individuals in Kawasaki, Kanagawa Prefecture, Japan

Scientific classification
- Kingdom: Animalia
- Phylum: Arthropoda
- Class: Malacostraca
- Order: Decapoda
- Suborder: Pleocyemata
- Infraorder: Brachyura
- Family: Macrophthalmidae
- Genus: Macrophthalmus
- Subgenus: Mareotis
- Species: M. japonicus

Binomial name
- Macrophthalmus japonicus (De Haan, 1835)

= Macrophthalmus japonicus =

Species of crab

Macrophthalmus japonicus, the Japanese mud crab, is a species of sentinel crab in the family Macrophthalmidae native to Asia. The taxon was described by Wilhem de Haan in 1835.
