= Chaenostoma boscii =

Scientific classification
- Domain: Eukaryota
- Kingdom: Animalia
- Phylum: Arthropoda
- Class: Malacostraca
- Order: Decapoda
- Suborder: Pleocyemata
- Infraorder: Brachyura
- Family: Macrophthalmidae
- Genus: Chaenostoma
- Species: C. boscii

Binomial name
- Chaenostoma boscii Audouin, 1826

Synonyms
- Macrophthalmus boscii

Species of crab

Chaenostoma boscii is a species of crab in the family Macrophthalmidae, described by Audouin in 1826.
