= Zostera caespitosa =

Clumped eelgrass

Conservation status
- Vulnerable (IUCN 3.1)

Scientific classification
- Kingdom: Plantae
- Clade: Tracheophytes
- Clade: Angiosperms
- Clade: Monocots
- Order: Alismatales
- Family: Zosteraceae
- Genus: Zostera
- Species: Z. caespitosa

Binomial name
- Zostera caespitosa Miki

Species of aquatic plant

Zostera caespitosa is a species of eelgrass native to the shores of northeastern Asia: Japan, Korea, northeastern China (Liaoning), and the Russian Far East (Kuril Islands).
