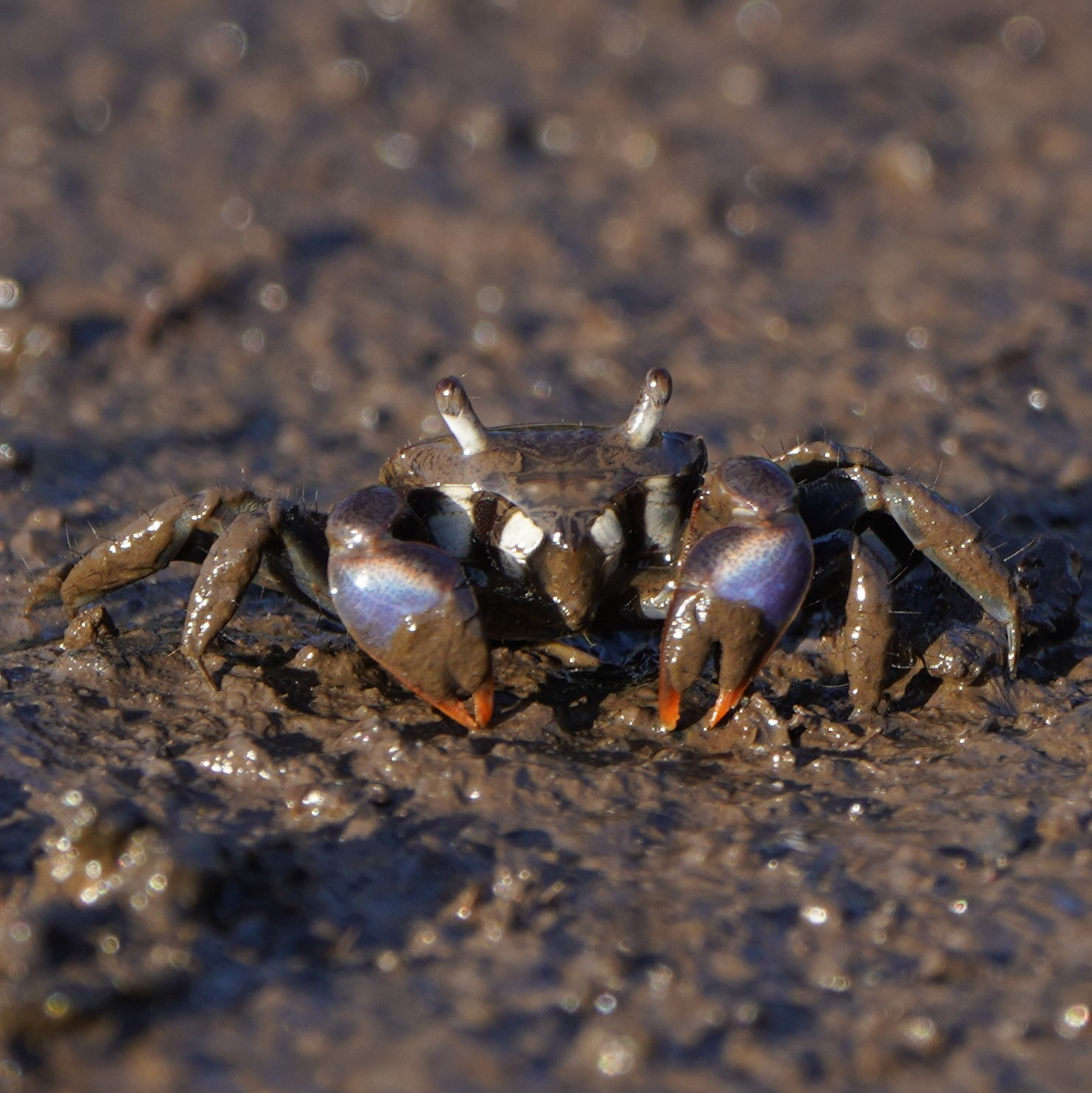

Scientific classification
- Kingdom: Animalia
- Phylum: Arthropoda
- Clade: Pancrustacea
- Class: Malacostraca
- Order: Decapoda
- Suborder: Pleocyemata
- Infraorder: Brachyura
- Family: Macrophthalmidae
- Genus: Australoplax; Barnes, 1966
- Species: A. tridentata

Binomial name
- Australoplax tridentata Barnes, 1966

= Australoplax =

Genus of crabs

Australoplax is a genus of crabs which are spread along the north-eastern coastline of Australia. The only species in this genus is Australoplax tridentata, commonly known as the furry-clawed crab or tuxedo shore crab, found in Queensland, New South Wales and the Northern Territory.

== Description ==
Claws are blue. Adult males have large claws, adult females small claws. Adult males have a patch of fur at the base of the fingers. The carapace breadth is up to 15 millimetres (0.59 in). It lives in mangroves and muddy creek banks.
