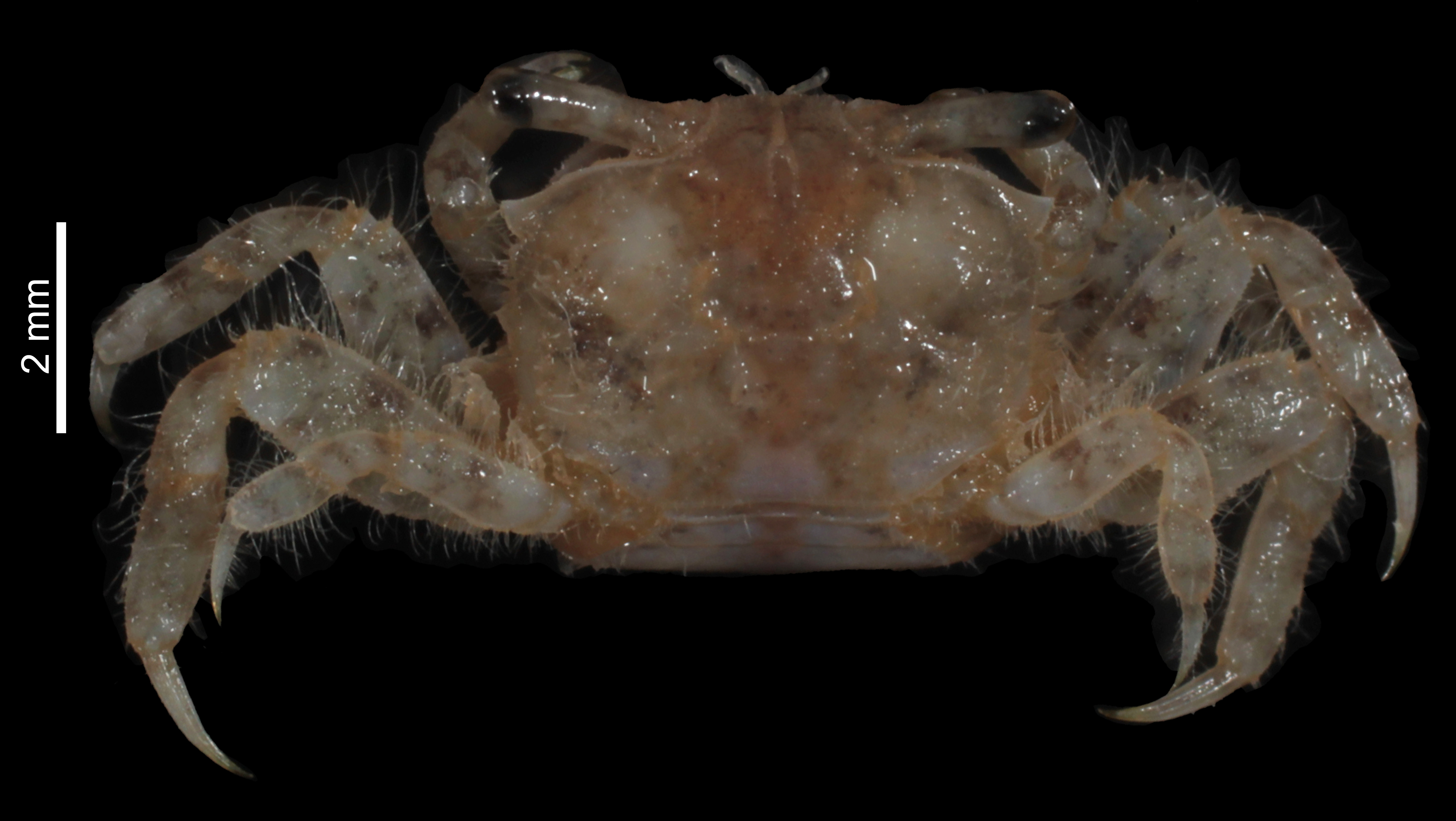
- Chaenostoma crassimanus

Scientific classification
- Domain: Eukaryota
- Kingdom: Animalia
- Phylum: Arthropoda
- Class: Malacostraca
- Order: Decapoda
- Suborder: Pleocyemata
- Infraorder: Brachyura
- Family: Macrophthalmidae
- Subfamily: Macrophthalminae
- Genus: Chaenostoma; Stimpson, 1858

= Chaenostoma (crab) =

Genus of crustaceans

Chaenostoma is a genus of crabs belonging to the family Macrophthalmidae.

The species of this genus are found in Africa, Australia and Southeastern Asia.

Species:

- Chaenostoma boscii (Audouin, 1826)
- Chaenostoma crassimanus Stimpson, 1858
- Chaenostoma java Naderloo, 2013
- Chaenostoma orientale Stimpson, 1858
- Chaenostoma punctulatus (Miers, 1884)
- Chaenostoma sinuspersici (Naderloo & Türkay, 2011)
