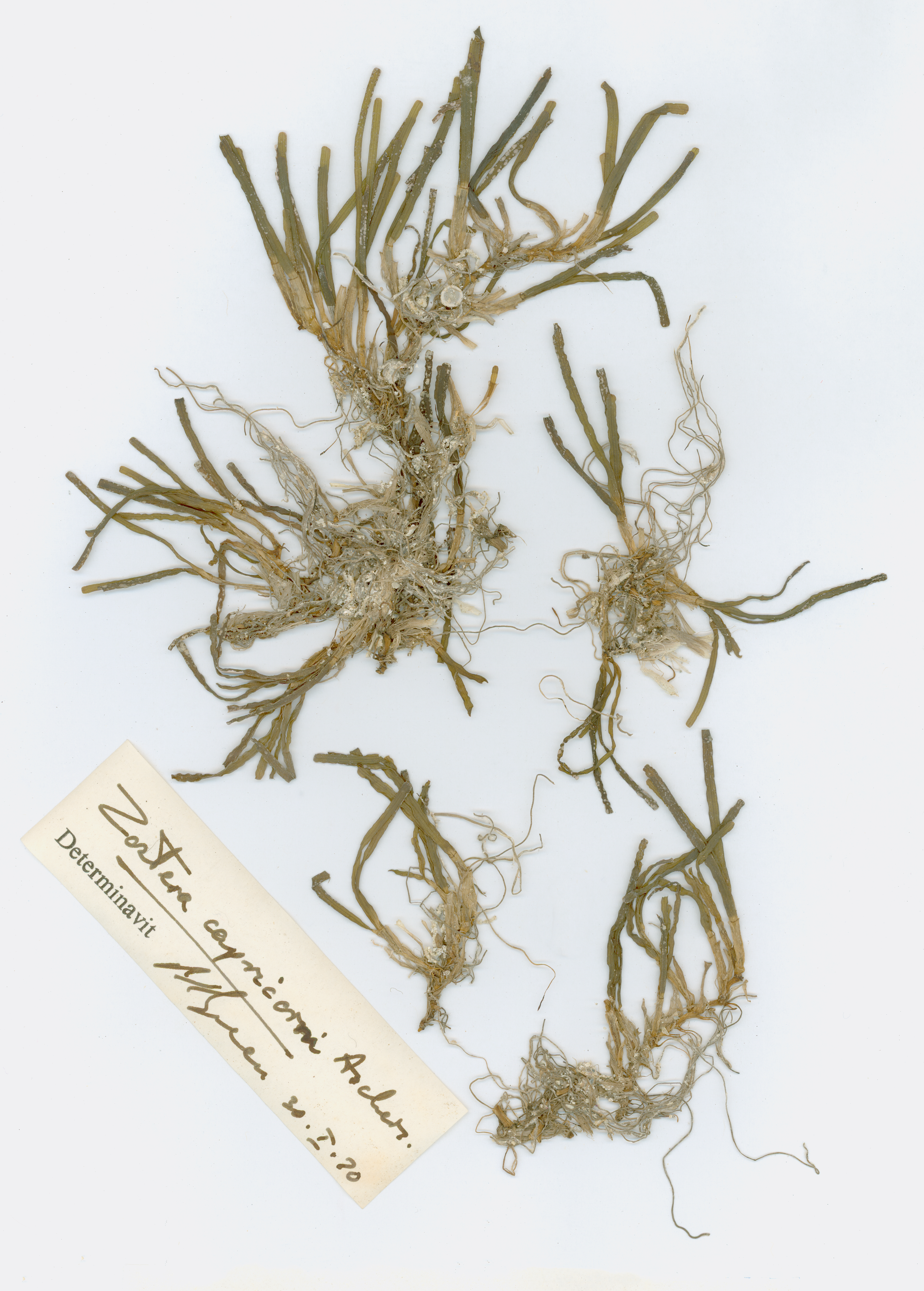

Scientific classification
- Kingdom: Plantae
- Clade: Embryophytes
- Clade: Tracheophytes
- Clade: Spermatophytes
- Clade: Angiosperms
- Clade: Monocots
- Order: Alismatales
- Family: Zosteraceae
- Genus: Zostera
- Species: Z. capricorni

Binomial name
- Zostera capricorni Asch.

Synonyms
- Nanozostera capricorni (Asch.) Toml. & Posl.; Zostera muelleri subsp. capricorni (Asch.) S.W.L.Jacobs

= Zostera capricorni =

Species of plant

Zostera capricorni is a species of eelgrass in the Zosteraceae family. It is native to the seacoasts of New Guinea, Australia (Queensland, New South Wales, Victoria, South Australia), Norfolk Island and the North Island of New Zealand. It was first discovered at Moreton Bay in Queensland in 1875.
