= Chaenostoma punctulatus =

Scientific classification
- Domain: Eukaryota
- Kingdom: Animalia
- Phylum: Arthropoda
- Class: Malacostraca
- Order: Decapoda
- Suborder: Pleocyemata
- Infraorder: Brachyura
- Family: Macrophthalmidae
- Genus: Chaenostoma
- Species: C. punctulatus

Binomial name
- Chaenostoma punctulatus (Miers, 1884)

Synonyms
- Macrophthalmus punctulatus Miers, 18844

Species of crab

Chaenostoma punctulatus is a species of crab in the family Macrophthalmidae. It was described by Miers in 1884.
