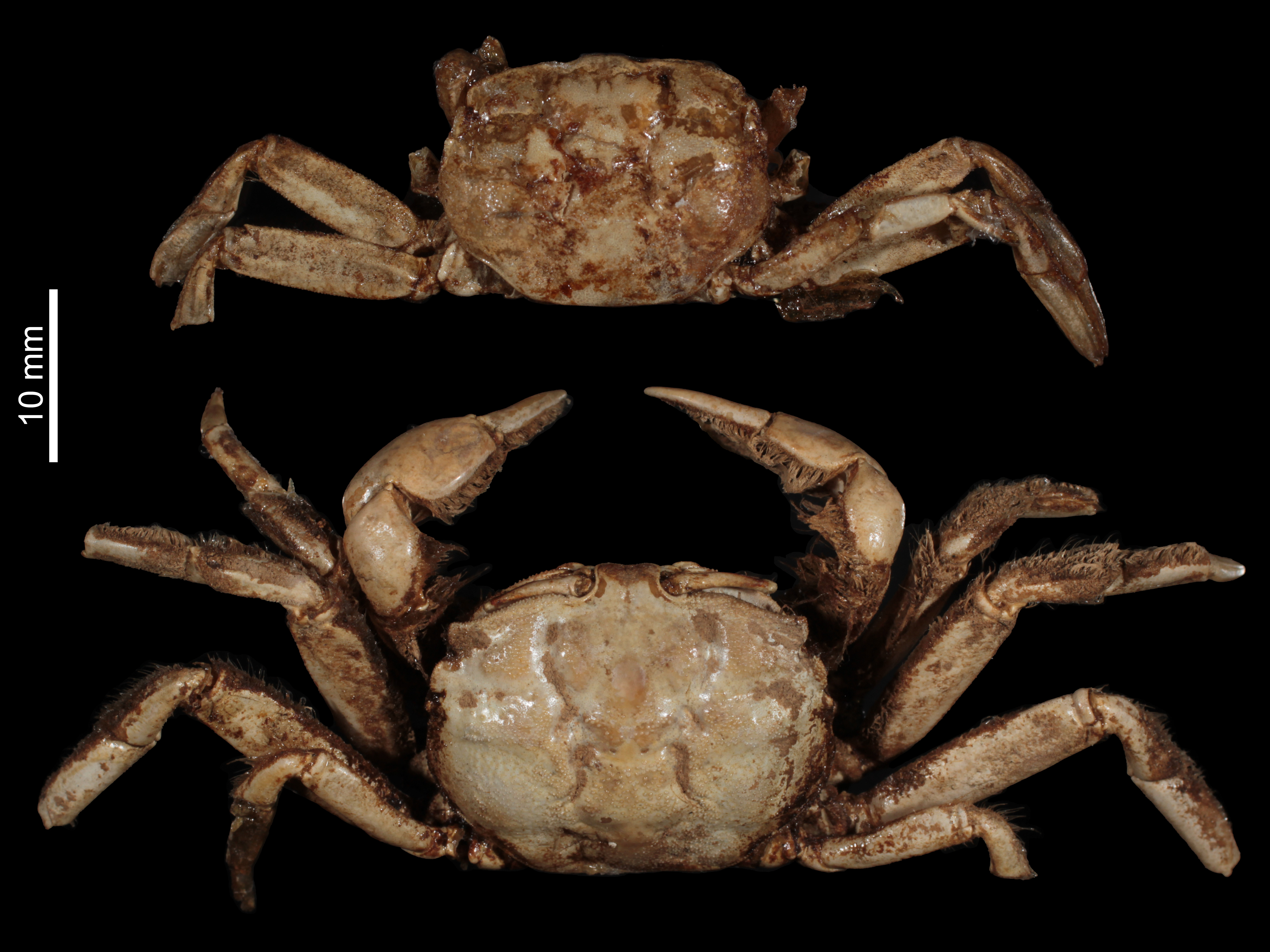

Scientific classification
- Domain: Eukaryota
- Kingdom: Animalia
- Phylum: Arthropoda
- Class: Malacostraca
- Order: Decapoda
- Suborder: Pleocyemata
- Infraorder: Brachyura
- Family: Macrophthalmidae
- Genus: Euplax
- Species: E. leptophthalmus

Binomial name
- Euplax leptophthalmus H. Milne-Edwards, 1852

Synonyms
- Macrophthalmus leptophthalmus {H. Milne-Edwards, 1852)

= Euplax leptophthalmus =

Species of crab

Euplax leptophthalmus is a species of crab in the family Macrophthalmidae. It was described by H. Milne-Edwards in 1852.
