= Zostera caulescens =

Honshu eelgrass

Conservation status
- Near Threatened (IUCN 3.1)

Scientific classification
- Kingdom: Plantae
- Clade: Tracheophytes
- Clade: Angiosperms
- Clade: Monocots
- Order: Alismatales
- Family: Zosteraceae
- Genus: Zostera
- Species: Z. caulescens

Binomial name
- Zostera caulescens Miki

Species of aquatic plant

Zostera caulescens is a species of eelgrass native to the shores of northeastern Asia: Japan, Korea, northeastern China (Liaoning), and the Russian Far East (Kuril Islands).
