= Zostera mucronata =

Mandurah eelgrass

Scientific classification
- Kingdom: Plantae
- Clade: Tracheophytes
- Clade: Angiosperms
- Clade: Monocots
- Order: Alismatales
- Family: Zosteraceae
- Genus: Zostera
- Species: Z. mucronata

Binomial name
- Zostera mucronata Hartog

Synonyms
- Nanozostera mucronata (Hartog) Toml. & Posl.; Zostera muelleri subsp. mucronata (Hartog) S.W.L.Jacobs

Species of plant

Zostera mucronata is a species of eelgrass native to the seacoasts of South Australia and Western Australia.
