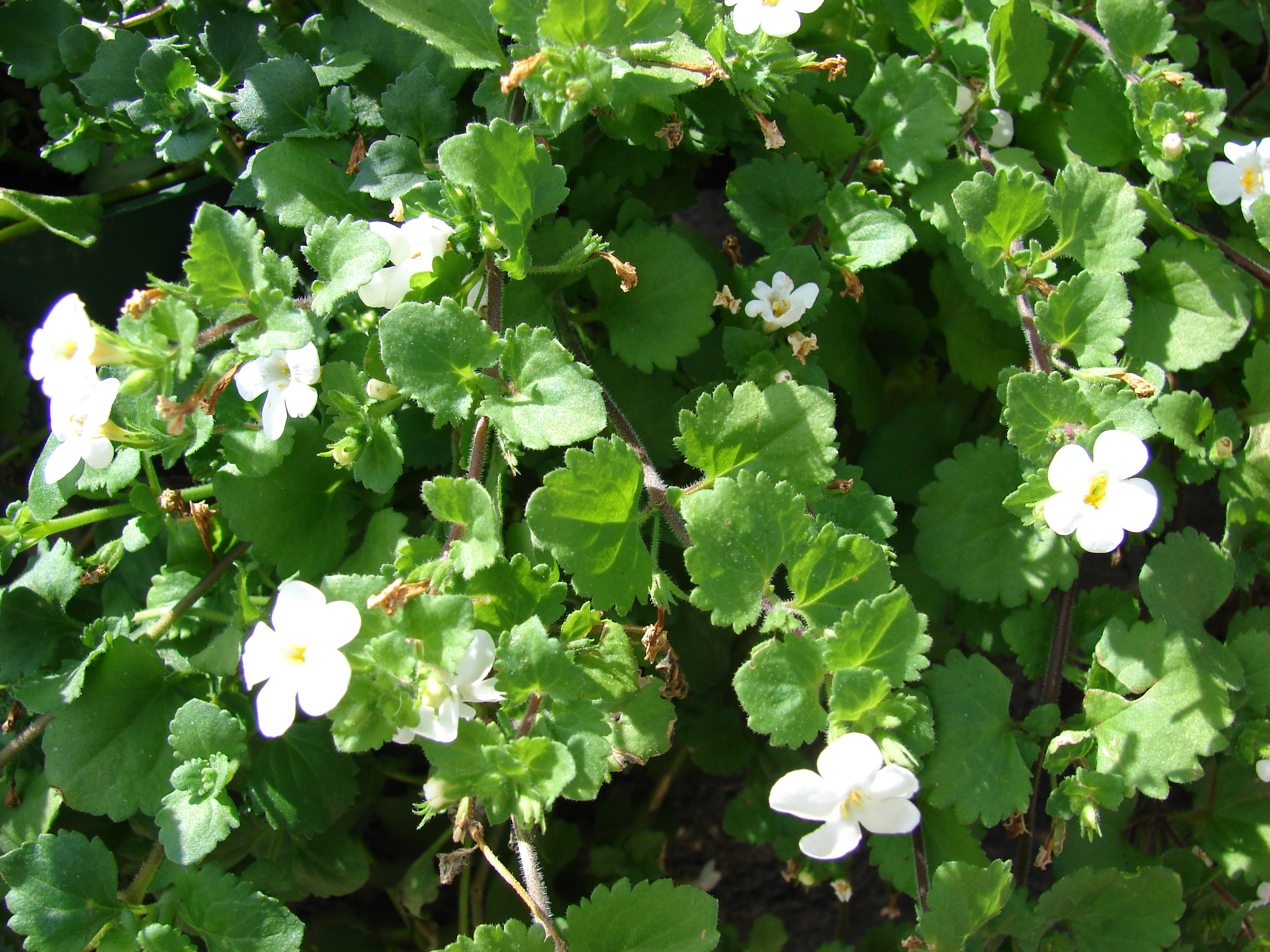
- Sutera cordata

Scientific classification
- Kingdom: Plantae
- Clade: Tracheophytes
- Clade: Angiosperms
- Clade: Eudicots
- Clade: Asterids
- Order: Lamiales
- Family: Scrophulariaceae
- Tribe: Limoselleae
- Genus: Chaenostoma; Benth.

= Chaenostoma (plant) =

Genus of flowering plants

Chaenostoma is a genus of flowering plants belonging to the family Scrophulariaceae.

Its native range is Southern Tropical and Southern Africa.

It is often referred to as the "Pikmin Flower" due to its strong resemblance to the flowers that appear on Pikmin from Nintendo's video game series Pikmin. Chaenostoma cordatum was originally bred to look like Pikmin creatures at full bloom.

Species:

- Chaenostoma aethiopicum (L.) Benth.
- Chaenostoma affine Bernh.
- Chaenostoma archeri (Compton) Kornhall
- Chaenostoma caeruleum (L.f.) Kornhall
- Chaenostoma calciphilum (Hilliard) Kornhall
- Chaenostoma calycinum Benth.
- Chaenostoma campanulatum Benth.
- Chaenostoma cinereum (Hilliard) Kornhall
- Chaenostoma comptonii (Hilliard) Kornhall
- Chaenostoma cordatum (Thunb.) Benth.
- Chaenostoma debile (Hutch.) Kornhall
- Chaenostoma decipiens (Hilliard) Kornhall
- Chaenostoma denudatum Benth.
- Chaenostoma floribundum Benth.
- Chaenostoma glabratum Benth.
- Chaenostoma glanduliferum (Hilliard) Kornhall
- Chaenostoma halimifolium Benth.
- Chaenostoma hispidum (Thunb.) Benth.
- Chaenostoma impeditum (Hilliard) Kornhall
- Chaenostoma integrifolium (L.f.) Benth.
- Chaenostoma langebergense (Hilliard) Kornhall
- Chaenostoma leve (Hiern) Kornhall
- Chaenostoma longipedicellatum (Hilliard) Kornhall
- Chaenostoma macrosiphon Schltr.
- Chaenostoma marifolium Benth.
- Chaenostoma multiramosum (Hilliard) Kornhall
- Chaenostoma neglectum J.M.Wood & M.S.Evans
- Chaenostoma paniculatum (Hilliard) Kornhall
- Chaenostoma patrioticum (Hiern) Kornhall
- Chaenostoma pauciflorum Benth.
- Chaenostoma placidum (Hilliard) Kornhall
- Chaenostoma platysepalum (Hiern) Kornhall
- Chaenostoma polelense (Hiern) Kornhall
- Chaenostoma polyanthum Benth.
- Chaenostoma racemosum Benth.
- Chaenostoma revolutum (Thunb.) Benth.
- Chaenostoma roseoflavum (Hiern) Kornhall
- Chaenostoma rotundifolium Benth.
- Chaenostoma septentrionale (Hilliard) Kornhall
- Chaenostoma subnudum N.E.Br.
- Chaenostoma subsessile (Hilliard) Kornhall
- Chaenostoma subspicatum Benth.
- Chaenostoma tenuicaule (Hilliard) Kornhall
- Chaenostoma titanophilum (Hilliard) Kornhall
- Chaenostoma uncinatum (Desr.) Kornhall
- Chaenostoma violaceum Schltr.
