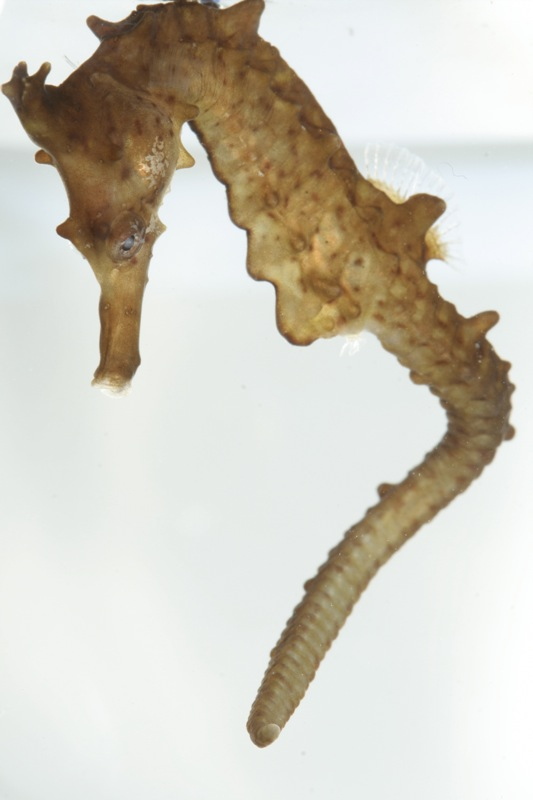

Conservation status
- Data Deficient (IUCN 3.1)
- CITES Appendix II (CITES)

Scientific classification
- Kingdom: Animalia
- Phylum: Chordata
- Class: Actinopterygii
- Order: Syngnathiformes
- Family: Syngnathidae
- Genus: Hippocampus
- Species: H. coronatus

Binomial name
- Hippocampus coronatus Temminck & Schlegel, 1850

= Crowned seahorse =

Species of fish

Hippocampus coronatus, commonly known as the high-crowned seahorse or crowned seahorse, is a species of fish of the family Syngnathidae. It is endemic to the Pacific coastal waters of Japan (found in shallow coastal waters from Tokyo bay and Sagami bay), where it lives among Zostera seagrasses. It can grow to lengths of 10.8 centimetres (4.3 in), but is more commonly 6 centimetres (2.4 in). Individuals feed mainly on small crustaceans such as gammarid amphipods and copepods, although this can vary by size, with smaller individuals consuming copepods while larger individuals feed on amphipods and mysids. This species is ovoviviparous, with males brooding eggs in a brood pouch before giving birth to live young. Breeding season occurs from June to November, with females and males reaching sexual maturity at 6.9 centimetres (2.7 in) and 7.3 centimetres (2.9 in) respectively. Male brood size ranges from 12–46. The International trade in this species has been monitored through Appendix II of the CITES licensing system since 2004 and a minimum size of 10 centimetres (3.9 in) applies to traded specimens.

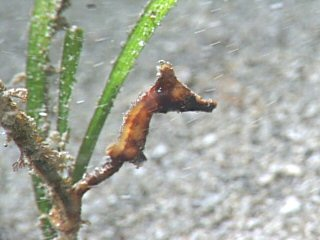
Juvenile crowned seahorse

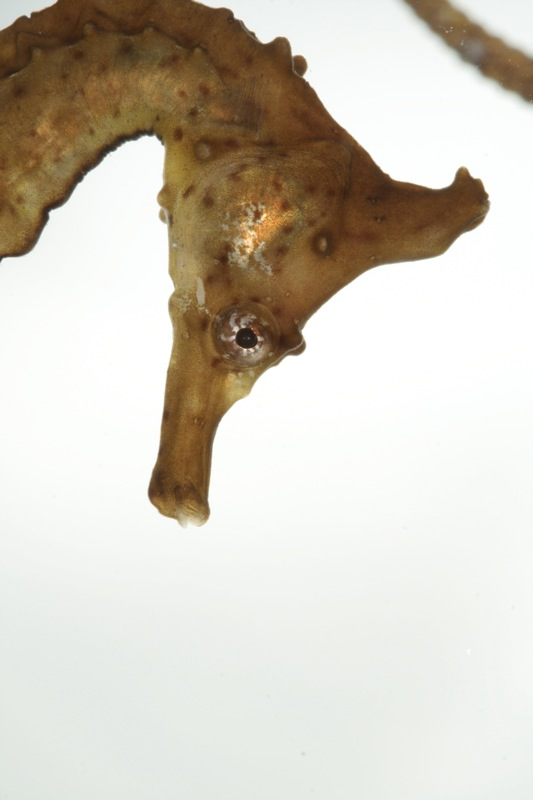
Close-up of the head of crowned seahorse

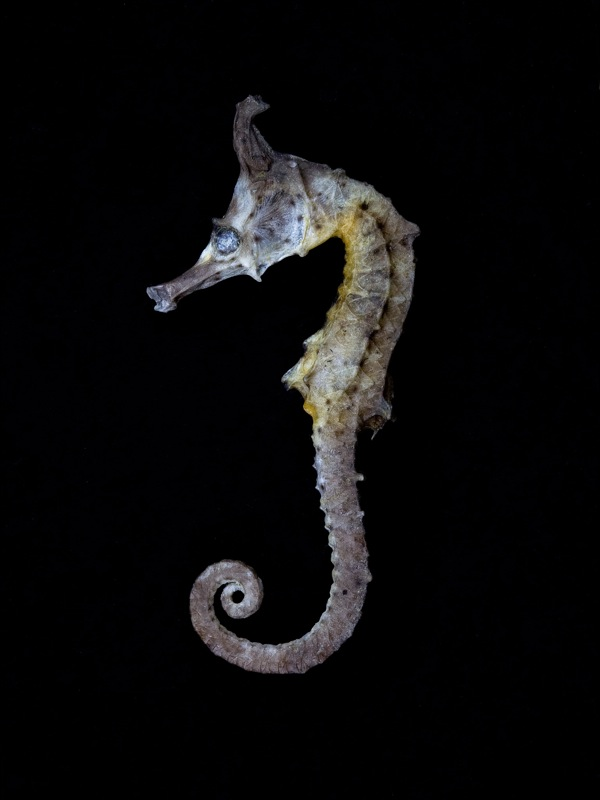
A dried crowned seahorse specimen

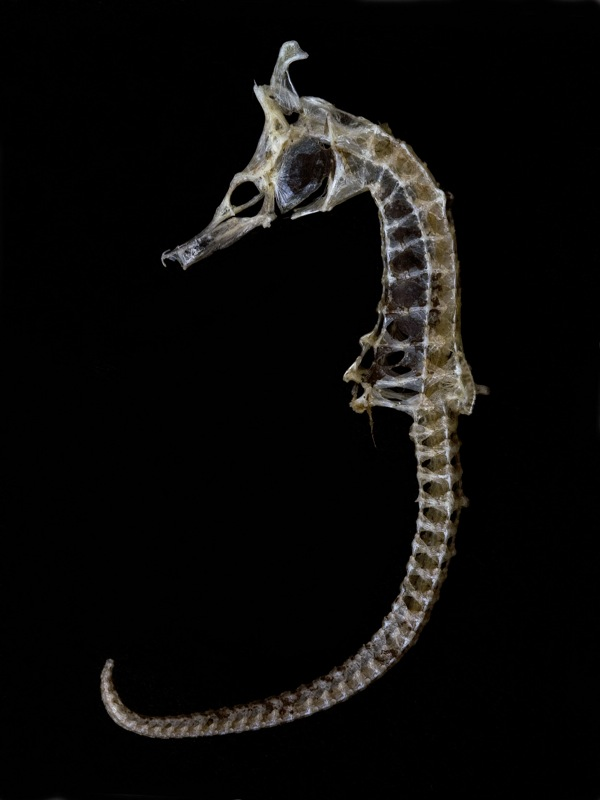
Crowned seahorse skeleton
