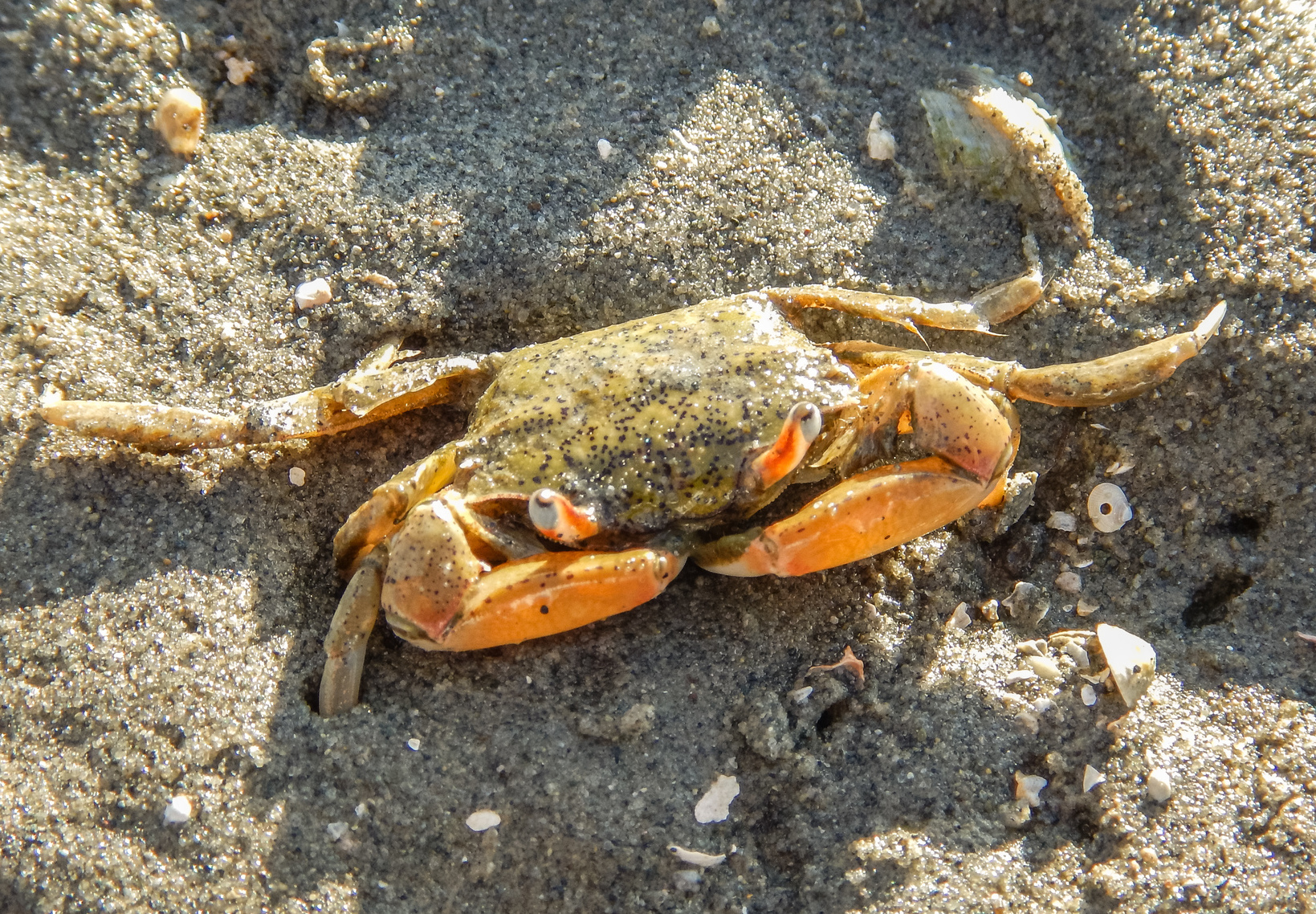
- Stalk-eyed mud crab at Manukau Harbour in Auckland

Scientific classification
- Kingdom: Animalia
- Phylum: Arthropoda
- Clade: Pancrustacea
- Class: Malacostraca
- Order: Decapoda
- Suborder: Pleocyemata
- Infraorder: Brachyura
- Family: Macrophthalmidae
- Genus: Macrophthalmus
- Species: M. hirtipes

Binomial name
- Macrophthalmus hirtipes (Jacquinot in Hombron & Jacquinot, 1846)

Synonyms
- Cleistostoma hirtipes (Hombron & Jacquinot, 1846); Macrophthalmus (Hemiplax) hirtipes (Hombron & Jacquinot, 1846); Metaplax hirtipes Heller, 1865

= Stalk-eyed mud crab =

Species of crab

The stalk-eyed mud crab (Macrophthalmus hirtipes) is a marine large-eyed crab of the family Macrophthalmidae, endemic to New Zealand including Campbell Island. It grows to around 30 millimetres (1.2 in) shell width.

Macrophthalmus hirtipes is either a member of the genus Macrophthalmus, where it is the sister lineage to all other members of the genus and the only species in the subgenus Hemiplax, or it is the only species in the genus Hemiplax, which is sister to Macrophthalmus.
