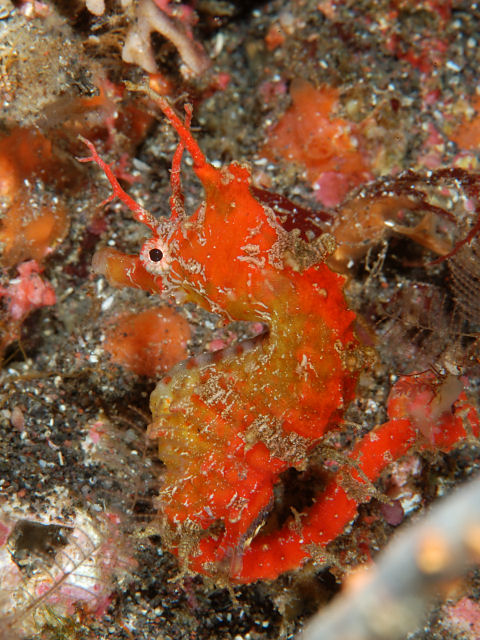
- Hippocampus sindonis

Conservation status
- Least Concern (IUCN 3.1)
- CITES Appendix II (CITES)

Scientific classification
- Kingdom: Animalia
- Phylum: Chordata
- Class: Actinopterygii
- Order: Syngnathiformes
- Family: Syngnathidae
- Genus: Hippocampus
- Species: H. sindonis

Binomial name
- Hippocampus sindonis (D. S. Jordan & Snyder, 1901)

= Shiho's seahorse =

Species of fish

Shiho's seahorse or Sindo's Seahorse, painted seahorse (Hippocampus sindonis) is a species of fish in the family Syngnathidae. It is endemic to the Pacific coastal waters of Japan (from Wakayama pref. to Chiba pref.). This species reaches a length of ca. 8 cm. It was listed by the IUCN Red List as Vulnerable in 1996 and Data Deficient in 2003, but was later reclassified as Least Concern. The specific name honours Michitaro Sindo, who was originally from Yamaguchi and who was assistant curator of fishes at Stanford University.

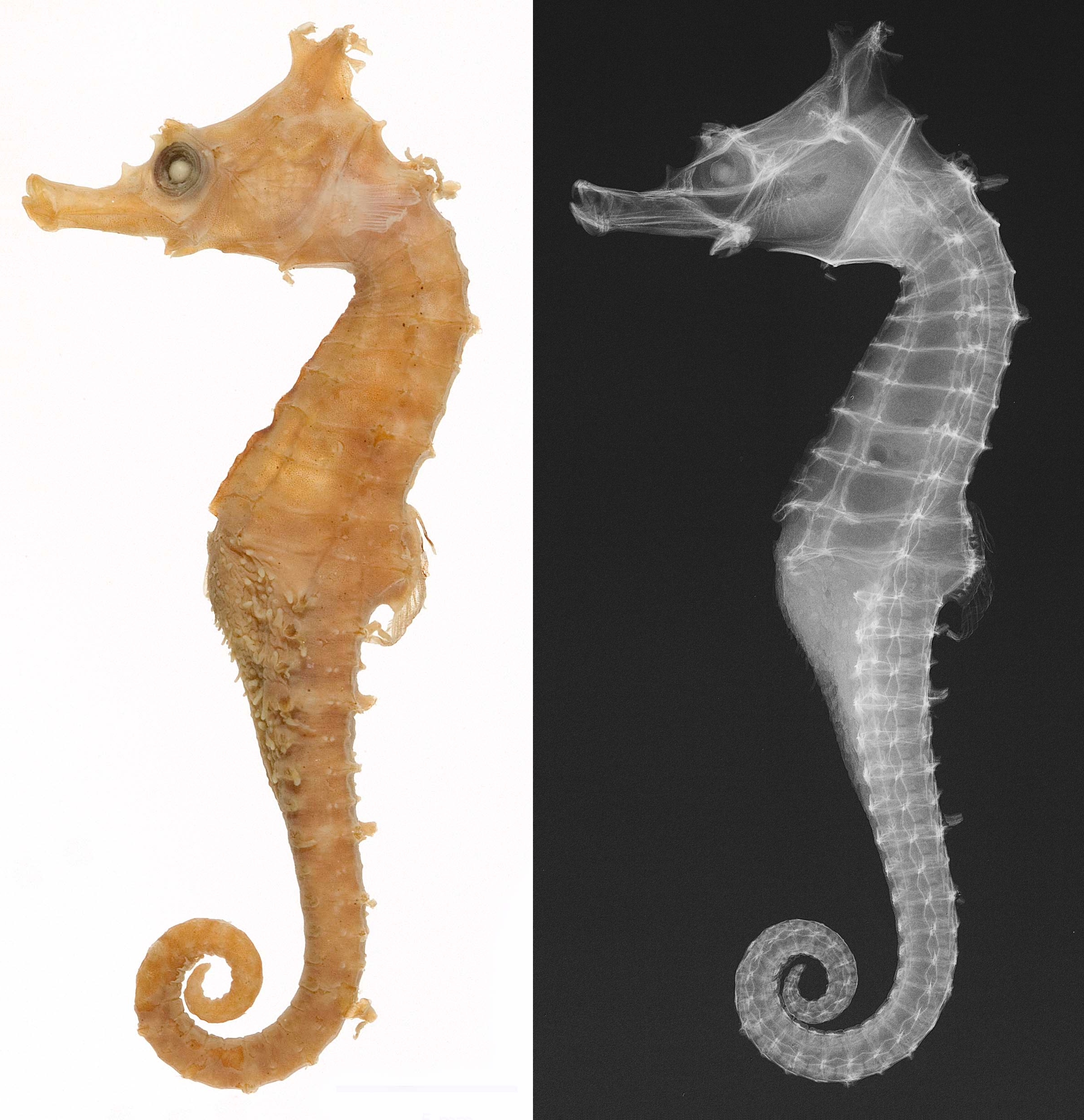
Hippocampus sindonis, conventional and X-ray images of holotype
