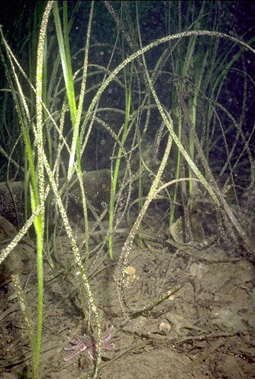
- Zostera marina

Scientific classification
- Kingdom: Plantae
- Clade: Tracheophytes
- Clade: Angiosperms
- Clade: Monocots
- Order: Alismatales
- Family: Zosteraceae
- Genus: Zostera; L.
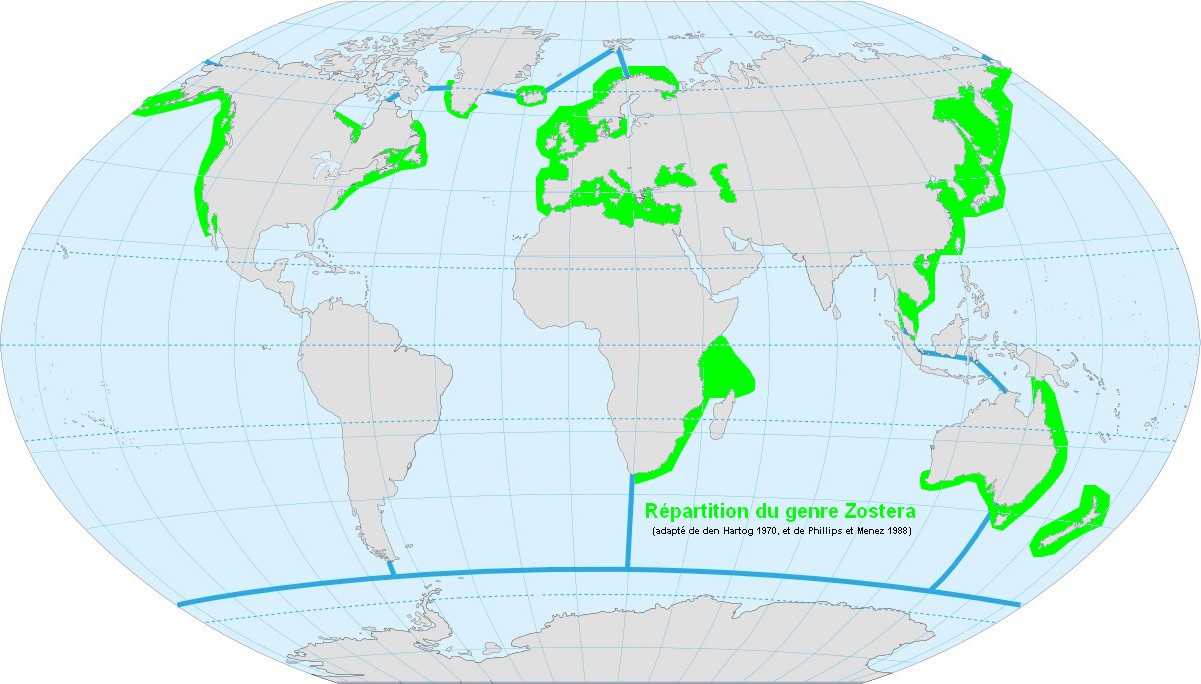
- Global distribution map of Zostera. Green indicates presence.

Synonyms
- Alga Tourn. ex Lam.; Heterozostera (Setch.) Hartog; Nanozostera Toml. & Posl.

= Zostera =

Zostera (marine eelgrasses)

Genus of aquatic plants

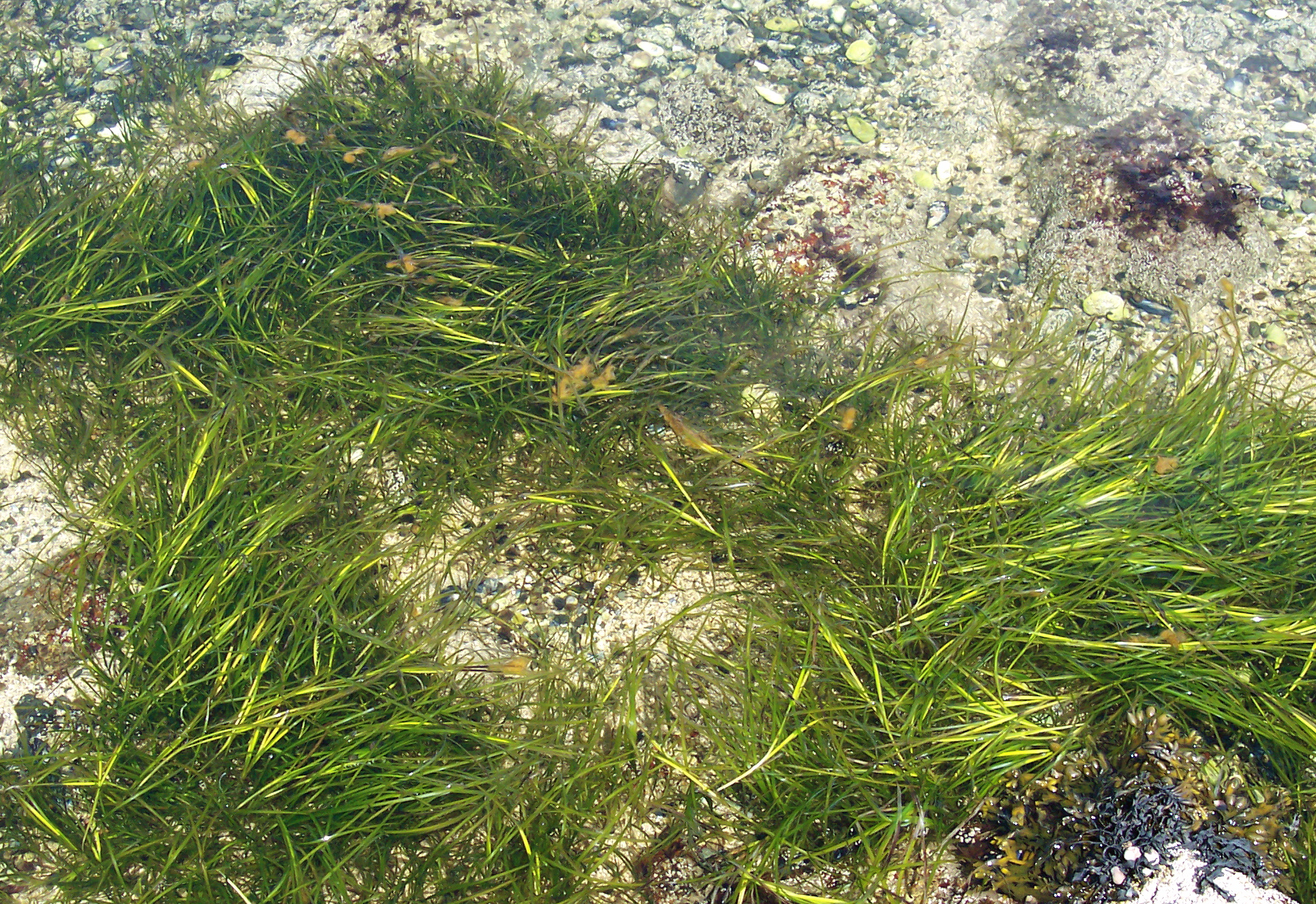
Zostera sp in Mussel Ridge Channel, Birch Island, Maine

Zostera is a small genus of widely distributed seagrasses, commonly called marine eelgrass, or simply seagrass or eelgrass. The genus Zostera contains 9 to 15 species, according to different authors.

== Ecology ==
Zostera marina is found on sandy substrates or, in estuaries, usually submerged or partially floating. Most Zostera are perennial. They have long, bright green, ribbon-like leaves, the width of which are about 1 centimetre (0.4 in). Short stems grow up from extensive, white branching rhizomes. The flowers are enclosed in the sheaths of the leaf bases; the fruits are bladdery and can float.

Zostera beds are important for sediment deposition, substrate stabilization, as substrate for epiphytic algae and micro-invertebrates, and as nursery grounds for many species of important fish and shellfish. Zostera often forms beds in bay mud in the estuarine setting. It is an important food for brant geese and wigeons, and even (occasionally) caterpillars of the grass moth Dolicharthria punctalis.

The slime mold Labyrinthula zosterae can cause the wasting disease of Zostera, with Z. marina being particularly susceptible, causing a decrease in the populations of the fauna that depend on Zostera.

Zostera is able to maintain its turgor at a constant pressure in response to fluctuations in environmental osmolarity. It achieves this by losing solutes as the tide goes out and gaining solutes as the tide comes in.

== Distribution ==
The genus as a whole is widespread throughout seashores of much of the Northern Hemisphere as well as Australia, New Zealand, Southeast Asia and southern Africa. In 2005 an isolated population of Zostera was discovered on the Pacific coast of South America and described as new species Z. chilensis. Later analyses concluded that this population was related to Zostera nigricaulis which is distributed on the coast of Austrailia. One species (Z. noltii) occurs along the land-locked Caspian Sea.

== Uses ==
Eelgrass has been used for food by the Seri tribe of Native Americans on the coast of Sonora, Mexico. The rhizomes and leaf-bases of eelgrass were eaten fresh or dried into cakes for winter food. It was also used for smoking deer meat. The Seri language has many words related to eelgrass and eelgrass-harvesting. The month of April is called xnoois ihaat iizax, literally "the month when the eelgrass seed is mature".

Zostera has also been used as packing material and as stuffing for mattresses and cushions.

On the Danish island of Læsø it has been used for thatching roofs. Roofs of eelgrass are said to be heavy, but also much longer-lasting and easier to thatch and maintain than roofs done with more conventional thatching material. More recently, the plant has been used in its dried form for insulation in eco-friendly houses and as a ground cover in permaculture gardens, once its salt layer washed off (ex: Friland, Danish eco-village).

In the United States, eelgrass insulation was commercially marketed in the early 1900s as Cabot's Quilt by the Samuel Cabot Co of Boston. However, due to an outbreak of Labyrinthula zosterae which destroyed crops of eelgrass, combined with the collapse of the homebuilding industry due to the Great Depression, it went out of production and was replaced in new homes with fiberglass (introduced in the late 1930s).

Some studies show promise for eelgrass meadows to sequester atmospheric carbon to reduce anthropogenic climate change.

== Species ==
Accepted species

- Zostera asiatica Miki – Russian Far East, Japan, Korea, NE China
- Zostera caespitosa Miki – Russian Far East, Japan, Korea, NE China
- Zostera capensis Setchell – Madagascar; Kenya to Cape Province
- Zostera capricorni Ascherson – New Guinea, Australia, New Zealand
- Zostera caulescens Miki – Russian Far East, Japan, Korea, NE China
- Zostera chilensis (J. Kuo) S. W. L. Jacobs & D. H. Les – Chile
- Zostera japonica Ascherson & Graebner – Russian Far East, Japan, Korea, China, Vietnam
- Zostera marina L. – shores of North Pacific, North Atlantic, British Isles Mediterranean, Black Sea, Sea of Okhotsk
- Zostera mucronata den Hartog – Australia
- Zostera muelleri Irmisch ex Ascherson – Australia
- Zostera nigricaulis (J.Kuo) S.W.L.Jacobs & D.H.Les – Australia
- Zostera noltii Hornem. – shores of Northeastern Atlantic, Mediterranean, Black Sea, Caspian Sea
- Zostera novazelandica Setchell – New Zealand
- Zostera polychlamys (J.Kuo) S.W.L.Jacobs & D.H.Les – Australia
- Zostera tasmanica Martens ex Ascherson – Australia
