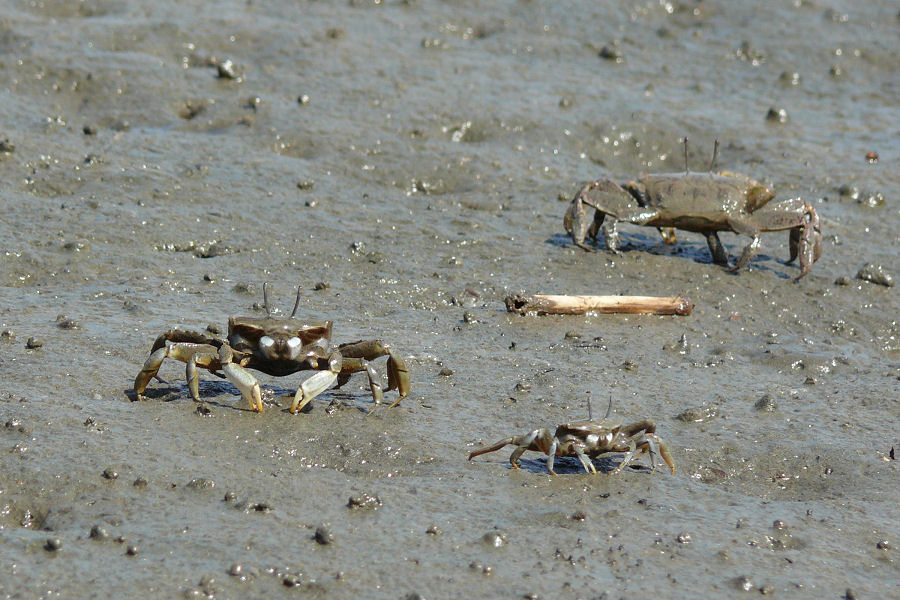
- Macrophthalmus japonicus

Scientific classification
- Kingdom: Animalia
- Phylum: Arthropoda
- Clade: Pancrustacea
- Class: Malacostraca
- Order: Decapoda
- Suborder: Pleocyemata
- Infraorder: Brachyura
- Superfamily: Ocypodoidea
- Family: Macrophthalmidae; Dana, 1851

= Macrophthalmidae =

Family of crabs

The Macrophthalmidae, commonly referred to as sentinel crabs, are a family of crabs, comprising these subfamilies and genera:

Ilyograpsinae Števčić, 2005

- Apograpsus Komai & Wada, 2008
- Ilyograpsus Barnard, 1955

Macrophthalminae Dana, 1851

- Australoplax Barnes, 1966
- Enigmaplax Davie, 1993
- Hemiplax Heller, 1865
- Lutogemma Davie, 2008
- Macrophthalmus Desmarest, 1823
- Tasmanoplax Barnes, 1967
- Venitus Barnes, 1967

Tritodynamiinae Števčić, 2005

- Tritodynamia Ortmann, 1894
