= Pygmy seahorse =

Common name for several species of fish

The pygmy seahorses comprise several species of tiny seahorse in the family Syngnathidae (seahorses and pipefishes) and in the order Syngnathiformes, which contains fishes with fused jaws that suck food into tubular mouths. Pygmy seahorses are found in Southeast Asia in the Coral Triangle area. They are some of the smallest seahorse species in the world, typically measuring less than 2 centimetres (0.79 in) in height.

The first pygmy seahorse discovered was Hippocampus bargibanti. At least six more species were named after 2000. The first species discovered lives exclusively on fan corals and matches their colour and appearance. So effective is pygmy seahorse camouflage that it was discovered only when a host gorgonian was being examined in a laboratory. In 1969 a New Caledonian scientist, Georges Bargibant, was collecting specimens of Muricella spp gorgonians for the Nouméa museum and whilst one of these was on his dissection table he happened to notice a pair of tiny seahorses. The next year they were officially named by Whitley as Bargibant's pygmy seahorse. Other species live on soft corals or are free-ranging among seagrasses and algae.

== Description ==
The pygmy seahorse is both tiny and well camouflaged. It is very difficult to spot amongst the sea grasses, soft corals, or gorgonians (sea fans) that it inhabits. Other distinctive pygmy seahorse characteristics include a fleshy head and body, a very short snout, and a long, prehensile tail. With their short snouts, they have the appearance of baby animals. Pygmy seahorses are 14–27 millimetres (0.55–1.06 in) long from the tip of the tail to the end of the snout, so that their vertical height while swimming is still smaller. An adult may be as small as 13 millimetres (0.51 in) long.

True pygmy seahorses have distinctive morphological markers. Unlike other seahorses, they have a single gill opening on the back of the head, instead of two on the sides and the males brood their eggs within the abdomen rather than in a pouch on the tail. Males and females are distinguished by openings at the bottom of the trunk: females have a tiny, raised round pore for extruding eggs and males have a fore-and-aft slit for accepting them.

== Species ==
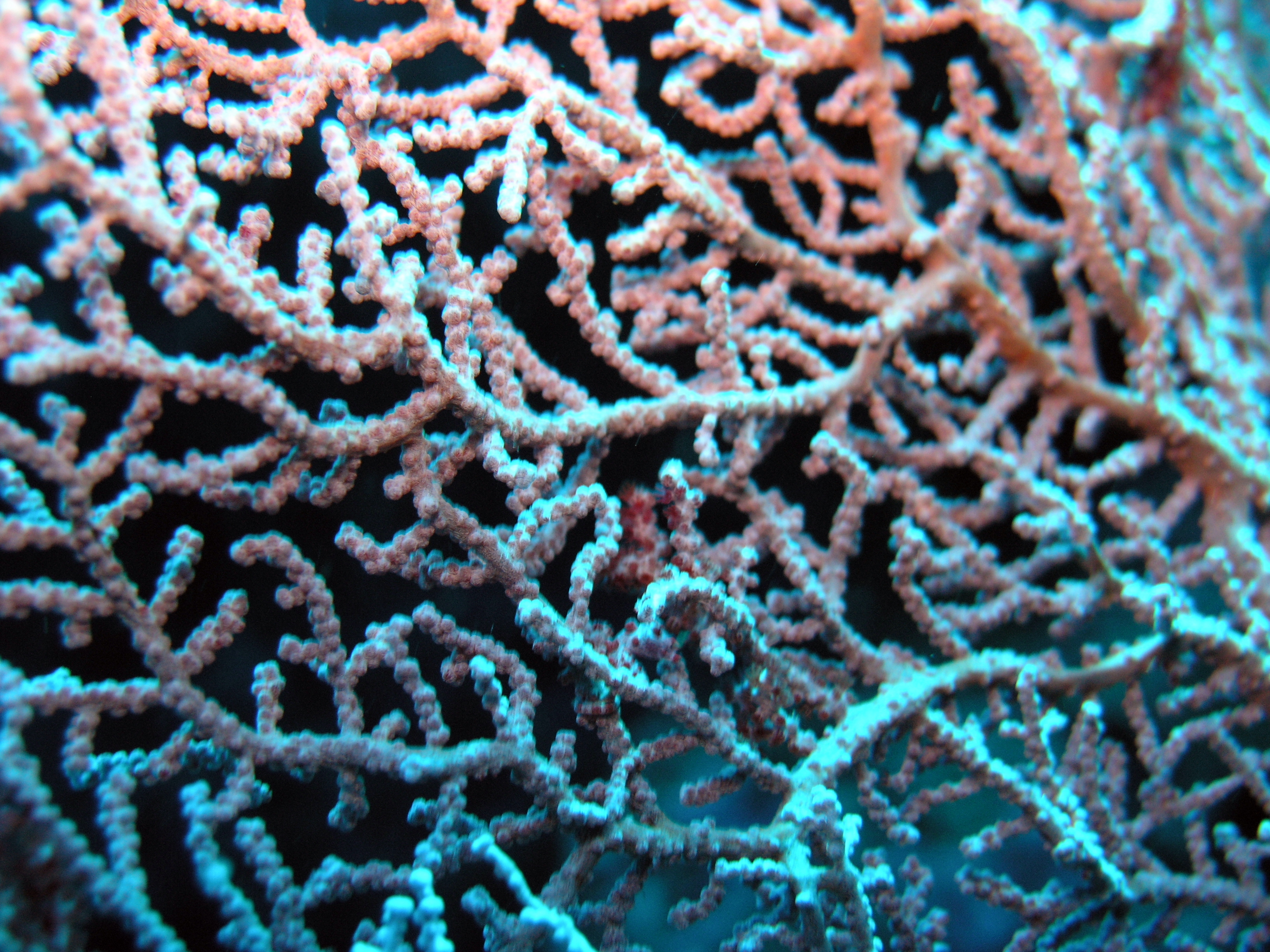
Well-camouflaged pygmy seahorse on a gorgonian coral Muricella sp. See this image to identify the pygmy seahorse.

Bargibant's pygmy seahorse (Hippocampus bargibanti) photographed at a depth of 23 metres (75 ft) in Anilao, Philippines

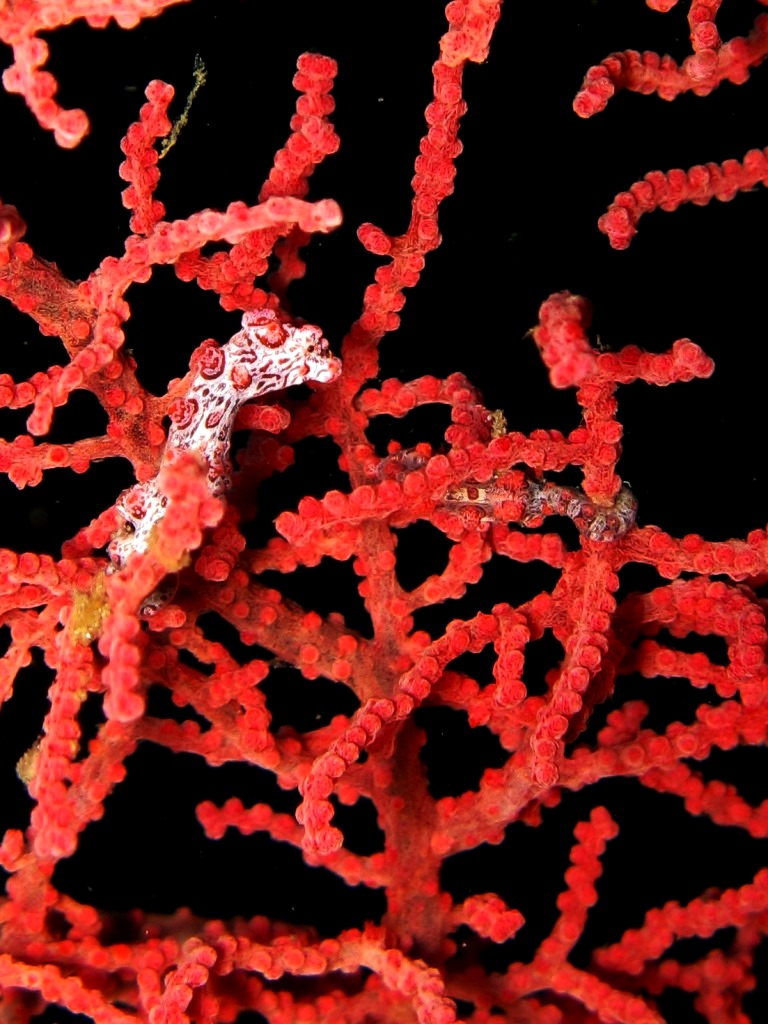
Pygmy seahorse found while diving Nudi's Fall, Lembeh, Indonesia

The known species are these:

- Bargibant's pygmy seahorse (Hippocampus bargibanti) are always found on gorgonian corals of the genus Muricella, and live their whole adult life on a single coral. Their colour varies, seeming to match the coral that they live on: pink, yellow, lavender, or brown. They are the largest pygmy seahorse at almost 2.7 cm (1.1 in). They have the largest range: "from southern tropical Japan, throughout the Philippines, Indonesia, east to Palau, Papua New Guinea, Solomon Islands, Fiji, Vanuatu and the Great Barrier Reef in Australia." They are found at 16–40 m (52–131 ft) depth.
- Denise's pygmy seahorse (Hippocampus denise) was described in 2003. Its range is from Borneo to New Guinea, Solomon Islands and Palau. They must live on gorgonian corals but have been found on eight different genera: Acanthogorgia, Annella, Echinogorgia, Ellisella, Melithaea, Muricella, Verrucella and Villogorgia. Each pygmy seahorse stays on the same coral for its entire adult life. The young settle onto a host and over a few days take on its exact colour and texture, accounting for the wide variation in adults, but typically red, orange, or yellow. They grow up to 2.4 cm (0.94 in) long. They have smooth skin with few tubercles. They have a bent, asymmetrical appearance. Females have a slender body with a small bulge at the base of the trunk, while males are rounder. They are found at depths of 13–90 m (43–295 ft). Underwater photographer Denise Tackett noticed that they were different from H. bargibanti and brought them to the attention of scientists.
- Pontoh's pygmy seahorse (Hippocampus pontohi) was named in 2008. This species is free-living, not associated with gorgonian corals, and tends to live in shallower water of 3–20 m (9.8–66 ft). They are found in the Coral Triangle area: Indonesia, Papua New Guinea, Solomon Islands and Fiji. They can be found anywhere on tropical reefs in their range. However, they are most often seen in pairs or small groups in clumps of the calcareous alga, Halimeda and on the hydroid Aglaephenia cupressina. They are often found where Halimeda grows out of reef walls. Divers report them on many types of seagrass and algae, moving frequently to different hitching spots. They are almost identical in shape to the Severn's pygmy seahorse, but are a different colour: white with pink or yellow patches. They lack tubercules. The trunk is round but thin when viewed from behind. They are seen in high-current areas at depths of 11–25 m (36–82 ft).
- Satomi's pygmy seahorse (Hippocampus satomiae), named in 2008, are the world's smallest seahorse at up to 1.4 cm (0.55 in). This is a free-living species that is found near coral walls with soft corals. They are nocturnal and very active at night. They have been found in only a few places in Indonesia and northern Borneo. They can be brown to pale with specific markings such as a dark spot in front of each relatively large eye. Spines cover the entire body. Both males and females have a round trunk. They are found at 15–20 m (49–66 ft) deep in groups of 3 to 5.
- Severn's pygmy seahorse (Hippocampus severnsi) is a free-living species described in 2008. They are almost the same shape as Pontoh's pygmy seahorse, but are a different colour: pale brown with red and orange patches. They can be found on any part of the reef, but often on hydroids and algal turf in pairs or small group. They are no larger than 1.7 cm (0.67 in).
- Walea soft coral pygmy seahorse (Hippocampus waleananus) lives on and around soft coral. The soft coral have fat stems and this seahorse has a correspondingly long tail. They vary from pale pink to yellow. It has a very small range: it lives only in the Tomini Gulf of central Sulawesi, Indonesia, and depends on the continued existence of soft corals there.
- Coleman's pygmy seahorse (Hippocampus colemani) is probably restricted to Lord Howe Island off the east coast of Australia. However, there are unconfirmed reports from eastern Papua New Guinea and Taiwan. This pygmy seahorse was found in the lagoon of Lord Howe Island living on seagrass, mainly Zostera and Halophila. It was described in 2003. It is white, yellow, or gold with white spots outlined in red. It has a very small snout and well-defined nose spine. Both males and females are rotund.
- Japanese pygmy seahorse (Hippocampus japapigu) First described in April 2018. One of the more diminutive species of the genus, the species reaches around 1.6 cm (0.63 in) in length. Uniquely among seahorses, the species has a dorsal ridge of triangular bony mounds. It is native to soft coral and algal reefs around Japan. This pygmy seahorse was founded by Dr.Graham Short and his colleagues who attend the California Academy of Sciences. They represent the fifth species of Pygmy seahorse that has been recorded in Japan.
- Sodwana pygmy seahorse (Hippocampus nalu) is the second most recently described species.

=== Other dwarf species ===
Other small seahorses are sometimes called pygmy seahorses, but lack the single gill opening and trunk brooding that distinguish the true pygmy seahorse. They can be called dwarf seahorses:

- Red Sea soft coral pygmy seahorse, Hippocampus debelius, endemic to the Red Sea
- Bullneck seahorse, Hippocampus minotaur, from southeast Australia
- Paradoxical seahorse, Hippocampus paradoxus, from southwest Australia
- Manaia pygmy pipehorse (Cylix tupareomanaia) found in New Zealand waters has been given an indigenous scientific name and the Ngātiwai iwi (tribe) listed as a naming author.
