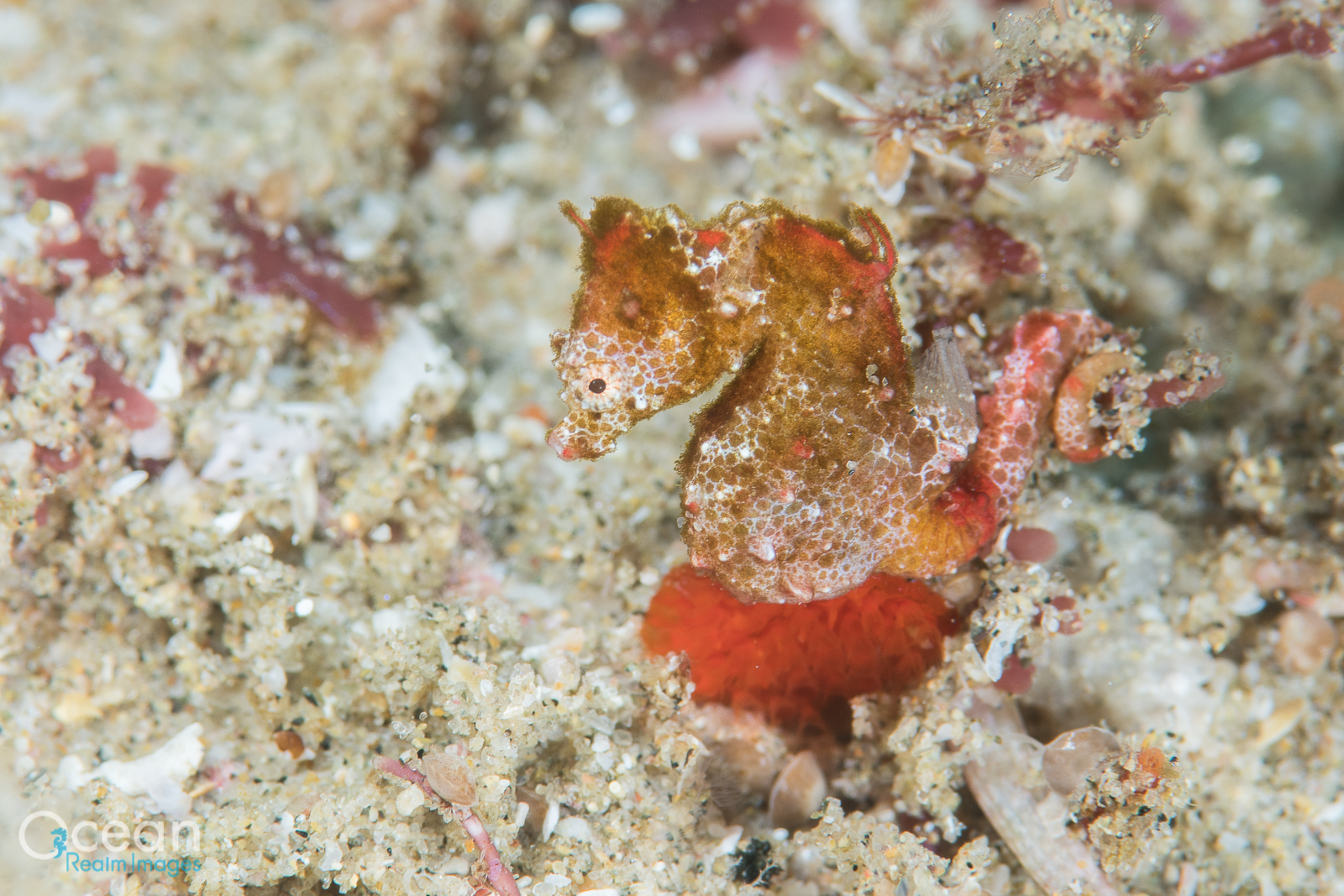
- Hippocampus nalu in situ; a paratype male, Sodwana Bay, South Africa.
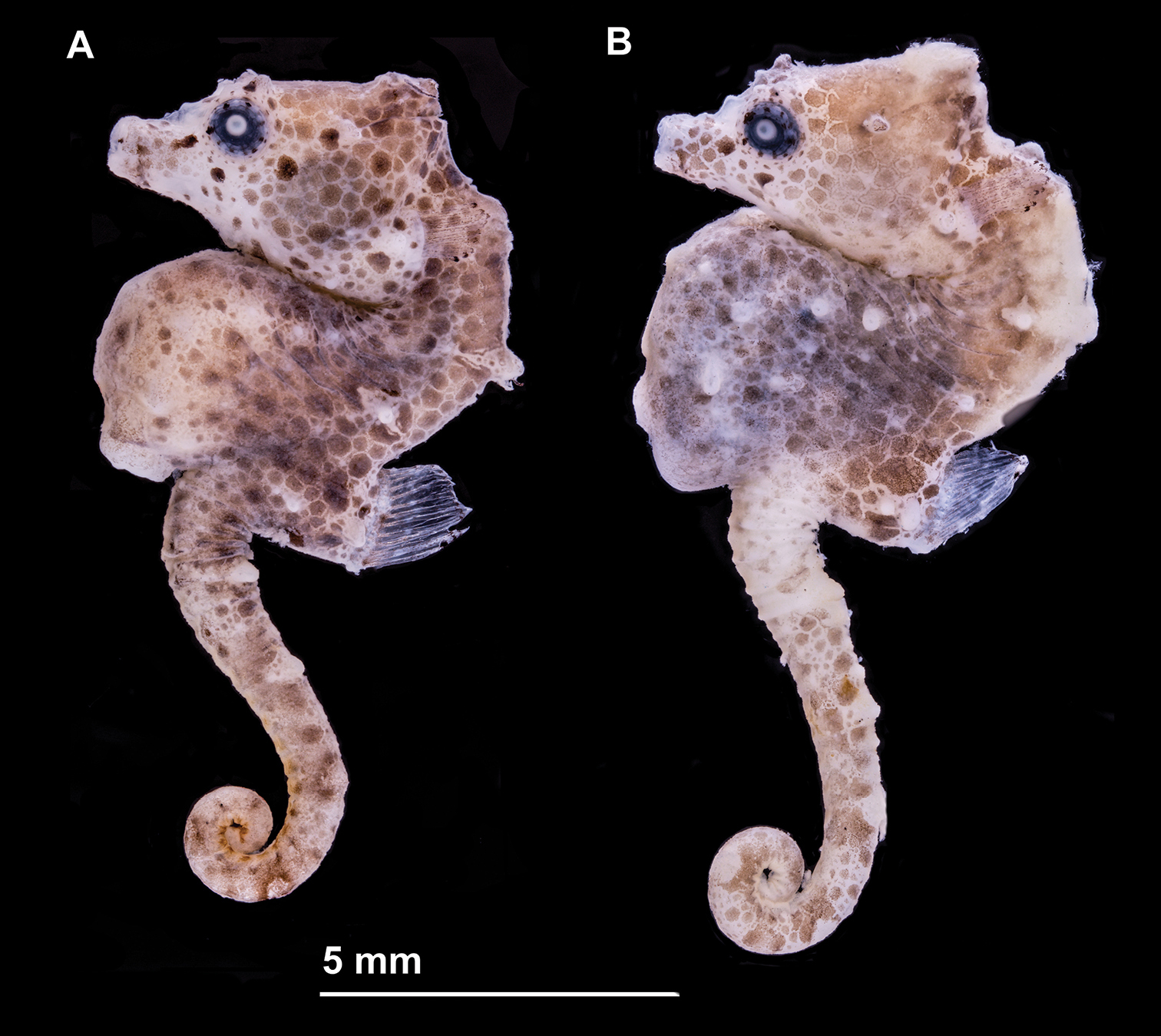

Conservation status
- CITES Appendix II

Scientific classification
- Kingdom: Animalia
- Phylum: Chordata
- Class: Actinopterygii
- Order: Syngnathiformes
- Family: Syngnathidae
- Genus: Hippocampus
- Species: H. nalu

Binomial name
- Hippocampus nalu Short, Claassens, R. Smith, De Brauwer, Hamilton, Stat and Harasti, 2020
- Sodwana pygmy seahorse (Hippocampus nalu) distribution

= Hippocampus nalu =

Species of seahorse endemic to South Africa

Hippocampus nalu, the Sodwana pygmy seahorse, African pygmy seahorse or Honeypot seahorse, is a South African species of pygmy seahorse in the family Syngnathidae.

== Discovery ==
The discovery of the species, which inhabits the waters of Sodwana Bay in South Africa, was revealed by an international team of researchers in May 2020. This small pygmy seahorse is the first known pygmy seahorse that lives in the water around Africa. When a diver from the region gave a tip to the researchers, a team of the researchers later discovered this pygmy seahorse. The team that made this discovery arrived in South Africa to look for the pygmy pipehorse and unintentionally found this new species.

== Description ==
Hippocampus nalu is quite similar to H. pontohi and H. japapigu in appearance and colouration, with adults having a honey-brown coloured skin with an overlay of white irregular reticulation and a reddish tail, and juveniles having a darker colouration. Like most syngnathids, their colouration helps them to camouflage with their surrounding habitat, as well as with algae. The Hippocampus nalu's highly different spine morphology along the superior trunk ridge also differentiates the species from its fellow pygmy seahorse. Being a pygmy seahorse, H. nalu is very small, with juveniles being ~10 mm long and adults growing up to a length of 2 centimetres.

== Habitat ==
This species is currently only known to occur in shallow coastal waters, at depths between 12 and 17 meters that contain flat sandstone-based coral reefs and short algal turfs.

== Gallery ==
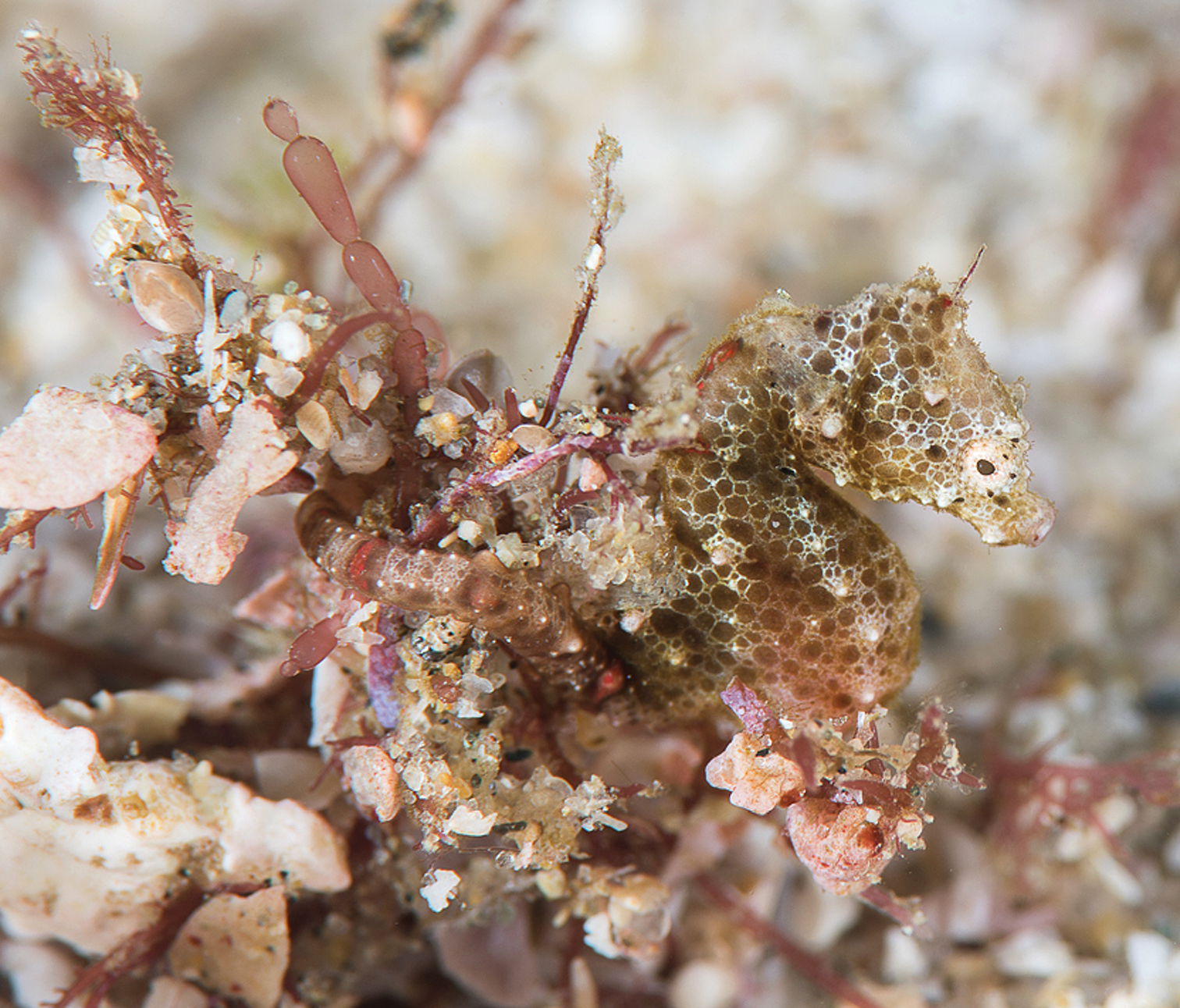
Hippocampus nalu in situ, a holotype female, Sodwana Bay, South Africa.

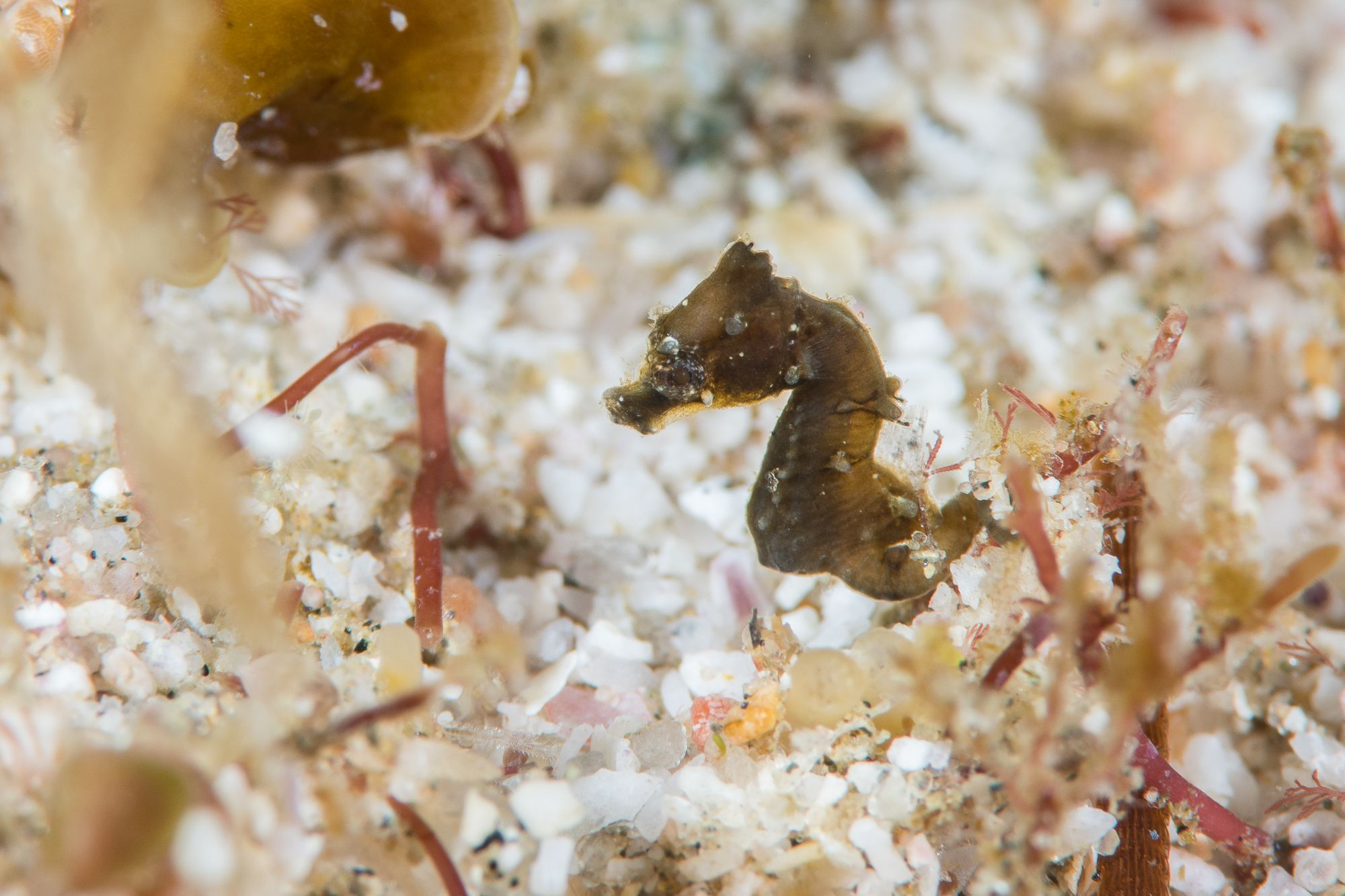
Hippocampus nalu in situ; juvenile, approximately 10 mm SL, Sodwana Bay, South Africa.
