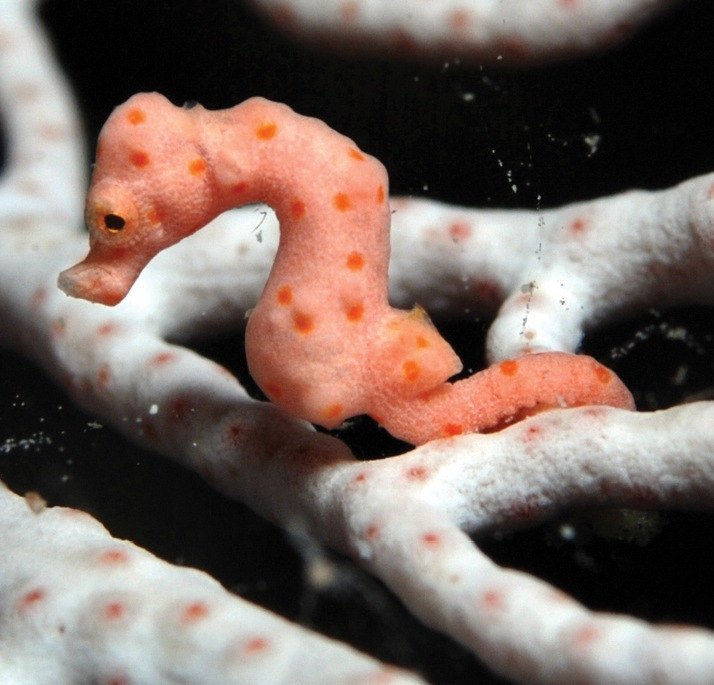

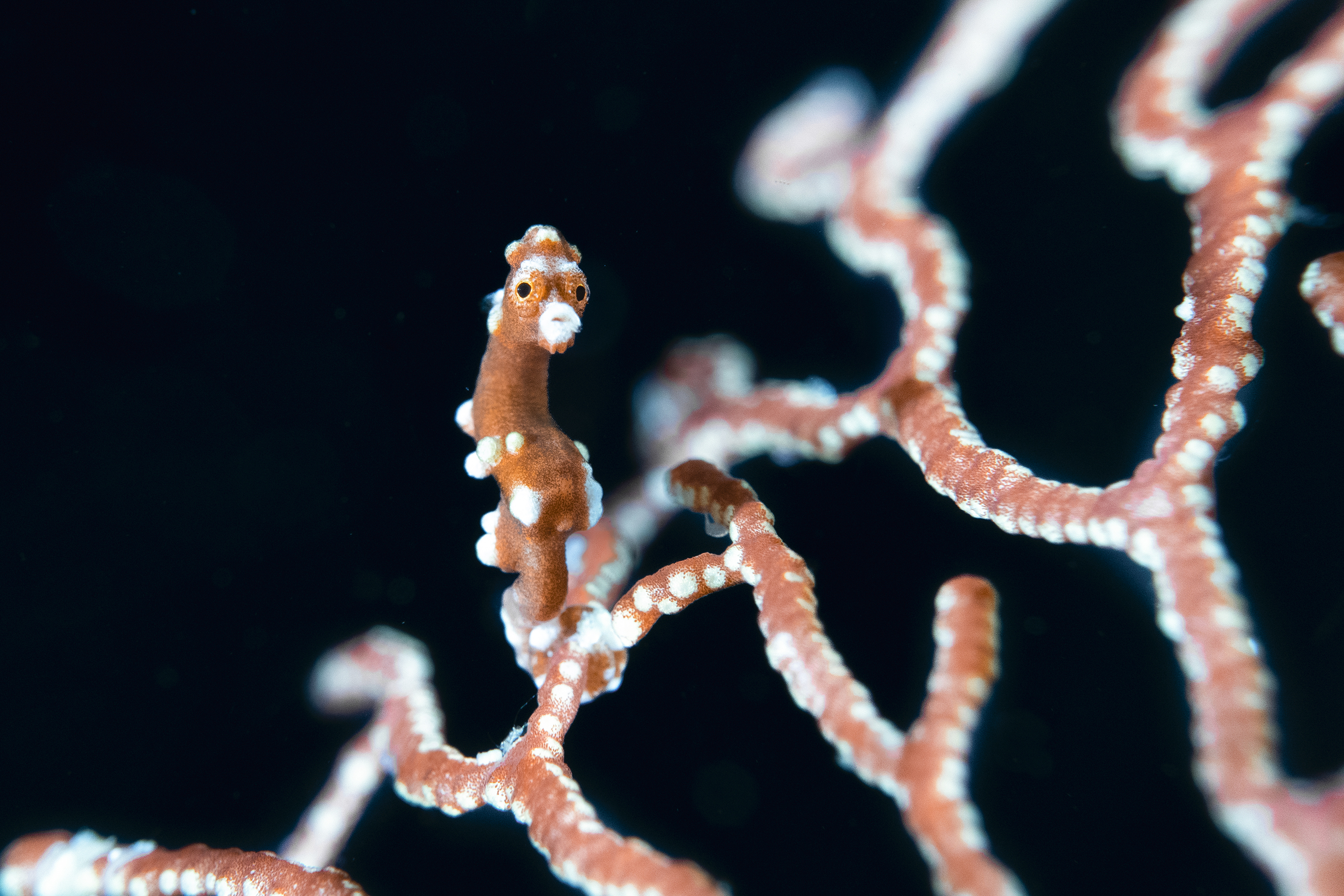
- at Raja Ampat

Conservation status
- Least Concern (IUCN 3.1)
- CITES Appendix II

Scientific classification
- Kingdom: Animalia
- Phylum: Chordata
- Class: Actinopterygii
- Order: Syngnathiformes
- Family: Syngnathidae
- Genus: Hippocampus
- Species: H. denise

Binomial name
- Hippocampus denise Lourie & Randall, 2003

= Denise's pygmy seahorse =

Species of fish

Hippocampus denise, also known as Denise's pygmy seahorse or the yellow pygmy seahorse, is a seahorse of the family Syngnathidae native to the western Pacific.

== Description ==
Denise's pygmy seahorse is a small fish which can reach a maximum length of approximately 2.4 cm, which makes it one of the smallest representatives of the seahorses. This pygmy seahorse has a short snout, slender body with a prehensile tail. Its body is either completely smooth or provided with some polyp-like tubercles, in which case these are fewer and less developed than Hippocampus bargibanti. Its coloration ranges from yellow, more or less bright, to orange with often small dark spots and sometimes darker bands on the tail.

== Distribution and habitat ==
This pygmy seahorse has been reported from several locations in the western Pacific, including Indonesia, Vanuatu, Palau, Malaysia, the Solomon Islands and Micronesia. It can be found at depths between 13 and 100 m, generally hiding in fields of gorgonians (e.g., Annella, Muricella and Echinogorgia).

== Biology ==
Denise's pygmy seahorse uses adaptive camouflage, changing its color to match that of the surrounding gorgonians. It feeds on small crustaceans and other zooplankton. An individual will stay on a single coral for the duration of its entire life. The species is ovoviviparous, and it is the male who broods the eggs in its ventral brood pouch. The latter includes villi rich in capillaries that surround each fertilized egg creating a sort of placenta supplying the embryos. When fully grown, pups are expelled from the pocket and become autonomous. Males have been recorded as giving birth to 6-7 pups after 11 days of gestation, and carrying out four sequential pregnancies of the same gestation length.

== Conservation status ==
The species is relatively rare and only few data relating to the population as well as its actual distribution exist. Because of this lack of information and the rarity of the species, Denise's pygmy seahorse is currently classified as Data Deficient by the IUCN. Internationally, it is also listed in Appendix II of the Convention on International Trade in Endangered Species of Wild Fauna and Flora (CITES) this means that it is on the list of species not necessarily threatened with extinction, but in which trade must be controlled in order to avoid utilization incompatible with its survival.

== Naming ==
The common name and the specific name honour the diver and underwater photographer Denise Tackett, who died in 2015; she was diving with Sara Lourie, one of the describers of H. denise, when she first encountered this species in the Lembeh Strait in 1999.
