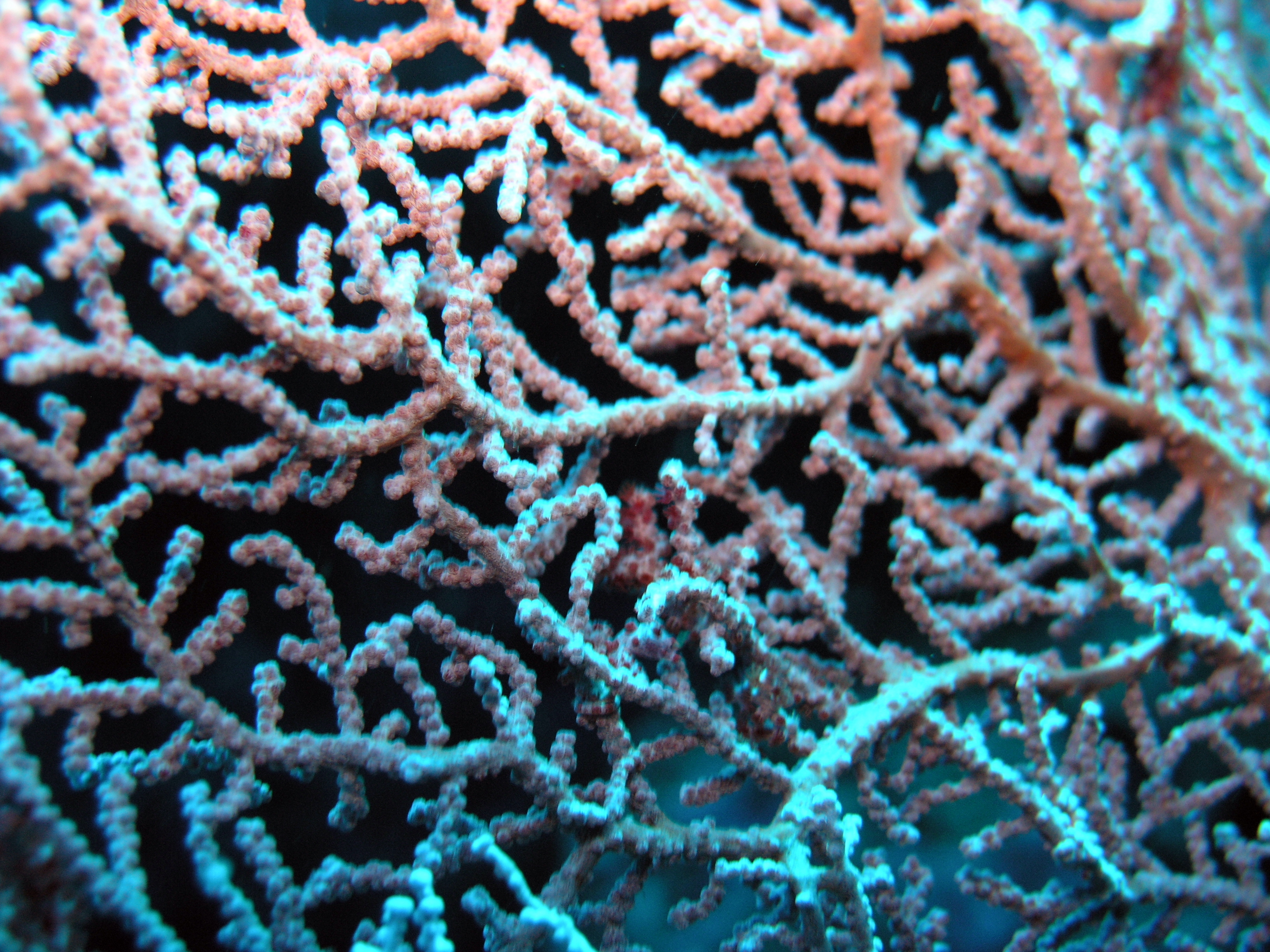
- Image of Gorgonian coral Muricella plectana with a well-camouflaged Pygmy seahorse. Hippocampus bargibanti. Taken at Lembeh Straits, North Sulawesi, Indonesia.

Scientific classification
- Kingdom: Animalia
- Phylum: Cnidaria
- Subphylum: Anthozoa
- Class: Octocorallia
- Order: Malacalcyonacea
- Family: Acanthogorgiidae

= Acanthogorgiidae =

Family of corals

Acanthogorgiidae is a family of cnidarians belonging to the order Alcyonacea.

Genera:

- Acanthogorgia Gray, 1857
- Anthogorgia Verrill, 1868
- Ascolepis
- Calcigorgia Broch, 1935
- Calicogorgia Thomson & Henderson, 1906
- Callicigorgia
- Cyclomuricea Nutting, 1908
- Muricella Verrill, 1868
- Versluysia Nutting, 1910
