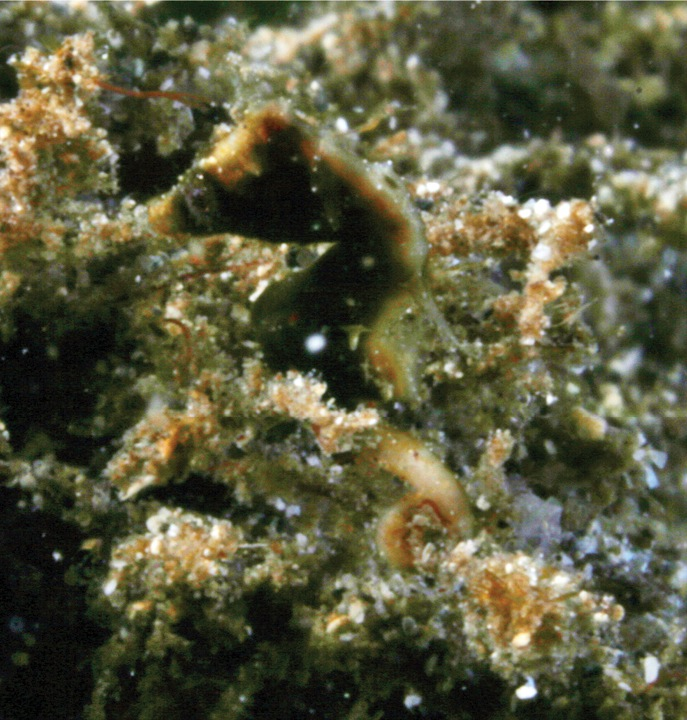

Scientific classification
- Kingdom: Animalia
- Phylum: Chordata
- Class: Actinopterygii
- Order: Syngnathiformes
- Family: Syngnathidae
- Genus: Hippocampus
- Species: H. severnsi

Binomial name
- Hippocampus severnsi Lourie & Kuiter, 2008

= Hippocampus severnsi =

Species of fish

Hippocampus severnsi (Severn's pygmy seahorse) is a synonym of Hippocampus pontohi, Lourie & Kuiter, 2008.
