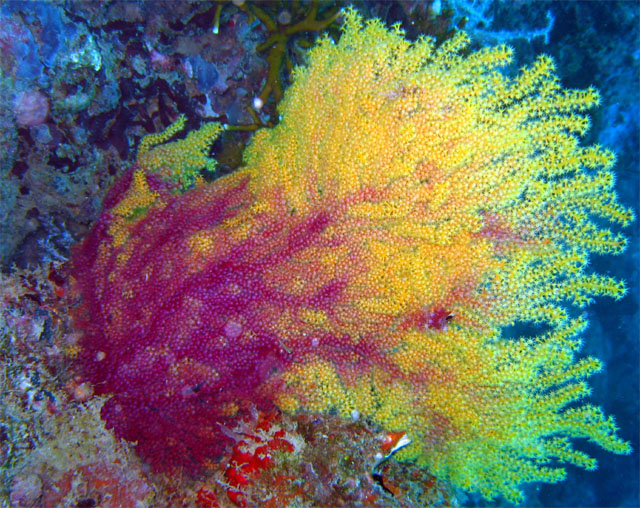
- Spiny Anthogorgia

Scientific classification
- Domain: Eukaryota
- Kingdom: Animalia
- Phylum: Cnidaria
- Class: Octocorallia
- Order: Alcyonacea
- Family: Acanthogorgiidae
- Genus: Anthogorgia; Verrill, 1868

= Anthogorgia =

Genus of corals

Anthogorgia is a genus of corals belonging to the family Acanthogorgiidae.

The species of this genus are found in Pacific and Indian Ocean.

Species:

- Anthogorgia agraricus Verrill, 1922
- Anthogorgia annectens Thomson & Dean, 1931
- Anthogorgia aurea Nutting, 1910
- Anthogorgia bocki Aurivillius, 1931
- Anthogorgia caerulea Grasshoff, 2000
- Anthogorgia divaricata (Verrill, 1865)
- Anthogorgia glomerata Thomson & Simpson, 1909
- Anthogorgia grandiflora Kükenthal, 1924
- Anthogorgia japonica Studer, 1889
- Anthogorgia ochracea Grasshoff, 1999
- Anthogorgia racemosa Thomson & Simpson, 1909
- Anthogorgia verrilli Nutting, 1910
- Anthogorgia verrilli Thomson & Henderson, 1906
