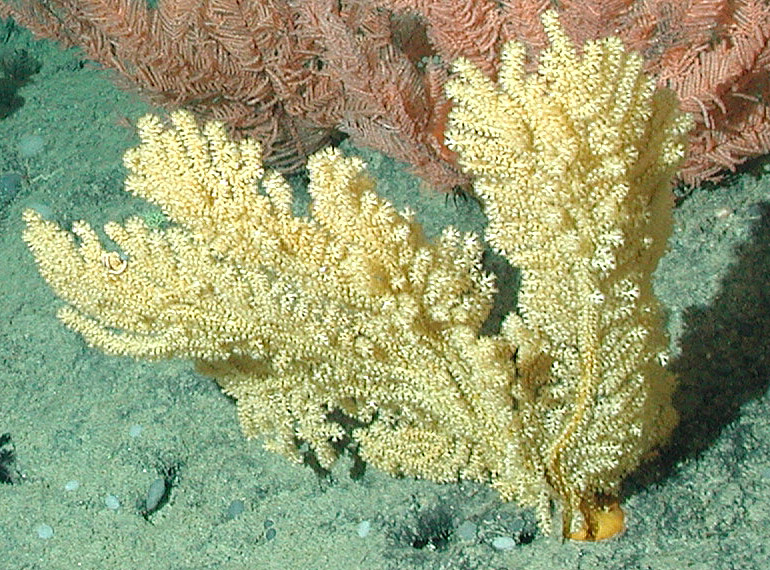

Scientific classification
- Kingdom: Animalia
- Phylum: Cnidaria
- Subphylum: Anthozoa
- Class: Octocorallia
- Order: Malacalcyonacea
- Family: Acanthogorgiidae
- Genus: Acanthogorgia; Gray, 1857

= Acanthogorgia =

Genus of corals

Acanthogorgia is a genus of gorgonian corals within the family Acanthogorgiidae, subclass Octocorallia, order Alcyonacea (now considered part of Malacalcyonacea).

The genus has cosmopolitan distribution.

== Species ==
Species:

- Acanthogorgia aldabra Bayer, 1996
- Acanthogorgia angustiflora Kükenthal & Gorzawsky, 1908
- Acanthogorgia armata Verrill, 1878
- Acanthogorgia aspera Pourtalès, 1867
- Acanthogorgia augusta Grasshoff, 1999
- Acanthogorgia boninensis Aurivillius, 1931
- Acanthogorgia breviflora Whitelegge, 1897
- Acanthogorgia brevispina Studer, 1894
- Acanthogorgia candida Kükenthal, 1908
- Acanthogorgia ceylonensis Thomson & Henderson, 1905
- Acanthogorgia densiflora Kükenthal & Gorzawsky, 1908
- Acanthogorgia dofleini Kükenthal & Gorzawsky, 1908
- Acanthogorgia flabellum Hickson, 1905
- Acanthogorgia fusca Nutting, 1912
- Acanthogorgia glyphica Grasshoff, 1999
- Acanthogorgia gotoensis Aurivillius, 1931
- Acanthogorgia gracillima Kükenthal, 1908
- Acanthogorgia grandiflora Kükenthal & Gorzawsky, 1908
- Acanthogorgia gubalensis Grasshoff, 2000
- Acanthogorgia hedlundi Aurivillius, 1931
- Acanthogorgia hirsuta Gray, 1857
- Acanthogorgia ildibaha Grasshoff, 1999
- Acanthogorgia incrustata Kükenthal, 1919
- Acanthogorgia inermis Hedlund, 1890
- Acanthogorgia irregularis Kükenthal & Gorzawsky, 1908
- Acanthogorgia isoxya Grasshoff, 1999
- Acanthogorgia japonica Kükenthal & Gorzawsky, 1908
- Acanthogorgia laxa Wright & Studer, 1889
- Acanthogorgia longiflora Wright & Studer, 1889
- Acanthogorgia media Thomson & Henderson, 1905
- Acanthogorgia meganopla Grasshoff, 1999
- Acanthogorgia multispina Kükenthal & Gorzawsky, 1908
- Acanthogorgia muricata Verrill, 1883
- Acanthogorgia paradoxa Nutting, 1912
- Acanthogorgia paramuricata Stiasny, 1947
- Acanthogorgia pararidleyi Stiasny, 1947
- Acanthogorgia pararmata Stiasny, 1947
- Acanthogorgia paraspinosa Stiasny, 1947
- Acanthogorgia paratruncata Stiasny, 1947
- Acanthogorgia pico Grasshoff, 1973
- Acanthogorgia procera Moroff, 1902
- Acanthogorgia radians Kükenthal & Gorzawsky, 1908
- Acanthogorgia ramossissima Wright & Studer, 1889
- Acanthogorgia ridleyi Wright & Studer, 1889
- Acanthogorgia schrammi Duchassaing & Michelotti, 1864
- Acanthogorgia sibogae Stiasny, 1947
- Acanthogorgia spinosa Hiles, 1899
- Acanthogorgia spissa Kükenthal, 1908
- Acanthogorgia striata Nutting, 1911
- Acanthogorgia studeri Nutting, 1911
- Acanthogorgia tenera Thomson & Russell, 1909
- Acanthogorgia thomsoni Gravier, 1913
- Acanthogorgia tori Stiasny, 1938
- Acanthogorgia turgida Nutting, 1911
- Acanthogorgia vegae Aurivillius, 1931
- Acanthogorgia wireni Aurivillius, 1931
