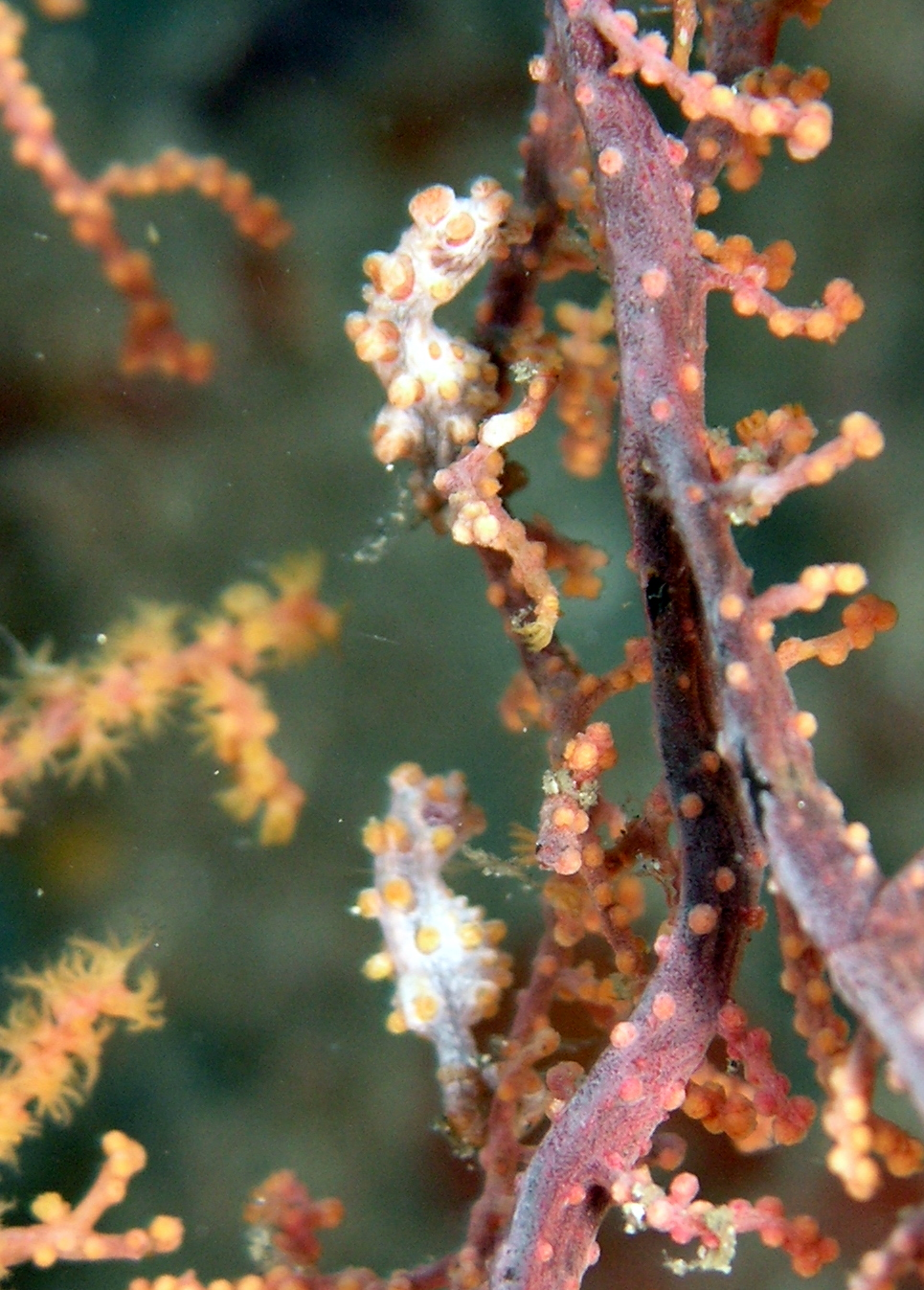

Conservation status
- Least Concern (IUCN 3.1)
- CITES Appendix II

Scientific classification
- Kingdom: Animalia
- Phylum: Chordata
- Class: Actinopterygii
- Division: Teleostei
- Order: Syngnathiformes
- Family: Syngnathidae
- Genus: Hippocampus
- Species: H. bargibanti

Binomial name
- Hippocampus bargibanti Whitley, 1970

= Hippocampus bargibanti =

Bargibant's seahorse

Species of fish

Hippocampus bargibanti, also known as Bargibant's seahorse or the pygmy seahorse, is a species of seahorse in the family Syngnathidae found in the central Indo-Pacific area.

This pygmy seahorse is tiny—usually less than 2 centimetres (0.79 in) in size—and lives exclusively on gorgonian sea-fans, as its coloration and physical features expertly mimic the coral for camouflage. The relationship between a pygmy seahorse and its host sea-fan is non-invasive and non-parasitic, serving only to shelter the diminutive seahorse. There are two known color variations, grey with red tubercles and yellow with orange tubercles. It is unknown whether or not, though speculated that, these color varieties are linked to specific host gorgonians (corals).

== Description ==
The pygmy seahorse measure less than one inch in length (2 cm), and is naturally well camouflaged and extremely difficult to see amongst the gorgonian coral it lives on. So effective is this camouflage that the species was not formally discovered by researchers until an apparent host coral was being examined in a laboratory; in 1969, a New Caledonian scientist named Georges Bargibant had been collecting specimens of Muricella gorgonians, for the Nouméa museum, when he happened to spot a pair of the tiny seahorses on the coral upon the examination table. The next year, they were officially named by Whitley as "Bargibant's pygmy seahorse". Large, bulbous tubercles (or knobs) cover its body, matching the colors and forms of the polyps of its host species of gorgonian coral, while its body matches the gorgonian stem (to which the seahorse wraps its tail around for stability). It is unknown whether individuals can change color if they alternate sea-fans—although the ability to change colour according to their surroundings does exist in some other seahorse species, such as Hippocampus whitei. Other distinctive pygmy seahorse characteristics include a fleshy head and body, a very short snout, and a long, prehensile tail. The pygmy seahorse’s coloration and tubercles closely match the Muricella gorgonian coral it inhabits, providing effective camouflage from predators.

== Evolution ==
The genome of Bargibant's seahorse was sequenced for the first time by a team of Chinese and German scientists (Qu et al.), with the results being published in PNAS in 2025. Comparing the genome to that of other fish and seahorses, the research team estimated that Bargibant's seahorse diverged from non-pygmy seahorses 18.2 million years ago, during the Early Miocene.

The scientists found that over the course of its evolutionary history, Bargibant's seahorse has completely lost 438 genes found in other seahorses, with a further 635 genes having lost so much DNA that they are no longer expressed and 5,135 genes having lost reception to certain signals. Qu et al. also found mutations they suspect are responsible for H. bargibanti's immunity to coral venom.

== Distribution ==
The pygmy seahorse is found in coastal areas ranging from southern Japan and Indonesia to northern Australia and New Caledonia on reefs and slopes at a depth of 10–40 metres (33–131 ft).

== Reproduction ==
Adults are usually found in pairs or clusters of pairs, with up to 28 pygmy seahorses recorded on a single gorgonian, and may be monogamous. As with other seahorses, the male carries the young. Breeding occurs year-round. The female lays her eggs in a brood pouch in his trunk region. They are fertilized by the male, and incubated until birth with gestation averaging two weeks. The brood pouches of male Bargibant's seahorses are unusually deep inside the body among seahorses. In one birth witnessed underwater, a male expelled a brood of 34 live young. The young or fry look like miniature adults, are independent from birth, and receive no further parental care. The fry are dark.

== Conservation ==
Very little is known about the total number of pygmy seahorses, population trends, distribution, or major threats. It has therefore been classified as Data Deficient on the International Union for Conservation of Nature's Red List. Because of the unusual and attractive colouration of this small seahorse, it is possible that it could be being collected for the aquaria trade, although no international trade in the species has been recorded. Under the care of experienced researchers at national aquaria, all pygmy seahorses and their gorgonians have died.

All seahorses (Hippocampus spp.) are listed on Appendix II of the Convention on the International Trade in Endangered Species of Wild Flora and Fauna (CITES), effective as of May 2004, limiting and regulating their international trade. Australian populations of pygmy seahorses are listed under the Australian Wildlife Protection Act, so that export permits are now required, although they are only granted for approved management plans or captive-bred animals. With such limited data available, there is an urgent need for further research to be conducted on its biology, ecology, habitat, abundance and distribution, before its status can be properly assessed and conservation measures implemented accordingly. However, the remarkably effective camouflage of this species may make such surveys particularly challenging.

== Naming ==
The specific name honours Georges Bargibant, a technician of Centre ORSTOM of Nouméa, New Caledonia.
