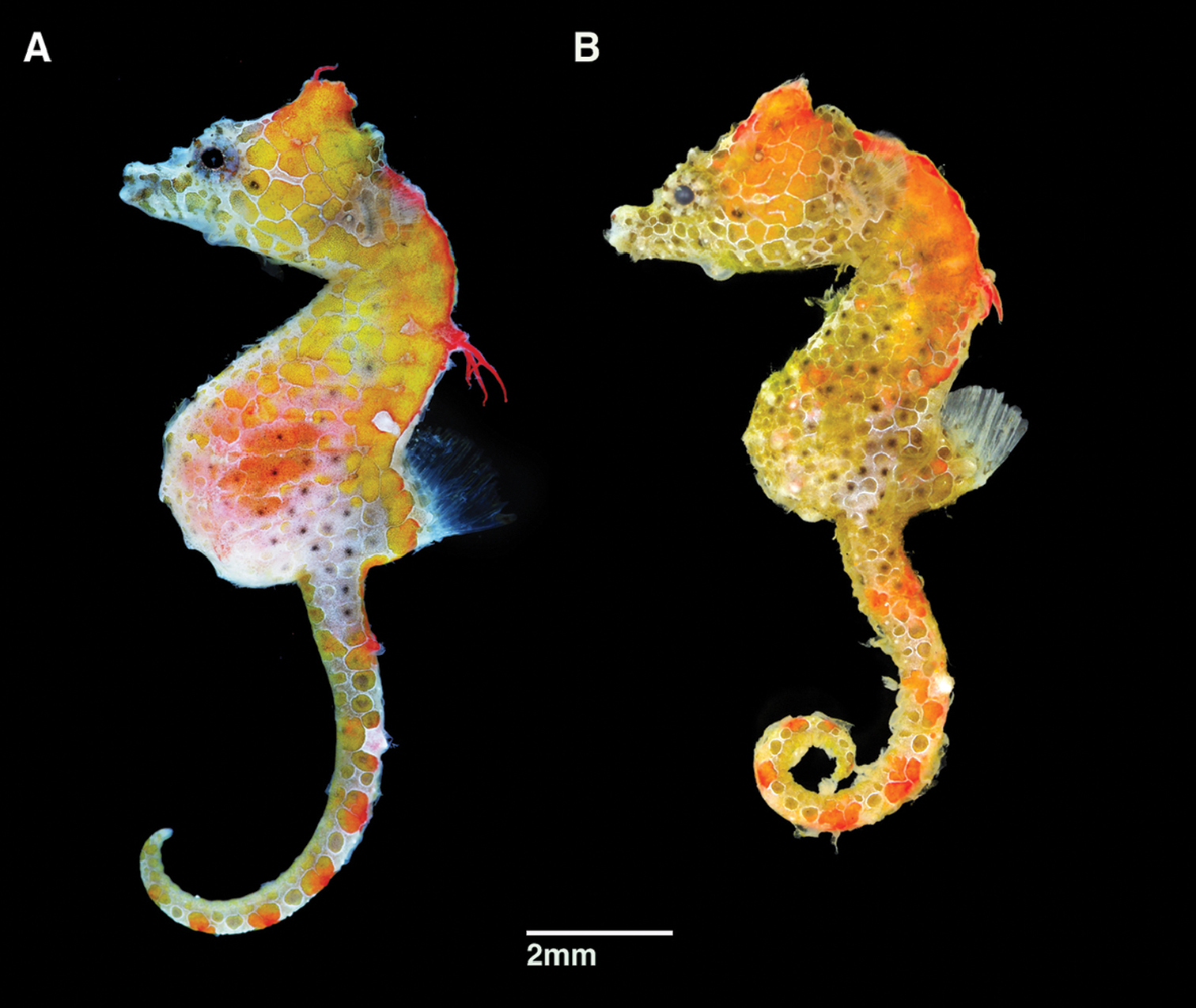
- A is the male; B is the female.

Conservation status
- CITES Appendix II

Scientific classification
- Kingdom: Animalia
- Phylum: Chordata
- Class: Actinopterygii
- Division: Teleostei
- Order: Syngnathiformes
- Family: Syngnathidae
- Genus: Hippocampus
- Species: H. japapigu

Binomial name
- Hippocampus japapigu Short, R. Smith, Motomura, Harasti & H. Hamilton, 2018

= Japanese pygmy seahorse =

Species of fish

The Japanese pygmy seahorse (Hippocampus japapigu) is a Japanese species of seahorse in the family Syngnathidae. It is also sometimes known as the Japan pig.

== Distribution and habitat ==
It lives in Northwestern Pacific near Japan, and lives at depths from 5 to 22 meters, but its usually found at 10 to 13 meters, but does not live with any specific species to host, and instead clings onto algal turfs in subtropical reefs.

As of 2018, H. japapigu is only known to be found in Japan, including Kashiwa-jima Island, Sukumo Bay; Kushimoto, Kii Peninsula; Osezaki, Izu Peninsula; the Izu Islands of Miyake and Hachijo; Sagami Bay; and Chichi-jima, Ogasawara Islands.

The type locality was collected off Imasaki, Okago, Hachijo-jima Island, Izu Islands at a depth of 10 m (33 ft).

== Description and feeding ==
It reaches a length of 1.6 cm, and contains 28 tail rings, 14 dorsal fin rays, 9 pectoral fin rays, and 4 subdorsal rings. It is the size of a jellybean, and its coloration is made for hiding in algae-covered reefs, clinging to soft corals while feeding on plankton. It has a pair of wing-like protrusions on its neck; unlike other species, it contains only one pair instead of two, and is the only seahorse in the world known to have a bony ridge running down its back.

== Reproduction ==
The broad pouch of the pygmy seahorse is present within the body cavity and located on the trunk, in contrast to tail-brooding non-pygmy seahorses.

== Taxonomic history ==
In 2013, after completing his PhD on the biology of the Bargibant's and Denise's pygmy seahorses, Richard Smith went to a fish biology conference in Okinawa in 2013, after which he photographed the Japanese pygmy seahorse on several dives off of Hachijo-jima, one of the Izu Islands about 180 miles from Tokyo. There he found about a dozen specimens.

The species description was published by Short and colleagues in a 2018 issue of ZooKeys; it was based on one female holotype, a male and a female paratype, and two photographs of additional specimens. The holotype and one paratype were deposited at the Burke Museum at the University of Washington; the other paratype was deposited at the Kagoshima University Museum.

Short and colleagues proposed Japanese pygmy seahorse as the English and Japanese common names for the species. The specific epithet comes from its colloquial Japanese name: Japan Pig or Japapigu.
