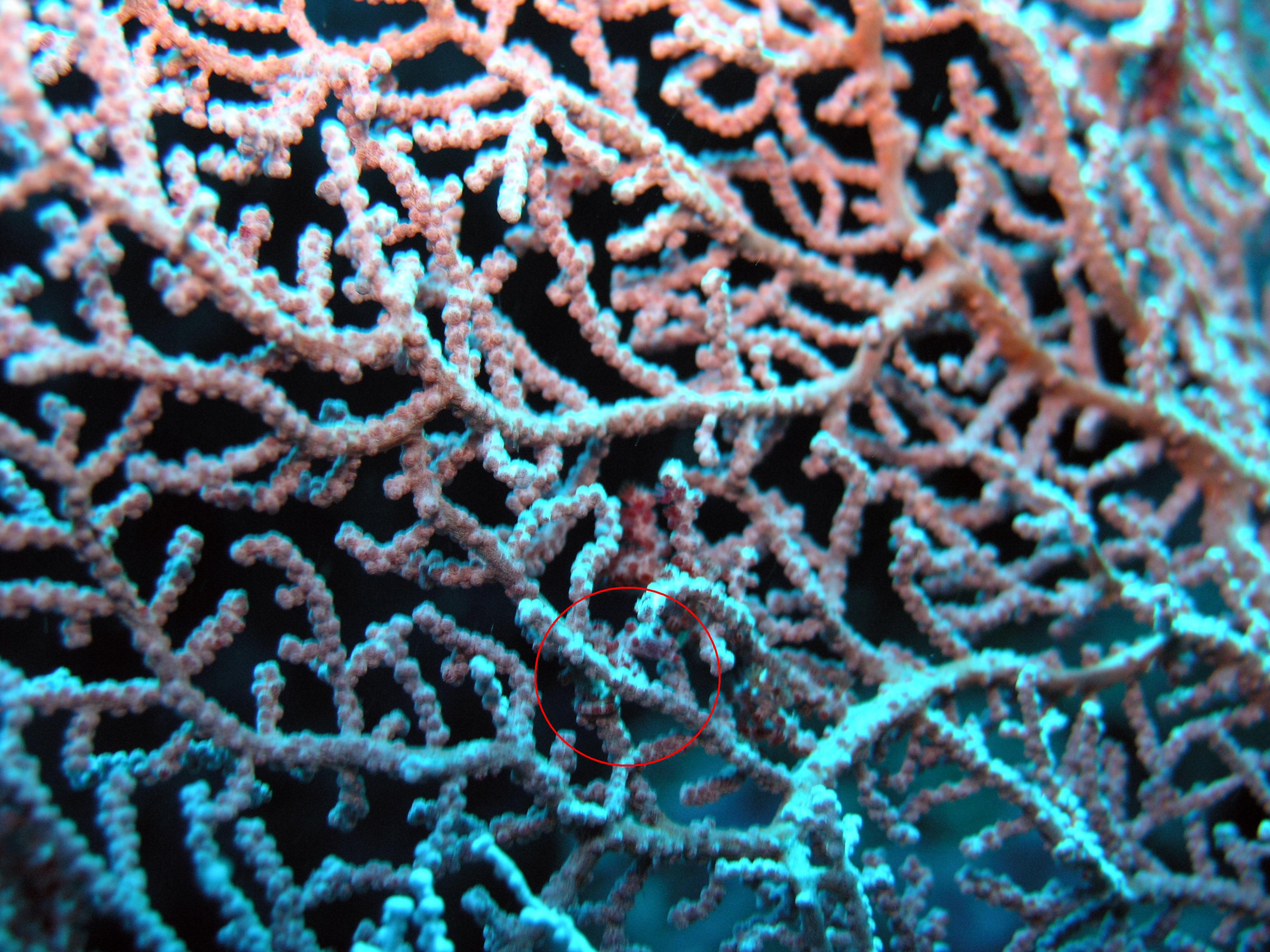
- Hippocampus bargibanti2ID

Scientific classification
- Kingdom: Animalia
- Phylum: Cnidaria
- Subphylum: Anthozoa
- Class: Octocorallia
- Order: Malacalcyonacea
- Family: Acanthogorgiidae
- Genus: Muricella; Verrill, 1868

= Muricella =

Genus of corals

Muricella is a genus of corals belonging to the family Acanthogorgiidae.

The species of this genus are found in Pacific and Indian Ocean, Caribbean.

== Species ==
Species:

- Muricella abnormalis Nutting, 1912
- Muricella argentea (Nutting, 1910)
- Muricella aruensis Kükenthal, 1919
- Muricella brunnea Kükenthal, 1924
- Muricella crassa Wright & Studer, 1889
- Muricella decipiens Kükenthal, 1924
- Muricella dentata (Nutting, 1910)
- Muricella englemani Bayer, 1949
- Muricella exilis Tixier-Durivault, 1972
- Muricella flexilis Hiles, 1899
- Muricella flexuosa (Verrill, 1865)
- Muricella gracilis Wright & Studer, 1889
- Muricella magna Utinomi, 1961
- Muricella megaspina Hargitt in Hargitt & Rogers, 1901
- Muricella nitida (Verrill, 1868)
- Muricella operculata (Nutting, 1910)
- Muricella paraglectaba Grasshoff, 1999
- Muricella perramosa Ridley, 1882
- Muricella plectana Grasshoff, 1999
- Muricella ramosa Thomson & Henderson, 1905
- Muricella reticulata (Nutting, 1910)
- Muricella rosea (Nutting, 1910)
- Muricella sayad Grasshoff, 2000
- Muricella stellata (Nutting, 1910)
- Muricella tenera Ridley, 1884
- Muricella vasseuri Tixier-Durivault, 1972
