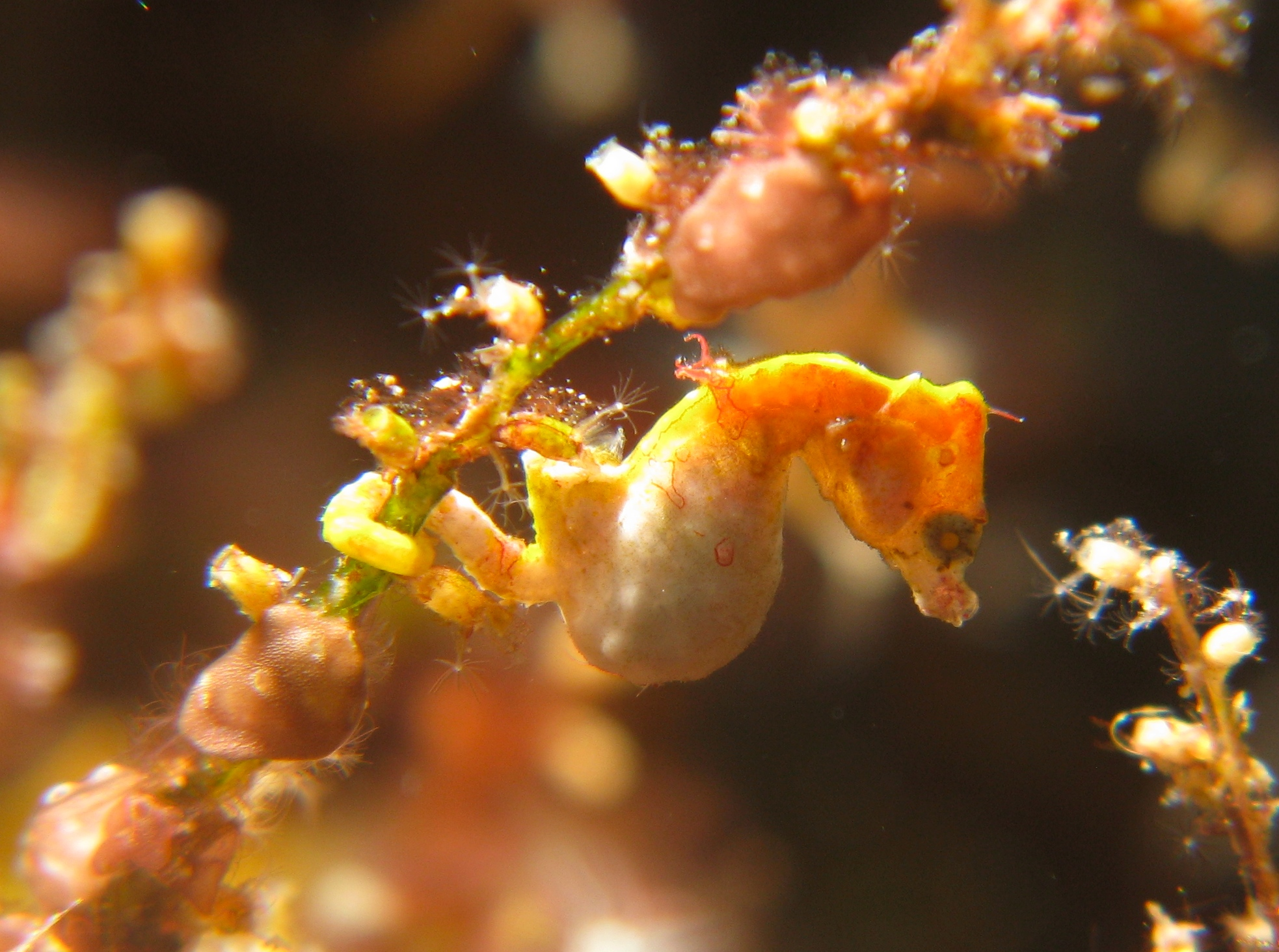

Conservation status
- Least Concern (IUCN 3.1)
- CITES Appendix II

Scientific classification
- Kingdom: Animalia
- Phylum: Chordata
- Class: Actinopterygii
- Order: Syngnathiformes
- Family: Syngnathidae
- Genus: Hippocampus
- Species: H. pontohi

Binomial name
- Hippocampus pontohi Lourie & Kuiter, 2008

Synonyms
- Hippocampus severnsi Lourie & Kuiter, 2008

= Hippocampus pontohi =

Species of fish

Hippocampus pontohi, also known as Pontoh's pygmy seahorse or the weedy pygmy seahorse, is a seahorse of the family Syngnathidae native to the central Indo-pacific. Named after Hentje Pontoh, the Indonesian dive guide from Bunaken (Manado) who first brought these pygmy seahorses to attention.

== Description ==
The weedy pygmy seahorse is a small fish which can reach a maximum length of approximately 1.7 cm, which makes it one of the smallest representatives of the seahorses. The body is small and slender with a prehensile tail. The head is relatively large, it represents about 25% of the size of the body. The eyes are prominent. It has a moderately long snout and this later does not have any bulbous tip. The coronet rises rearwardly creating a kind of angle when the animal's profile is observed. The trunk and tail may also have some small bulbs. The coronet and the widest part of the back can have some red distinctive branching filaments. The body background color is whitish with a yellow to pinkish color on the head and backside of its body. Thin red lines may also extend from the starting point of the cutaneous filaments from its back. The tail has also some red bands.

== Distribution and habitat ==
The Pontoh's pygmy seahorse has been recorded from central Indo-Pacific area in eastern Indonesia and Papua New Guinea.

This pygmy seahorse likes reef wall exposed to current and rich in Halimeda plants or hydroids Aglaophenia cupressina between 11 and 25 meters depth.

== Biology ==
The weedy pygmy seahorse has a carnivorous diet and feeds on small crustaceans and other planktonic organisms. The species is ovoviviparous, and it is the male who broods the eggs in its ventral brood pouch. The latter includes villi rich in capillaries that surround each fertilized egg creating a sort of placenta supplying the embryos. When fully grown, pups are expelled from the pocket and become autonomous.

== Conservation status ==
This species population may be vulnerable to the loss of meadows of Halimedadue to the acidification of oceans, however, it can use other habitats and is listed as Least Concern by the IUCN.

Internationally, it is also listed in Appendix II of the Convention on International Trade in Endangered Species of Wild Fauna and Flora (CITES) this means that it is on the list of species not necessarily threatened with extinction, but in which trade must be controlled in order to avoid utilization incompatible with their survival.

== Naming ==
The specific name honours Hence Pontoh, an Indonesian dive guide who brought these small seahorses to the attention of its describers.
